= List of settlements in the Florina regional unit =

This is a list of settlements in the Florina regional unit, Greece.

- Achlada
- Aetos
- Agia Paraskevi
- Agios Achilleios
- Agios Germanos
- Agios Panteleimonas
- Agios Vartholomaios
- Agrapidies
- Akritas
- Alona
- Ammochori
- Amyntaio
- Anargyroi
- Ano Kalliniki
- Ano Kleines
- Ano Ydroussa
- Antartiko
- Antigonos
- Armenochori
- Asprogeia
- Atrapos
- Drosopigi
- Ethniko
- Fanos
- Farangi
- Filotas
- Flampouro
- Florina
- Itea
- Kallithea
- Karyes
- Kato Kalliniki
- Kella
- Kladorrachi
- Kleidi
- Kolchiki
- Koryfi
- Kotas
- Kratero
- Krystallopigi
- Laimos
- Lechovo
- Lefkonas
- Leptokaryes
- Levaia
- Limnochori
- Lofoi
- Maniaki
- Marina
- Meliti
- Mesochori
- Mesokampos
- Mesonisi
- Mikrolimni
- Neochoraki
- Neos Kafkasos
- Niki
- Nymfaio
- Palaistra
- Pappagiannis
- Paroreio
- Pedino
- Pelargos
- Petres
- Pisoderi
- Platy
- Polyplatano
- Polypotamo
- Prasino
- Proti
- Psarades
- Rodonas
- Sitaria
- Sklithro
- Skopia
- Skopos
- Triantafyllia
- Tripotamos
- Trivouno
- Valtonera
- Variko
- Vatochori
- Vegora
- Vevi
- Vrontero
- Xino Nero
- Ydroussa

== See also ==
- List of towns and villages in Greece
