= Paroreio =

Village in Western Macedonia, Greece

Paroreio Παρόρειο
- Community

- Location within Greece
- Coordinates: 40°52′N 21°22′E
- Country: Greece
- Administrative region: West Macedonia
- Regional unit: Florina
- Municipality: Florina
- Municipal unit: Kato Kleines

Population (2021)
  - Community: 12
- Time zone: UTC+2 (EET)
  - Summer (DST): UTC+3 (EEST)

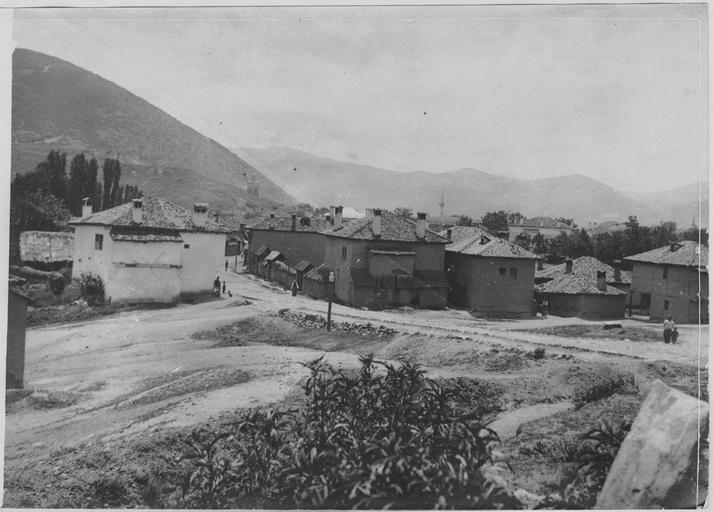
Antante in Bitusha, today Parorio, in 1917

Paroreio (pronounced Parori by locals) (Greek: Παρόρειο, before 1926: Μπιτούσα – Bitousa; Bulgarian: Битуша, Macedonian: Битуша, Bituša/Bitusha) is a small village located about 15 kilometres (9.3 mi) north of Florina, the capital of the regional unit of Florina in northwestern Greece. It is on the ridge of Baba Mountain on the periphery of the Pelagonia plain. Today, Paroreio is inhabited by only a small number of full-time residents. At its peak in the 1930s, the village reached about 600-700 inhabitants, mostly families looking for a piece of fertile land to cultivate and farm in the nearby valley. The residents were employed in agriculture, raising livestock, timber getting and other trades and necessary occupations.

== History ==
Little of history was known between the Medieval and the Balkan Wars but during that time it was called Bitusha (Битуша, Bitousa in Greek). It was annexed to Greece in 1913 and many inhabitants moved northeast, some to Eastern Thrace and Asia Minor. In 1926 the Greek government renamed the village to Parori, and in 1940 to Paroreion. in an effort to Hellenize Macedonia.

The region saw a military presence during World War I and World War II, with French and other ally troops establishing small bases in the area. Border towns like Parorio were at risk of invading parties from the Balkans to the North, who were looking for any point of entry into Greece and access to its important sea routes. The area also saw a brutal conflict when the Greek Civil War emerged following World War II. Many were forced out of their homes and much hardship and tragedy took place at this time.

Only a small fraction of the former population numbering 800 continues to inhabit the village. Pre–war and post–war immigration from Paroreio led to the formation of a diaspora split between communities in Toronto, Canada and Victoria, Australia, in particular the cities of Melbourne and Shepperton.

Today, the area is sparsely inhabited, but is experiencing a slight rejuvenation in the agriculture industry, as part of a plan funded by the European Union. Some of Greece's most fertile land lies in the area that surrounds the region.

== Demographics ==
Historical population
Year	Pop.	±%
1991	70	—
2001	40	−42.9%
2011	23	−42.5%
2021	12	−47.8%

== See also ==
- Paroria (disambiguation)
- List of settlements in the Florina regional unit
