= Limnochori =

Limnochori may refer to the following places in Greece:

- Limnochori, Achaea, a village in Achaea
- Limnochori, Florina, a village in the Florina regional unit, part of the municipal unit Aetos
- Limnochori, Serres, a village in the Serres regional unit, part of the municipality Irakleia
