= Atrapos =

- Community
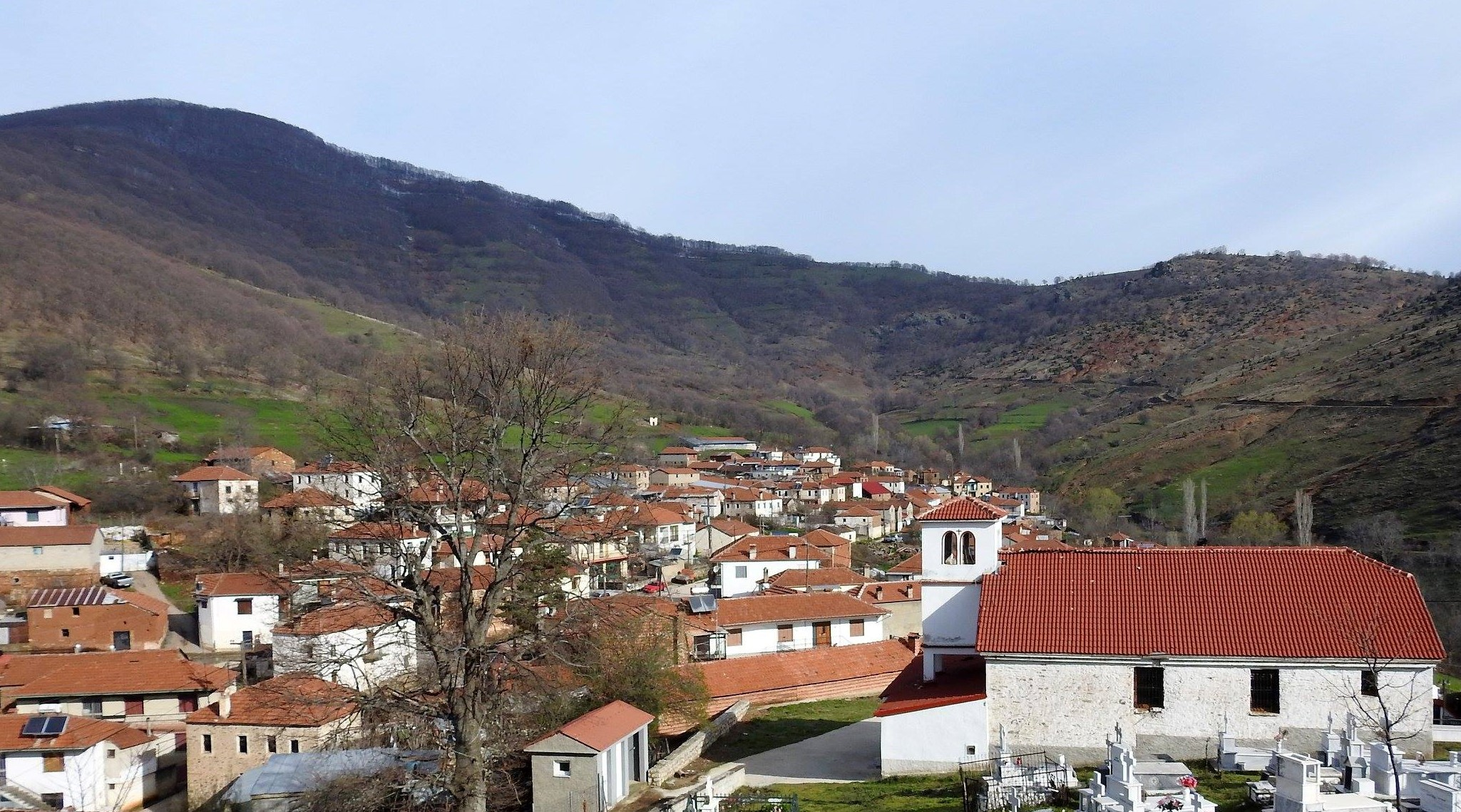

- Location within Greece
- Coordinates: 40°43′27″N 21°24′20″E
- Country: Greece
- Geographic region: Macedonia
- Administrative region: Western Macedonia
- Regional unit: Florina
- Municipality: Florina
- Municipal unit: Perasma

Population (2021)
  - Community: 121
- Time zone: UTC+2 (EET)
  - Summer (DST): UTC+3 (EEST)

Atrapos (Greek: Ατραπός, before 1926: Κραπέστινα – Krapestina) is a village in Florina Regional Unit, Macedonia, Greece.

In data collected by Greek authorities, in 1911, Krapestina had 400 inhabitants composed of 225 "Bulgarians" and 175 "Greeks", all "Bulgarian speaking". In 1935, authorities stated the village had 92 families, with 66 families having Slavic "morale" (fronima) and 26 families being "foreign speakers" with Greek "morale".

A letter (1935) by Lieutenant Stefos Grigoriou wrote the village was populated by "Bulgarians" and only the priest's family had Greek consciousness with their Greekness described as being "Grade C". In August 1959, villagers partook in a large patriotic language oath ceremony at the local school yard where in the presence of Greek authorities they swore to cease using their Slavic language and to speak only Greek. After the language oath ceremony, villagers continued to use their language and memories of the event lingered in the 1990s.

Atrapos had 160 inhabitants in 1981. In fieldwork done by anthropologist Riki Van Boeschoten in late 1993, Atrapos was populated by Slavophones. The Macedonian language was used by people of all ages, both in public and private settings, and as the main language for interpersonal relationships. Some elderly villagers had little knowledge of Greek.

In fieldwork done by anthropologist Anastasia Karakasidou in 1996, elderly people spoke the local dialect of the Macedonian language and there were a few women who had no knowledge of Greek. The village children spoke Greek among themselves.
