= Maniaki =

Maniaki (Greek: Μανιάκι) may refer to several places in Greece:

- Maniaki, Florina, a village in Florina
- Maniakoi, a town in Kastoria
- Maniaki, Messenia, a village in Messenia
  - Battle of Maniaki, fought 1825 between Egyptian and Greek forces
