= Kolchiki =

Village in Macedonia, Greece

Kolchiki Κολχική
- Community
- Location within Greece
- Coordinates: 40°44′20″N 21°29′1″E
- Country: Greece
- Geographic region: Macedonia
- Administrative region: Western Macedonia
- Regional unit: Florina
- Municipality: Florina
- Municipal unit: Perasma

Population (2021)
  - Community: 175
- Time zone: UTC+2 (EET)
  - Summer (DST): UTC+3 (EEST)

Kolchiki (Greek: Κολχική, before 1928: Πλησεβίτσα – Plisevitsa) is a village in the Florina regional unit of Macedonia, Greece.

According to the statistics of Vasil Kanchov, 700 Muslim Albanians lived in the village in 1900.

The 1920 Greek census recorded 563 people in the village, and 563 inhabitants (103 families) were Muslim in 1923. Following the Greek–Turkish population exchange, Greek refugee families in Plisevitsa were from the Caucasus (92) in 1926. The 1928 Greek census recorded 352 village inhabitants. In 1928, the refugee families numbered 95 (367 people).

Kolchiki had 315 inhabitants in 1981. In fieldwork done by anthropologist Riki Van Boeschoten in late 1993, Kolchiki was populated by a Greek population descended from Asia Minor Greek refugees who arrived during the population exchange. Pontic Greek was spoken in the village by people over 30 in public and private settings. Children understood the language, but mostly did not use it.
