= Anargyroi, Florina =

Anargyroi Ανάργυροι
- Community
- Location within Greece
- Coordinates: 40°36′9″N 21°36′42″E
- Country: Greece
- Geographic region: Macedonia
- Administrative region: Western Macedonia
- Regional unit: Florina
- Municipality: Amyntaio
- Municipal unit: Aetos

Population (2021)
  - Community: 357
- Time zone: UTC+2 (EET)
  - Summer (DST): UTC+3 (EEST)

Anargyroi (Greek: Ανάργυροι, before 1928: Ρούδνικ – Roudnik) is a village in Florina Regional Unit, Macedonia, Greece.

The 1920 Greek census recorded 133 people in the village, and 23 inhabitants (6 families) were Muslim in 1923. Following the Greek–Turkish population exchange, Greek refugee families in Roudnik were from Pontus (1) and the Caucasus (36) in 1926. The 1928 Greek census recorded 341 village inhabitants. In 1928, the refugee families numbered 60 (214 people).
