= Kato Kalliniki =

- Community
- Location within Greece
- Coordinates: 40°51′53″N 21°27′59″E
- Country: Greece
- Geographic region: Macedonia
- Administrative region: Western Macedonia
- Regional unit: Florina
- Municipality: Florina
- Municipal unit: Kato Kleines

Population (2021)
  - Community: 54
- Time zone: UTC+2 (EET)
  - Summer (DST): UTC+3 (EEST)

Kato Kalliniki (Greek: Κάτω Καλλινίκη, before 1926: Κάτω Κάλενικ – Kato Kalenik) is a village in Florina Regional Unit, Macedonia, Greece.

Kato Kalliniki had 125 inhabitants in 1981. In fieldwork done by anthropologist Riki Van Boeschoten in late 1993, Kato Kalliniki was populated by a Greek population descended from Anatolian Greek refugees who arrived during the Greek–Turkish population exchange, and Slavophones. The Macedonian language was spoken in the village by people over 30 in public and private settings. Children understood the language, but mostly did not use it. Pontic Greek was spoken in the village by people over 30 in public and private settings. Children understood the language, but mostly did not use it.
