= Ano Kalliniki =

- Community
- Location within Greece
- Coordinates: 40°51′37″N 21°27′9″E
- Country: Greece
- Geographic region: Macedonia
- Administrative region: Western Macedonia
- Regional unit: Florina
- Municipality: Florina
- Municipal unit: Kato Kleines

Population (2021)
  - Community: 247
- Time zone: UTC+2 (EET)
  - Summer (DST): UTC+3 (EEST)

Ano Kalliniki (Greek: Άνω Καλλινίκη, before 1926: Άνω Κάλενικ – Ano Kalenik) is a village in Florina Regional Unit, Macedonia, Greece.

Ano Kalliniki had 333 inhabitants in 1981. In fieldwork done by anthropologist Riki Van Boeschoten in late 1993, Ano Kalliniki was populated by Slavophones. The Macedonian language was used by people of all ages, both in public and private settings, and as the main language for interpersonal relationships. Some elderly villagers had little knowledge of Greek.
