= Prasino =

Prasino (Greek: Πράσινο meaning "green") may refer to several places in Greece:

- Prasino, Arcadia, a town in Arcadia
- Prasino, Boeotia, a village in Boeotia
- Prasino, Elis, a village in Elis
- Prasino, Florina, a village in Florina Regional Unit
