= Agia Paraskevi, Florina =

Agia Paraskevi Αγία Παρασκευή
- Community
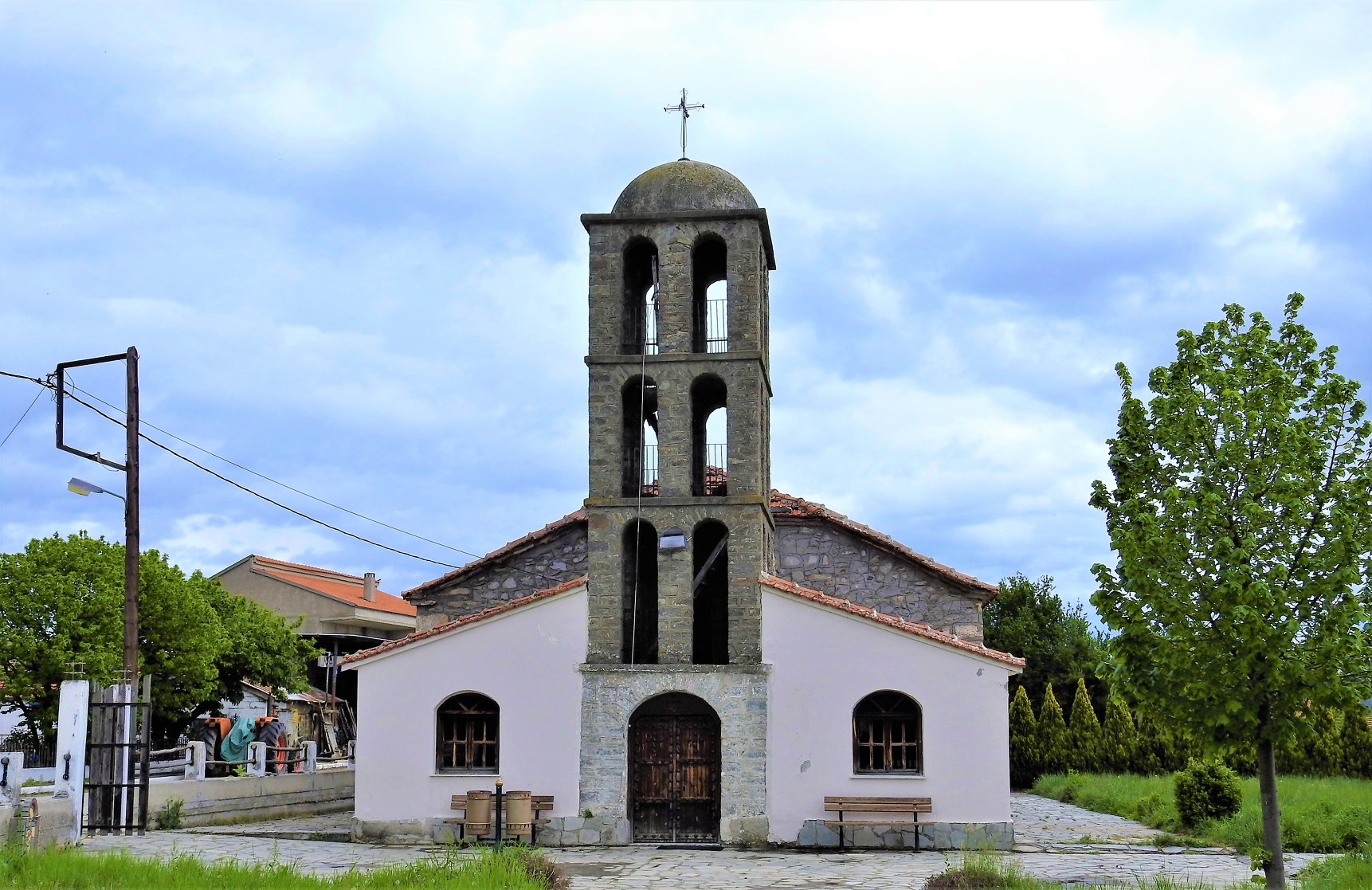
- St. Nicholas Orthodox Church, Agia Paraskevi

- Location within Greece
- Coordinates: 40°52′45″N 21°22′45″E
- Country: Greece
- Administrative region: Western Macedonia
- Regional unit: Florina
- Municipality: Florina
- Municipal unit: Kato Kleines

Population (2021)
  - Community: 109
- Time zone: UTC+2 (EET)
  - Summer (DST): UTC+3 (EEST)

Agia Paraskevi (Greek: Αγία Παρασκευή, also: Σφέτκα Πέτκα – Sfetka Petka; Bulgarian and Macedonian: Света Петка, Sveta Petka) is a village in the Florina regional unit, Western Macedonia, Greece. The village is a flat agricultural village at an elevation of 612 metres (2,008 ft). Agia Paraskevi is neighboured by Dragoš (North Macedonia), Ethnikon, Parori, Kato Kleines, Polyplatanos and Niki.

The church of St. Paraskevi is located in the village. The modern Greek name of the village is derived from the church.

The village was recorded in an Ottoman document from the 15th century. In statistics gathered by Vasil Kanchov in 1900, Sveta Petka was populated by 550 Christian Bulgarians. The population was 550 in 1912. Land expropriations and resettlement of Greek refugees in the area by the Greek government made several villagers in 1925 petition the Yugoslav consul in Thessaloniki for recognition as "Serbs" to safeguard their rights. In the Second World War, Yugoslav partisans highlighted Slavic Macedonian issues about rights among villagers and recruited komitadjis in Agia Paraskevi for a new armed unit called the Macedonian Regiment of Kastoria and Florina.

Agia Paraskevi had 231 inhabitants in 1981. In fieldwork done by anthropologist Riki Van Boeschoten in late 1993, Agia Paraskevi was populated by Slavophones. The Macedonian language was spoken by people over 60, mainly in private.

Villagers from Agia Paraskevi reside in Melbourne, Australia. The diaspora calls its community association "Saint Pat" for official uses instead of favouring either the Greek or Macedonian form of the village name to maintain communal cohesion and keep politics out. The variety of the Macedonian language spoken by post World War Two immigrants from Agia Paraskevi in Australia is a sub–dialect of the wider Macedonian dialect spoken in the Florina area.
