= Pelargos, Florina =

Pelargos Πελαργός
- Community
- Location within Greece
- Coordinates: 40°36′55″N 21°45′19″E
- Country: Greece
- Geographic region: Macedonia
- Administrative region: Western Macedonia
- Regional unit: Florina
- Municipality: Amyntaio
- Municipal unit: Filotas

Population (2021)
  - Community: 227
- Time zone: UTC+2 (EET)
  - Summer (DST): UTC+3 (EEST)

Pelargos (Greek: Πελαργός, before 1927: Μουραλάρ – Mouralar) is a village in Florina Regional Unit, Macedonia, Greece.

The 1920 Greek census recorded 510 people in the village, and 510 inhabitants were Muslim in 1923. Following the Greek–Turkish population exchange, Greek refugee families in Mouralar were from Pontus (86) and the Caucasus (4) in 1926. The 1928 Greek census recorded 374 village inhabitants. In 1928, the refugee families numbered 93 (345 people).
