= Leptokaryes =

Leptokaryes Λεπτοκαρυές
- Community
- Location within Greece
- Coordinates: 40°44′47″N 21°30′33″E
- Country: Greece
- Geographic region: Macedonia
- Administrative region: Western Macedonia
- Regional unit: Florina
- Municipality: Florina
- Municipal unit: Perasma

Population (2021)
  - Community: 51
- Time zone: UTC+2 (EET)
  - Summer (DST): UTC+3 (EEST)

Leptokaryes (Greek: Λεπτοκαρυές, before 1926: Λεσκοβίτσα – Leskovitsa) is a village in Florina Regional Unit, Macedonia, Greece.

Leptokaryes had 162 inhabitants in 1981. In fieldwork done by anthropologist Riki Van Boeschoten in late 1993, Leptokaryes was populated by Slavophones. The Macedonian language was used by people of all ages, both in public and private settings, and as the main language for interpersonal relationships. Some elderly villagers had little knowledge of Greek.
