= Proti =

Proti may refer to:

- Proti, Serres, Greece, a city
- Proti, Florina, Greece, a village
- Proti Island, Greece, in the Ionian Sea
- Proti, the Greek name of Kınalıada island in Turkey, in the Sea of Marmara

== See also ==
- Giampietro de Proti (1345–1412), Italian politician and military leader
