= Ammochori =

- Community
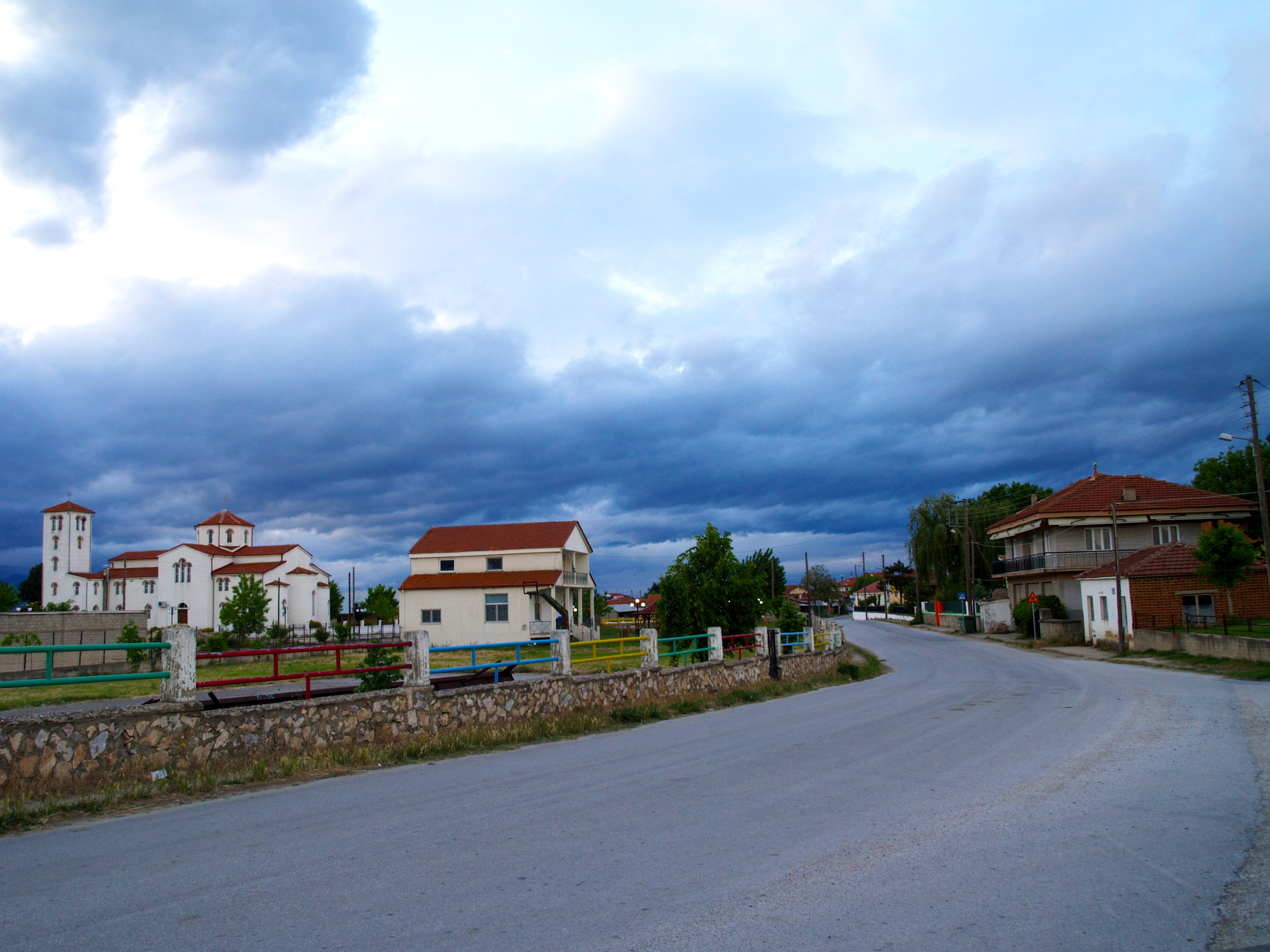

- Location within Greece
- Coordinates: 40°46′55″N 21°29′5″E
- Country: Greece
- Geographic region: Macedonia
- Administrative region: Western Macedonia
- Regional unit: Florina
- Municipality: Florina
- Municipal unit: Perasma

Population (2021)
  - Community: 1,077
- Time zone: UTC+2 (EET)
  - Summer (DST): UTC+3 (EEST)

Ammochori (Greek: Αμμοχώρι, before 1927: Πεσόνιτσα – Pesonitsa; Macedonian/Bulgarian: Песочница, Pesochnitsa) is a village in Florina regional unit, Western Macedonia, Greece.

The 1920 Greek census recorded 796 people in the village, and 60 inhabitants (8 families) were Muslim in 1923. Following the Greek–Turkish population exchange, Greek refugee families in Pesonitsa were from Asia Minor (2), Pontus (29) and the Caucasus (17) in 1926. The 1928 Greek census recorded 1,092 village inhabitants. In 1928, the refugee families numbered 49 (195 people).
