= Valtonera =

Valtonera Βαλτόνερα
- Community
- Location within Greece
- Coordinates: 40°37′59″N 21°34′59″E
- Country: Greece
- Administrative region: West Macedonia
- Regional unit: Florina
- Municipality: Amyntaio
- Municipal unit: Aetos
- Elevation: 600 m (2,000 ft)

Population (2021)
  - Community: 172
- Time zone: UTC+2 (EET)
  - Summer (DST): UTC+3 (EEST)
- Postal code: 530 75
- Area code: 23860

Valtonera (Greek: Βαλτόνερα; before 1928: Κάτω Νεβόλιανη – Kato Nevoliani) is a small village in the region of Florina, northern Greece. According to the 2021 Greek census the village had 172 inhabitants. The village is located in the small plain of the municipality of Amyntaio.

== Demographics ==
The 1920 Greek census recorded 171 people in the village, and 171 inhabitants (33 families) were Muslim in 1923. Following the Greek–Turkish population exchange, Greek refugee families in Kato Nevoliani were from the Caucasus (54) in 1926. The 1928 Greek census recorded 219 village inhabitants. In 1928, the refugee families numbered 54 (168 people).

Valtonera had 358 inhabitants in 1981. In fieldwork done by anthropologist Riki Van Boeschoten in late 1993, Valtonera was populated by a Greek population descended from Anatolian Greek refugees who arrived during the population exchange, Slavophones and Aromanians. Pontic Greek was spoken in the village by people over 30 in public and private settings. Children understood the language, but mostly did not use it.

== Culture ==
The Association «Proodos» (Progress) was founded by the residents of the village in 1981, while the sports club «Thyella» (Storm) is based in the village. The church of the village which holds an annual festival on 21 May is dedicated to Saints Constantine and Helena.

In 2003 Dimitra Koutsouridou of Valtonera entered the Guinness World Records, gathering a total of 8,514 pencil sharpeners, which are located and exhibited at the Elementary School of the village.
