= Farangi, Florina =

Farangi Φαράγγι
- Community
- Location within Greece
- Coordinates: 40°42′45″N 21°47′18″E
- Country: Greece
- Geographic region: Macedonia
- Administrative region: Western Macedonia
- Regional unit: Florina
- Municipality: Amyntaio
- Municipal unit: Filotas

Population (2021)
  - Community: 123
- Time zone: UTC+2 (EET)
  - Summer (DST): UTC+3 (EEST)

Farangi (Greek: Φαράγγι, before 1927: Οκλεμέζ – Oklemez) is a village in Florina Regional Unit, Macedonia, Greece.

The 1920 Greek census recorded 250 people in the village, and 250 inhabitants were Muslim in 1923. Following the Greek–Turkish population exchange, Greek refugee families in Oklemez were from Asia Minor (28) in 1926. The 1928 Greek census recorded 135 village inhabitants. In 1928, the refugee families numbered 26 (109 people).
