= Polypotamo =

Polypotamo Πολυπόταμο
- Community

- Location within Greece
- Coordinates: 40°43′3″N 21°22′1″E
- Country: Greece
- Geographic region: Macedonia
- Administrative region: Western Macedonia
- Regional unit: Florina
- Municipality: Florina
- Municipal unit: Perasma

Population (2021)
  - Community: 243
- Time zone: UTC+2 (EET)
  - Summer (DST): UTC+3 (EEST)

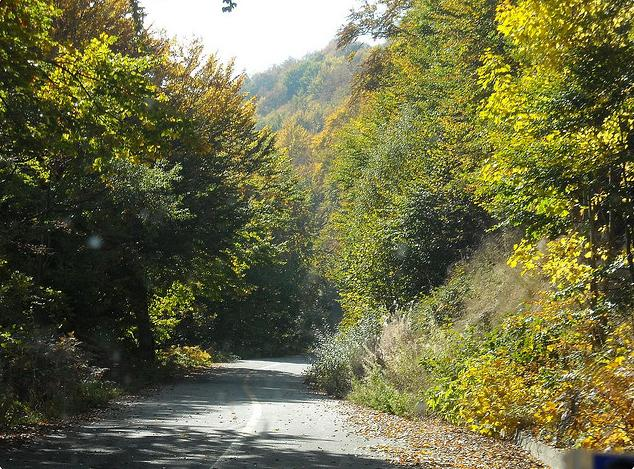
Photo taken on the national road between Kastoria and Florina, via Vitsi Mountain and near the village of Polypotamo in Florina Prefecture.

Polypotamo (Greek: Πολυπόταμο, before 1927: Νερέτη – Nereti) is a village in Florina Regional Unit, Macedonia, Greece.

Pre–war and post–war immigration from Polypotamo led to the formation of a diaspora and most of the village population lives abroad in the northern suburbs of Melbourne in Australia.

In fieldwork done by anthropologist Riki Van Boeschoten in late 1993, Polypotamo was populated by Slavophones. The Macedonian language was used by people of all ages, both in public and private settings, and as the main language for interpersonal relationships. Some elderly villagers had little knowledge of Greek.

Anthropologist Loring Danforth (1997) wrote 1,500 people from the village resided in Melbourne, Australia with most identifying as Macedonian. People who live in the village itself all identify as Greek.
