= Kladorrachi =

- Community
- Location within Greece
- Coordinates: 40.827045°N 21.396005°E
- Country: Greece
- Administrative region: West Macedonia
- Regional unit: Florina
- Municipality: Florina
- Elevation: 660 m (2,170 ft)

Population (2021)
  - Community: 75
- Time zone: UTC+2 (EET)
  - Summer (DST): UTC+3 (EEST)
- Postal code: 531 00

Kladorrachi (Greek: Κλαδορράχη, before 1926: Κλαδοράπη – Kladorapi) is a village in the Florina regional unit, West Macedonia, Greece. It has also been known as Kladorrachi, Kladorobi, Kladorahi, Kladorohi, Kladorabi and Kladoraki. Since the 2011 local government reform it is part of the municipality of Florina. It was previously part of the municipality of Kato Kleines. It is located 5 km (3.1 mi) north of the city of Florina.

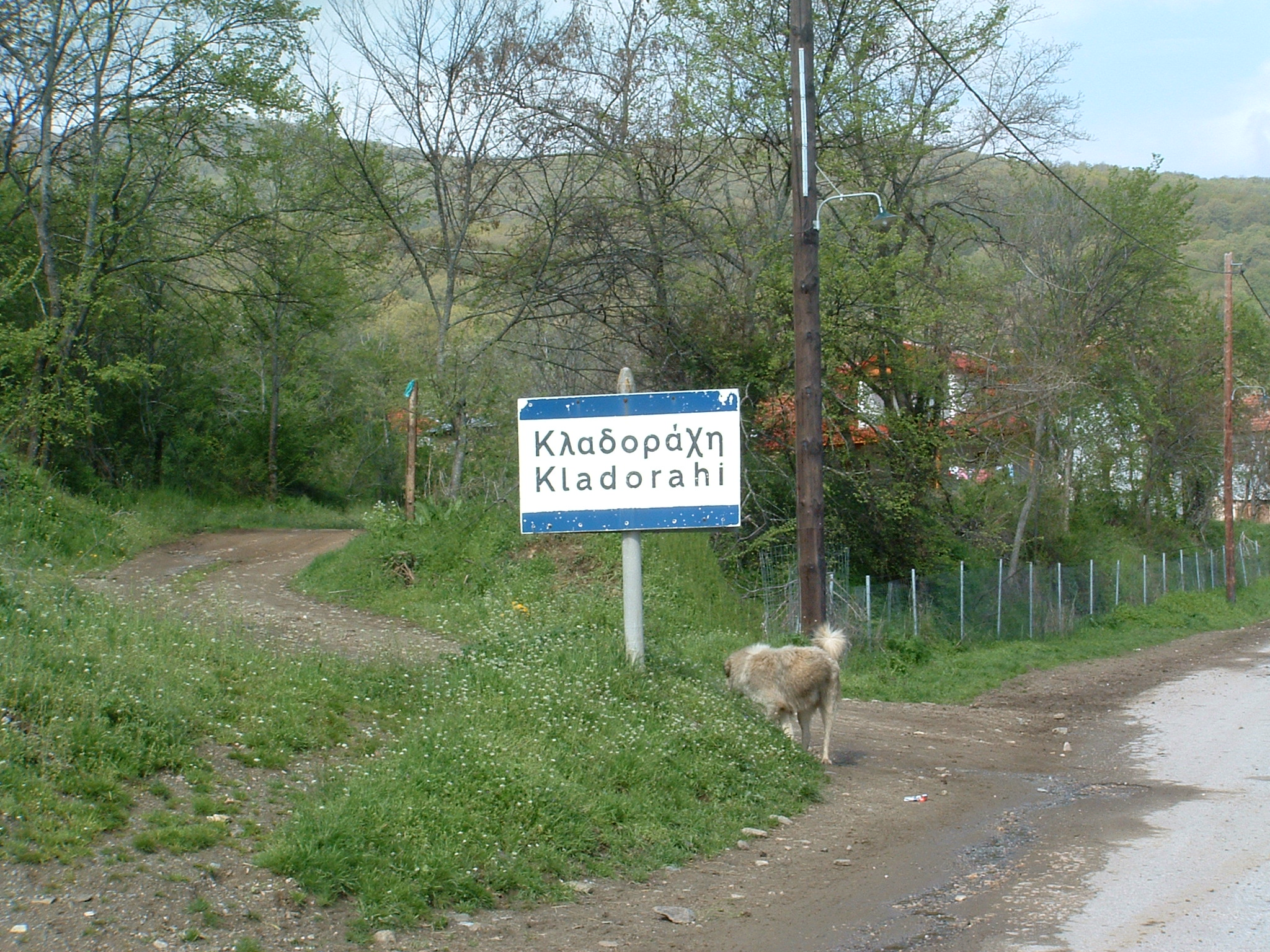
Kladorrachi town sign

== Places of Worship ==
The church of St. Procopius, built in 1874, is located in the village centre.
The St. George's cemetery chapel located in the village was built in 1919.

The Holy Monastery of the Assumption of the Virgin Mary (Koimisis tis Theotokou) is to be found 1.9 km (1.2 mi) to the west of Kladorrachi. It was built in 1803, rebuilt after a fire in 1880 and restored in 1955. Next to it is the colourful church of the Virgin Mary.

== Landmarks ==
During World War 2, on August 9, 1943, the Germans sought retribution after the death of a German officer in an ambush by a resistance group on the Florina to Kladorrachi road. They initially demanded the hanging of 15 Greek citizens, and raised the number to 50 in the event that two other German prisoners were not released.

The first Greek to be arrested was Theodoros Thomaidis, the maestro of the Aristotelis Cultural Association's choir. He was hanged in the gallows side-by-side with the priest of a nearby village, a woodcutter, two members of the local Jewish community, and 10 more victims from surrounding villages.

Their bodies were left for three days at the site of their hanging as a warning. The two German prisoners were subsequently released and thus 35 more citizens were saved from hanging.

After the bodies were taken down from the gallows and buried, Evangelos Katergaris, a member of the Aristotelis Association, cut the noose with which Thomaidis was hanged and kept it in his home for 20 years. The noose was later turned over to the association and preserved as a legacy.

A memorial was erected, which lists all those hanged.

== Demographics ==
An Ottoman defter of 1481 recorded 108 households in the village.

In fieldwork done by anthropologist Riki Van Boeschoten in late 1993, Kladorrachi was populated by Slavophones. The Macedonian language was spoken in the village by people over 30 in public and private settings. Children understood the language, but mostly did not use it.

Many residents left in the 1950s and 1960s in search of a better life and went to the U.S., Canada, and Australia.

Historical population
Year	Pop.	±%
1905	384	—
1981	107	−72.1%
2001	75	−29.9%
2011	97	+29.3%
2021	75	−22.7%

== Gallery ==
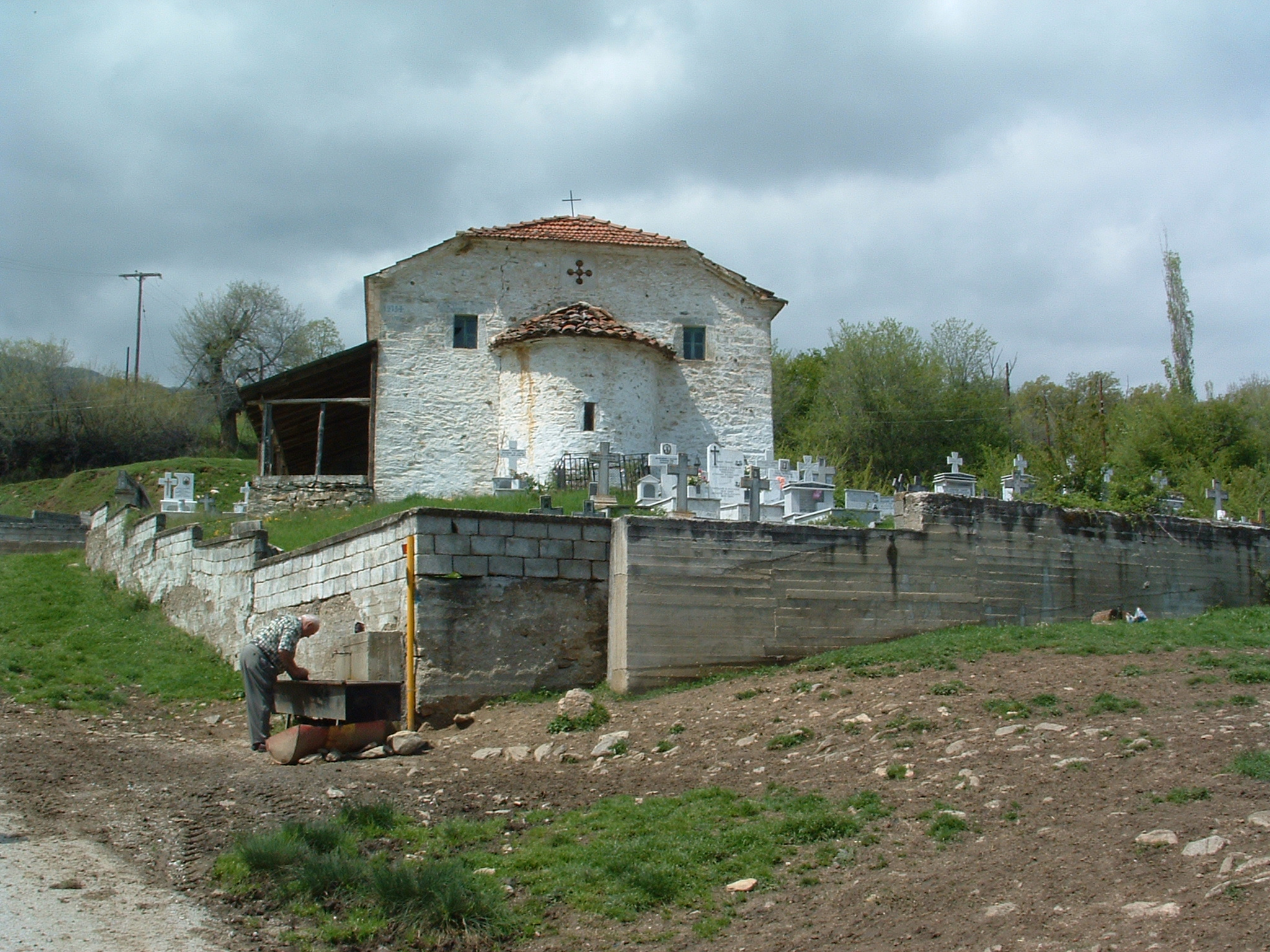
St George's cemetery chapel in Kladorrachi

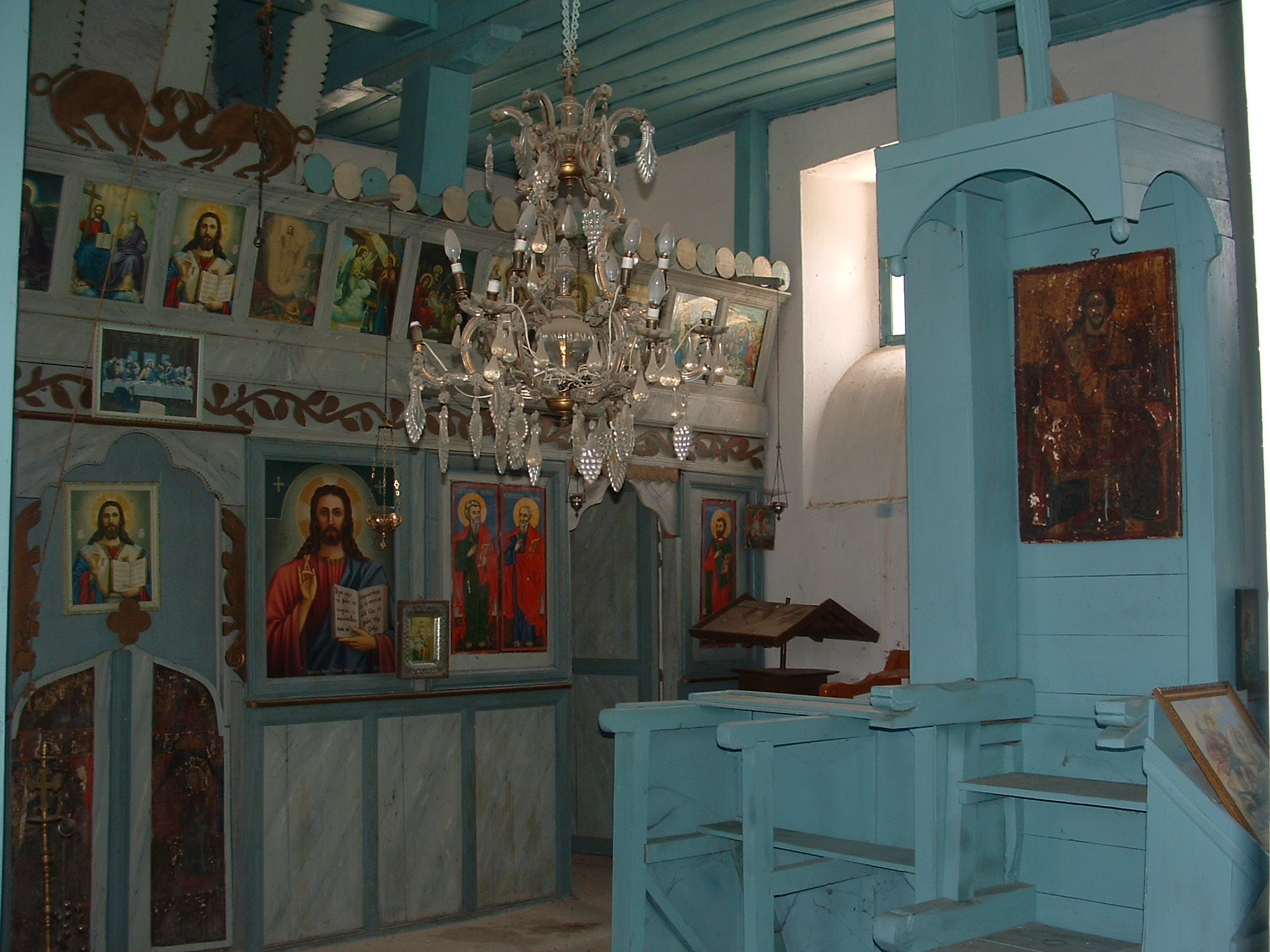
Interior of the St George's cemetery chapel in Kladorrachi

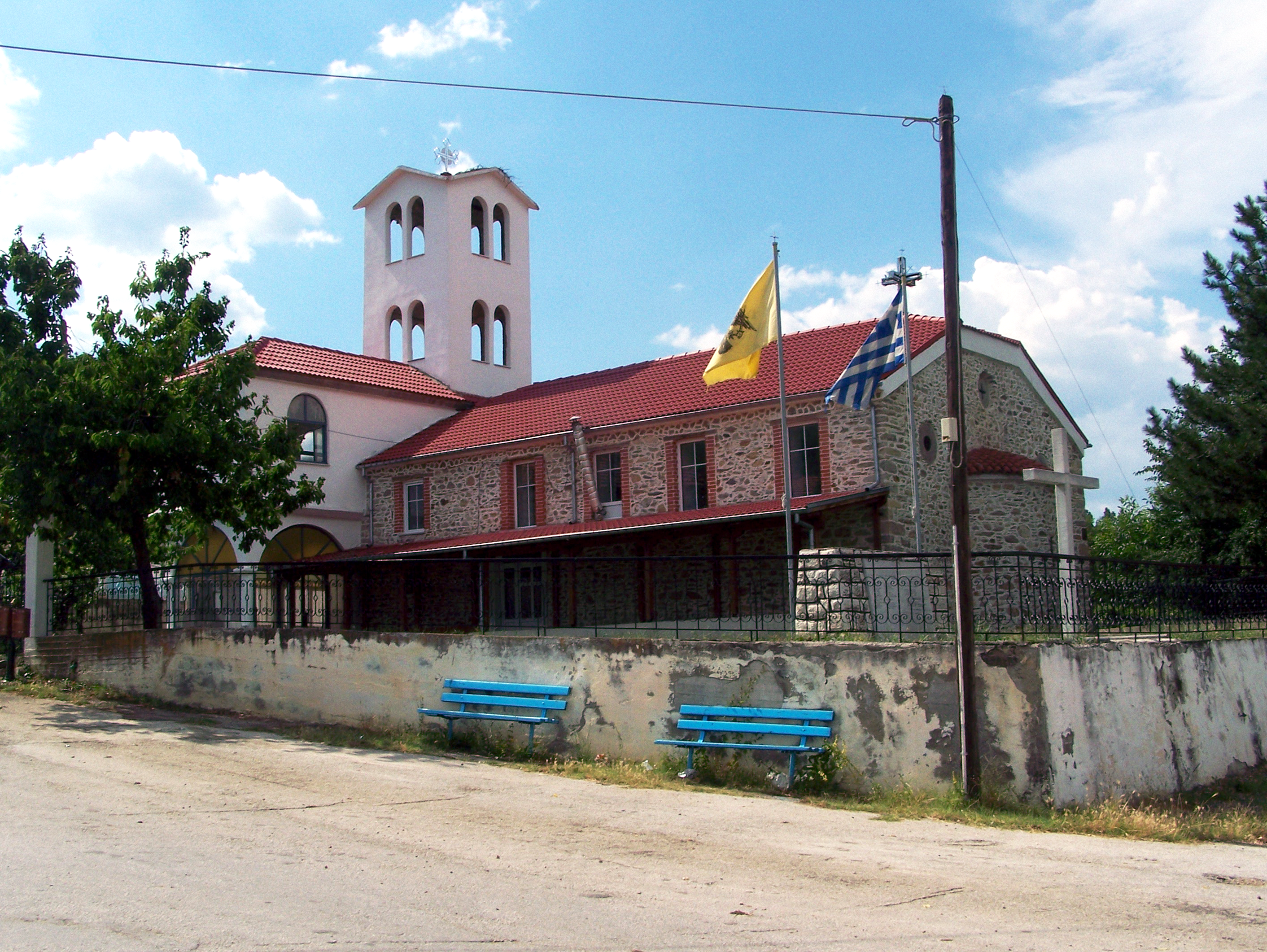
Church of St. Procopius in Kladorachi

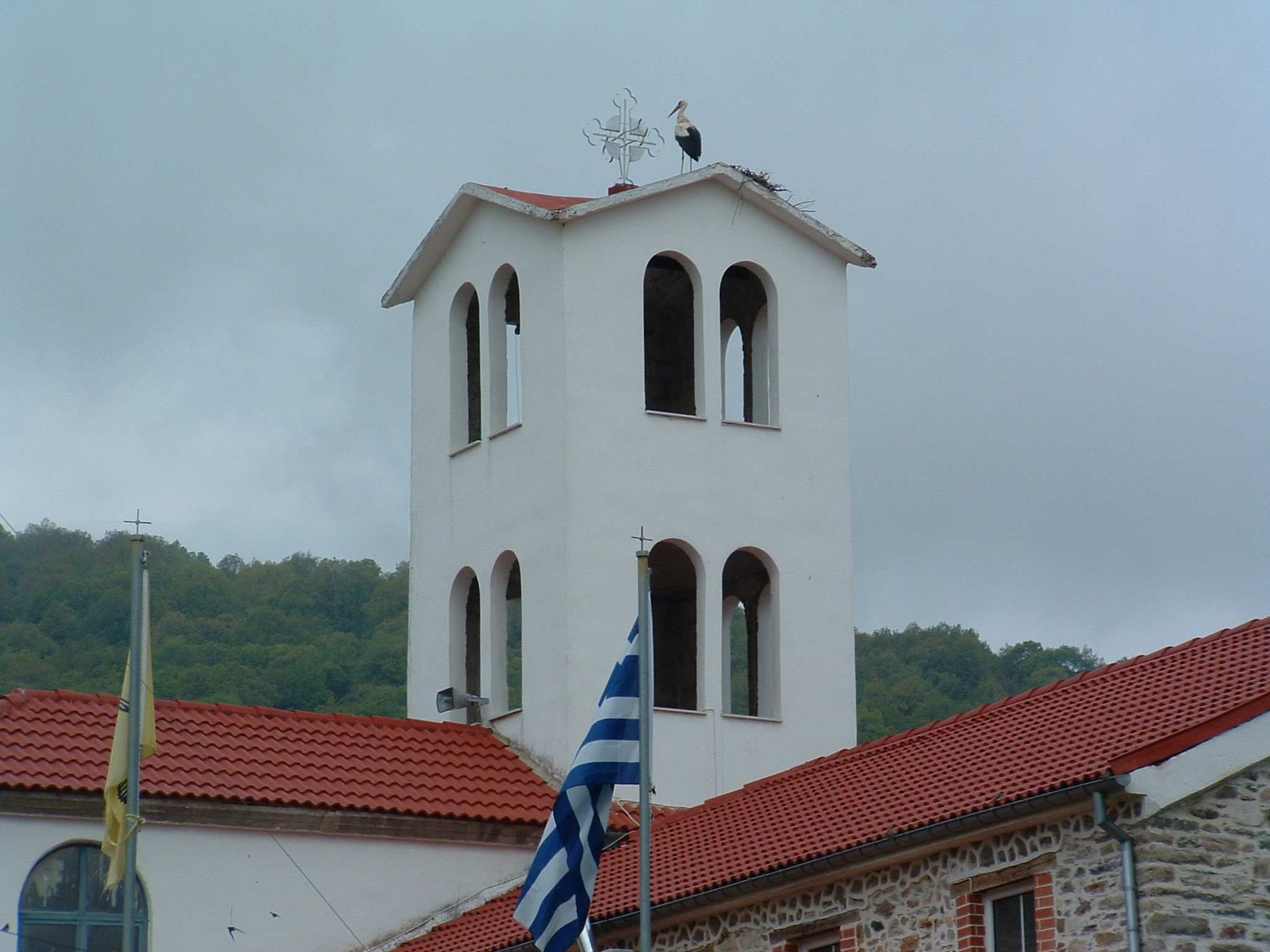
A stork on the top of the church of St. Procopius in Kladorrachi

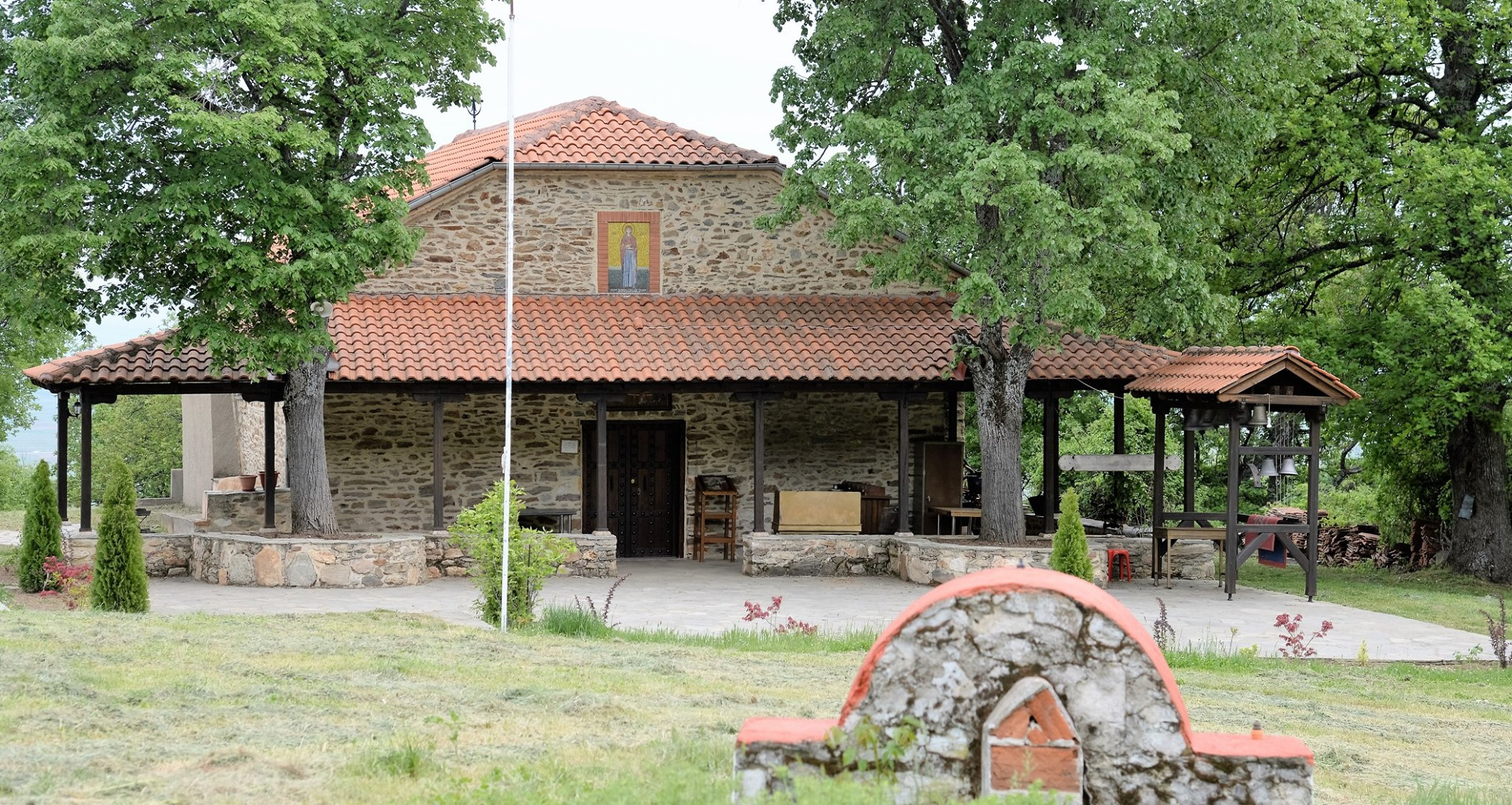
The Holy Monastery of the Assumption of the Virgin Mary was founded in Kladorachi in 1803

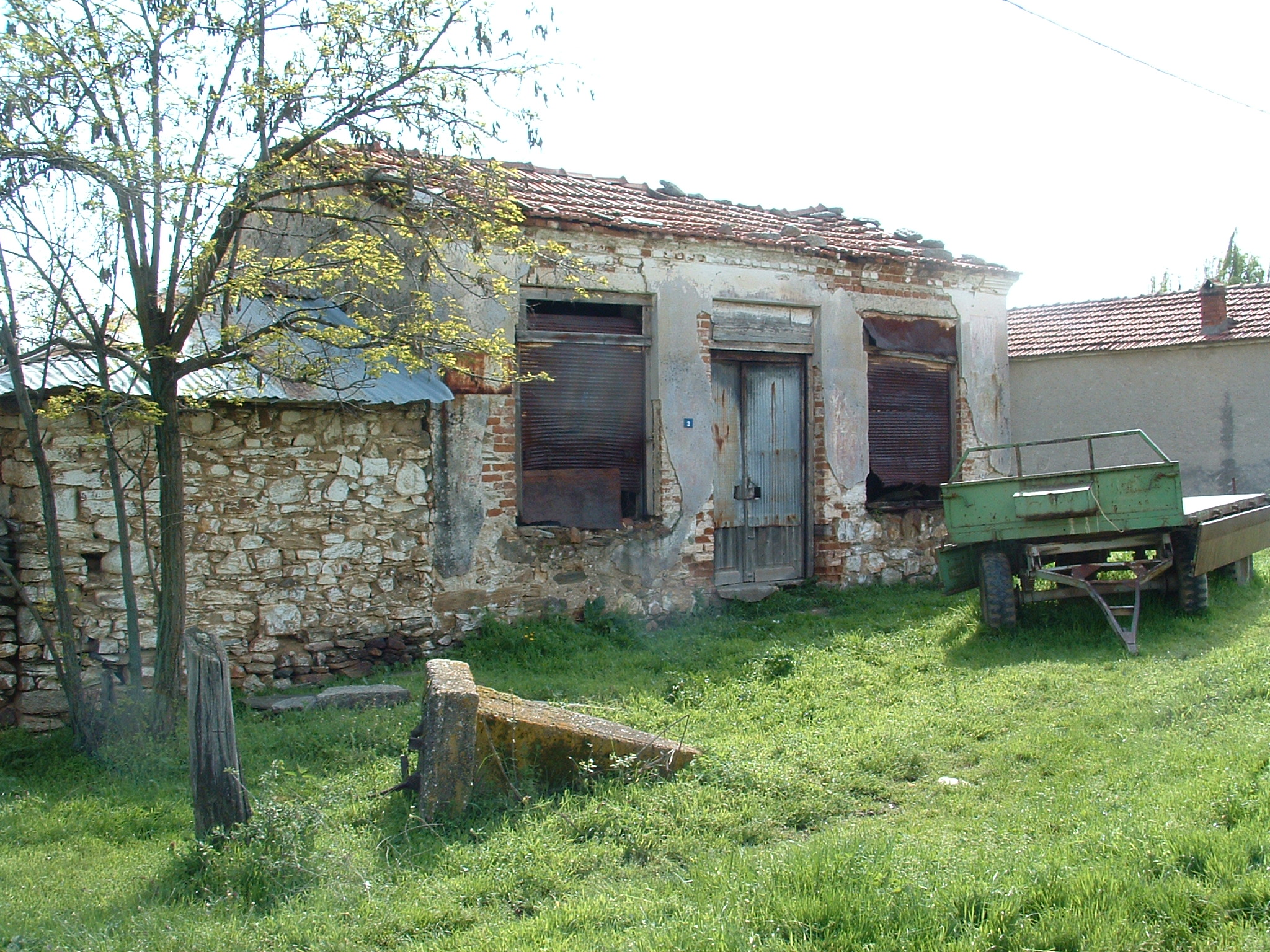
Derelict cafe in Kladorrachi

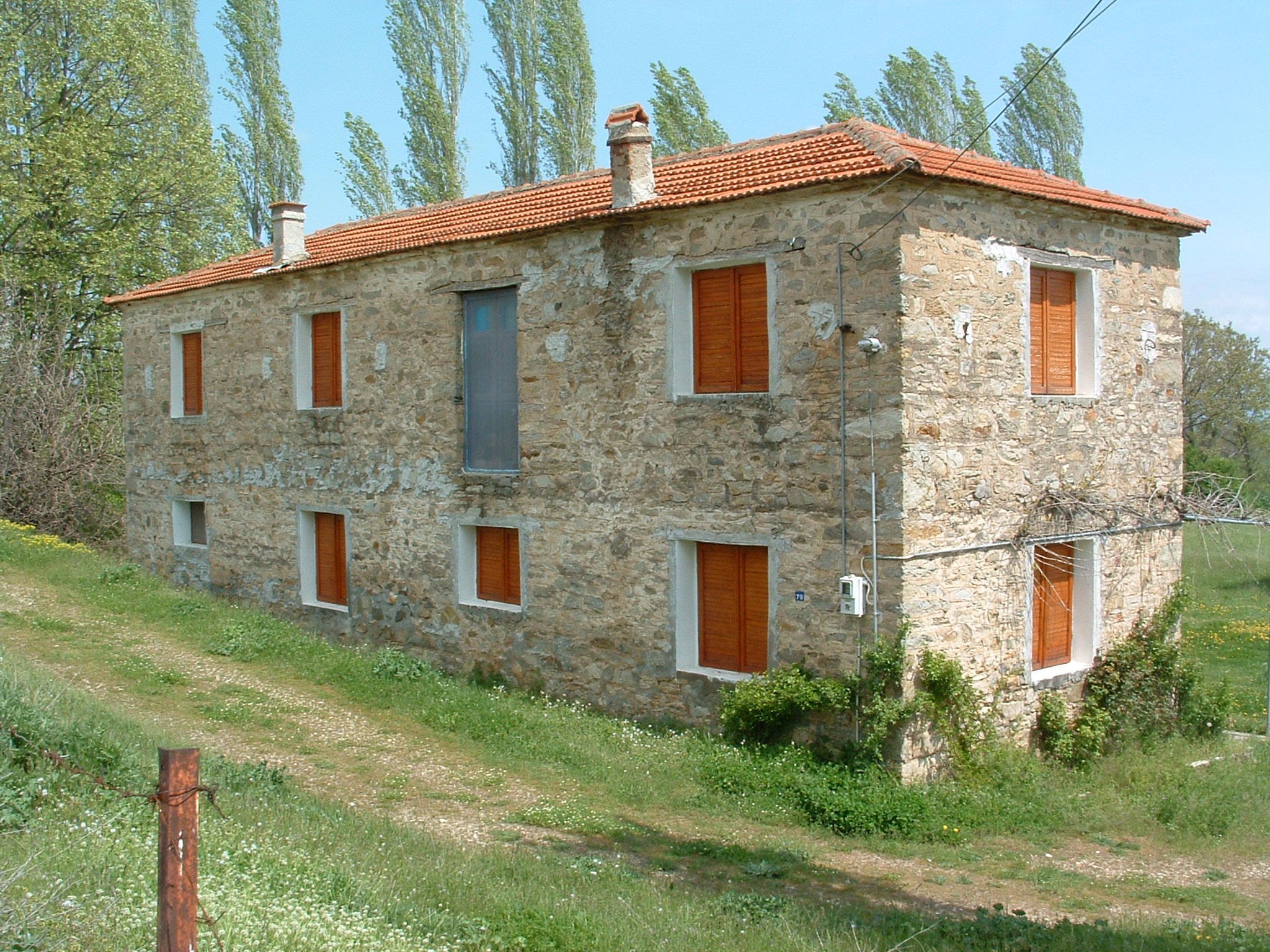
House in Kladorrachi

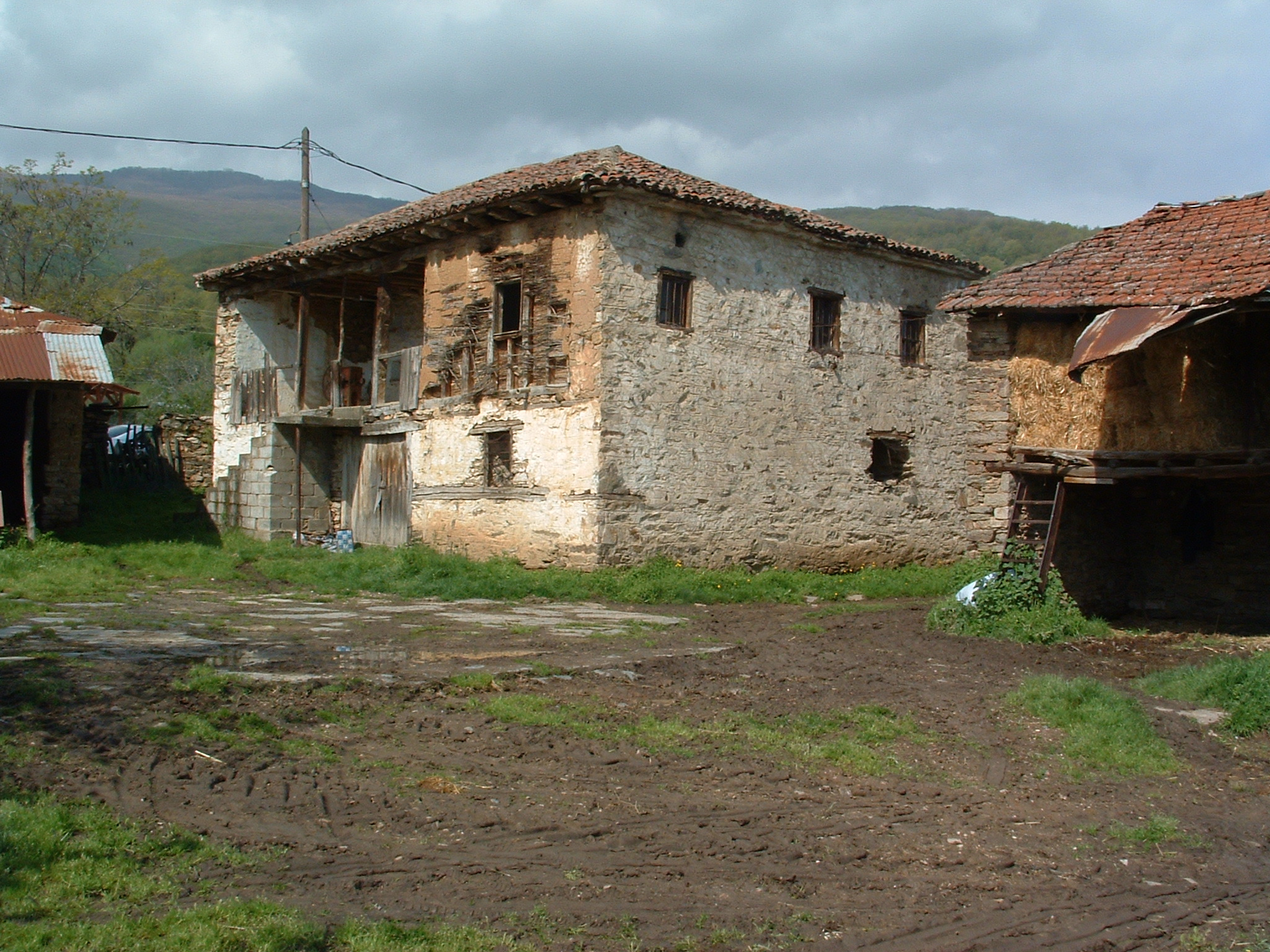
Abandoned house in Kladorrachi

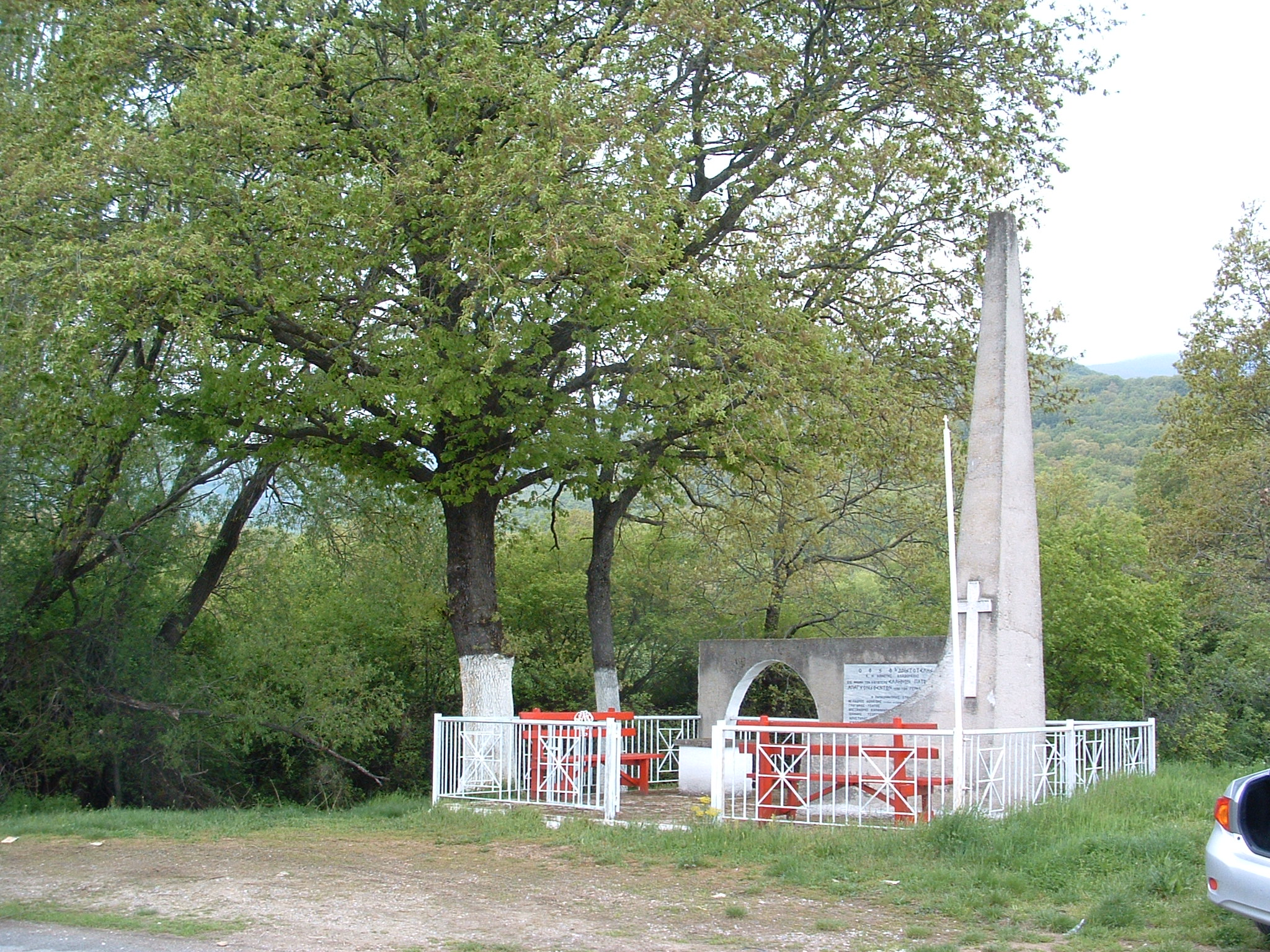
The memorial commemorating all those that were hanged in Kladorrachi on 9 August 1943

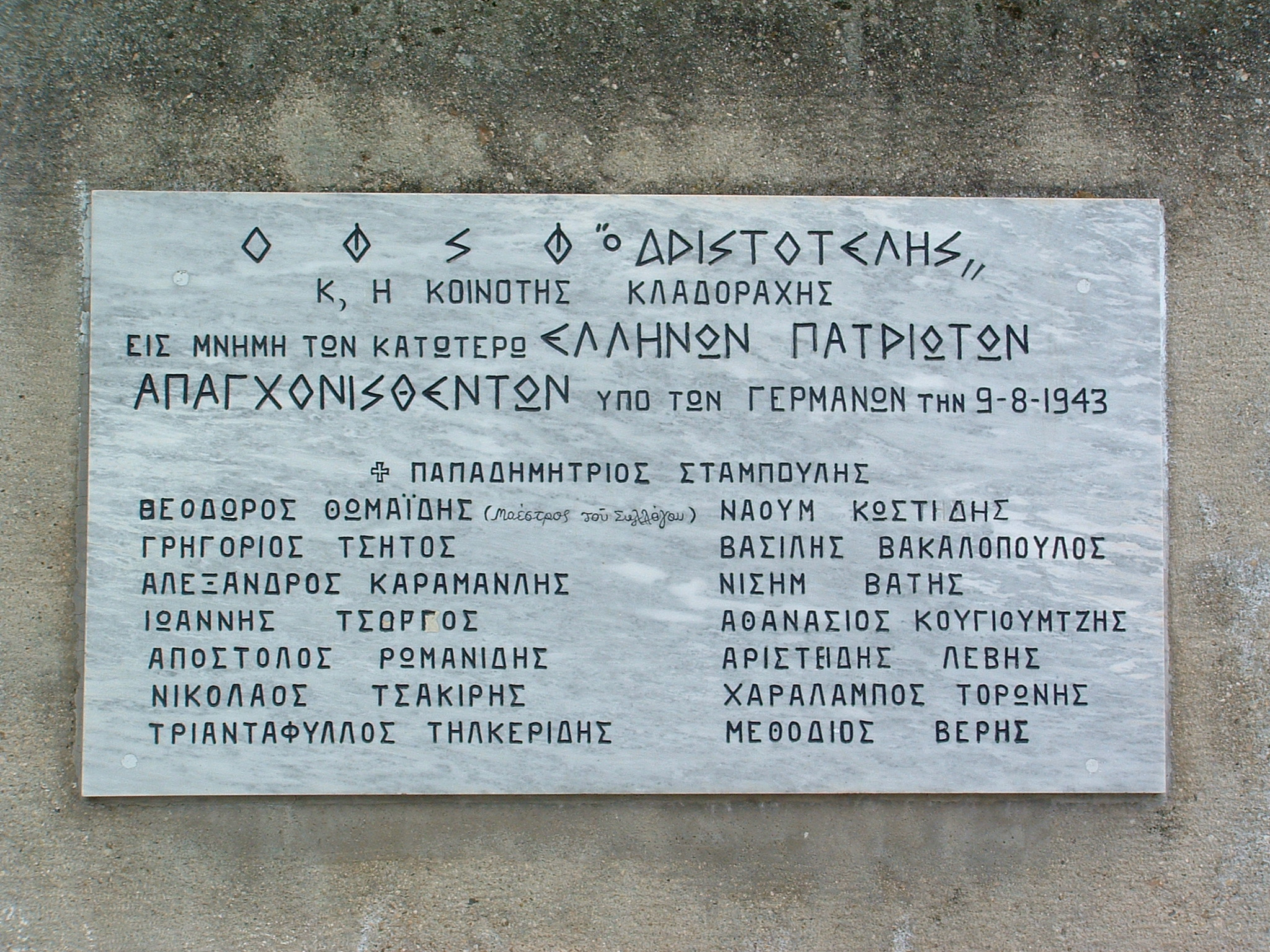
The memorial lists all those hanged in Kladorrachi on 9 August 1943
