= Mikrolimni =

Mikrolimni Μικρολίμνη
- Community
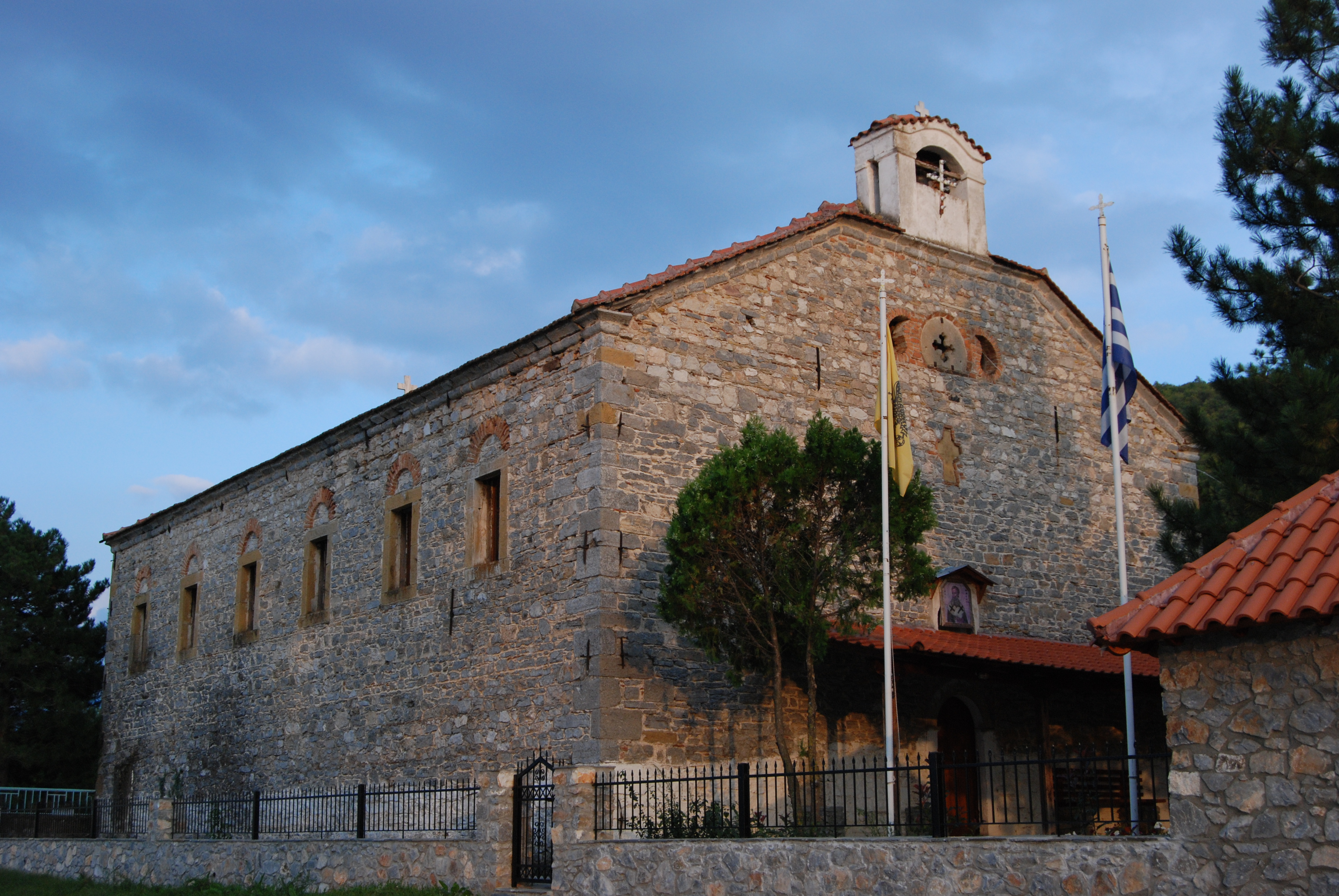
- Mikrolimni

- Location within Greece
- Coordinates: 40°44′43″N 21°6′55″E
- Country: Greece
- Administrative region: West Macedonia
- Regional unit: Florina
- Municipality: Prespes
- Municipal unit: Prespes

Population (2021)
  - Community: 40
- Time zone: UTC+2 (EET)
  - Summer (DST): UTC+3 (EEST)

Mikrolimni (Greek: Μικρολίμνη, before 1928: Λάγκα – Lagka) is a village in the Florina Regional Unit in West Macedonia, Greece.

== Demographics ==
Mikrolimni had 71 inhabitants in 1981. In fieldwork done by anthropologist Riki Van Boeschoten in late 1993, Mikrolimni was populated by Slavophones.
