= Lefkonas, Florina =

Lefkonas Λευκώνας
- Community
- Location within Greece
- Coordinates: 40°47′24″N 21°08′24″E
- Country: Greece
- Administrative region: West Macedonia
- Regional unit: Florina
- Municipality: Prespes
- Municipal unit: Prespes

Population (2021)
  - Community: 123
- Time zone: UTC+2 (EET)
  - Summer (DST): UTC+3 (EEST)

Lefkonas (Greek: Λευκώνας, before 1926: Πόπλη – Popli) is a village in the Florina Regional Unit in West Macedonia, Greece.

== Name ==
Macedonian speaking locals of Prespa call this village Попли, Popli. The forms of the toponym rendered with о, а and ъ indicate they emerged from a *o sound and would have originally been either Poplje or Pop'li from the Slavic *pop- pupak meaning navel, centre. Pianka Włodzimierz writes that Poplje would be unlikely as the retention of l in this instance would not occur per the sound change norms of the Macedonian language. Włodzimierz instead states that the toponym might have originally been *Po̧pъlje. The toponym ending would have been replaced with a Turkish suffix lu, due to the importance of the village as a centre for Ottoman administration. In Albanian, the village is called Pëpli.

== History ==
In the late 19th century, the village was the Ottoman administrative centre and seat of the müdir (district administrator) in the Lower Prespa area. Following the Greek-Turkish population exchange, the village mosque was demolished and the church of Michael the Archangel was built in its place. The village in the modern period is renowned for its landscaped gardens. The main agricultural crop grown in the village are beans.

== Demographics ==
In the 1860s, Popli had 50 Christian houses. In the early 1900s, 180 Slavonic speaking Christians and 210 Muslim Albanians lived in the village.

The 1920 Greek census recorded 492 people in the village, and 270 inhabitants (40 families) were Muslim in 1923. The Albanian village population was present until 1926 when they went to Turkey and were replaced with prosfiges (Greek refugees), due to the Greek–Turkish population exchange. In Popli, 41 Greek refugee families were from Asia Minor in 1926. The 1928 Greek census recorded 310 village inhabitants. In 1928, the refugee families numbered 41 (129 people). After the Greek Civil War, the Macedonian speaking population became a minority in the village.

Lefkonas had 127 inhabitants in 1981. In fieldwork done by anthropologist Riki Van Boeschoten in late 1993, Lefkonas was populated by a Greek population descended from Anatolian Greek refugees who arrived during the Greek–Turkish population exchange, and Slavophones.
