= Skopia, Florina =

Skopia
- Community

- Location within Greece
- Coordinates: 40°45′49″N 21°24′37″E
- Country: Greece
- Geographic region: Macedonia
- Administrative region: Western Macedonia
- Regional unit: Florina
- Municipality: Florina
- Municipal unit: Florina

Population (2021)
  - Community: 508
- Time zone: UTC+2 (EET)
  - Summer (DST): UTC+3 (EEST)

Skopia (Greek: Σκοπιά, before 1928: Άνω Νεβόλιανη – Ano Nevoliani, Before 1913: Macedonian: Горно Неволјани) Gorno Nevoljani) is a village in Florina Regional Unit, Macedonia, Greece.

Philologist André Mazon was in Ano Nevolani. In 1917, the village had 1300 people and composed of 230 Christian houses and 60 Turkish houses. Mazon wrote that the Christian population due to Bulgarian efforts were Exarchists until the village came under Greek governance, thereafter the children began learning Greek at school, but did not use the language among themselves. The Turks of Ano Nevolani were Turkicized Albanians, the adults knew Albanian and the young only Turkish.

The 1920 Greek census recorded 1,520 people in the village, and 350 inhabitants (59 families) were Muslim in 1923. Following the Greek–Turkish population exchange, Greek refugee families in Ano Nevoliani were from East Thrace (3) and from Asia Minor (22) in 1926. The 1928 Greek census recorded 1,478 village inhabitants. In 1928, the refugee families numbered 20 (121 people). The village mosque was demolished in 1929.

Pre–war and post–war immigration from Skopia led to the formation of a diaspora and most of the village population lives abroad in the northern suburbs of Melbourne in Australia.
