= Limnochori, Florina =

Limnochori Λιμνοχώρι
- Community
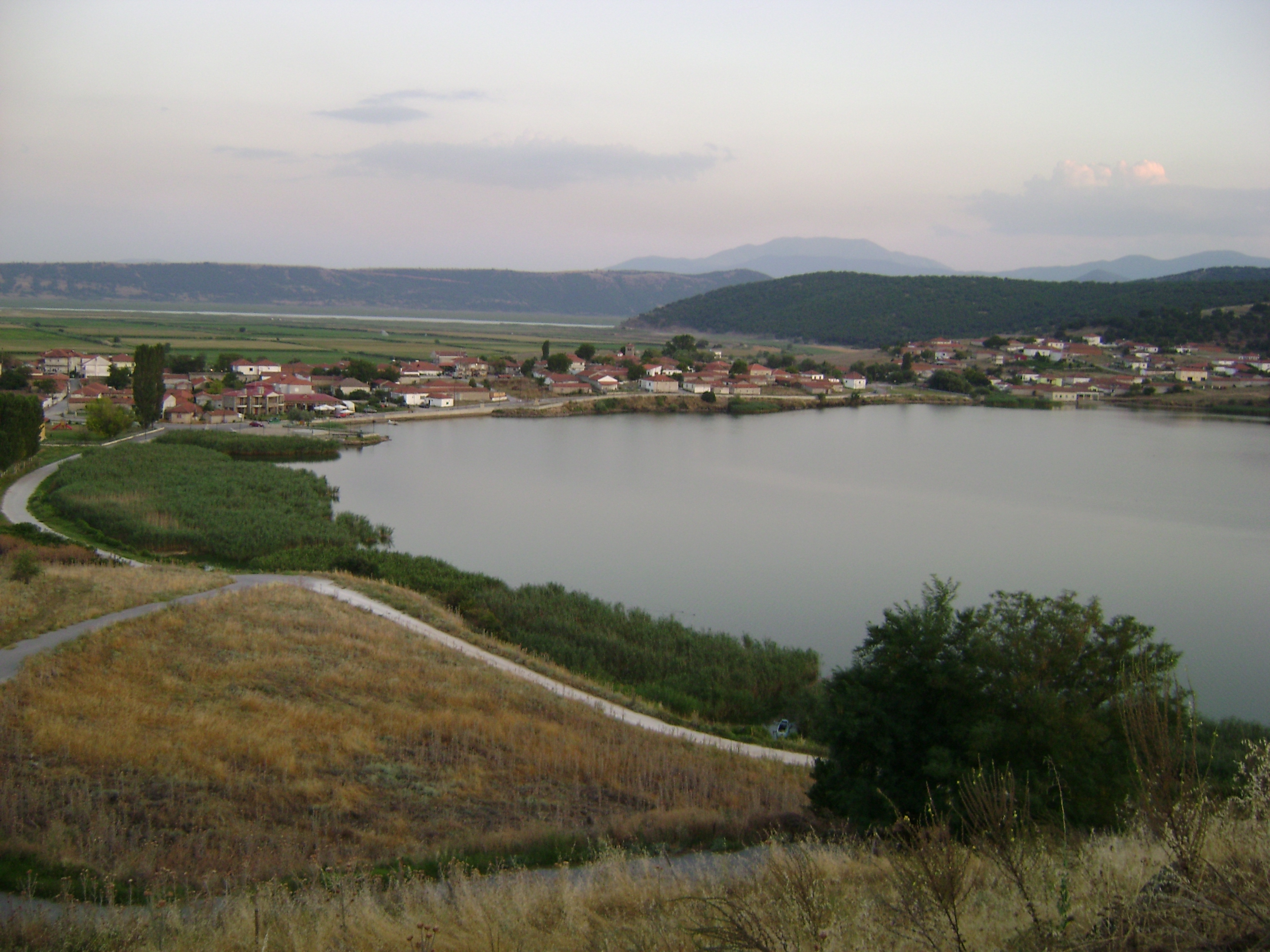
- Limnochori

- Location within Greece
- Coordinates: 40°37′21″N 21°33′24″E
- Country: Greece
- Geographic region: Macedonia
- Administrative region: Western Macedonia
- Regional unit: Florina
- Municipality: Amyntaio
- Municipal unit: Aetos

Population (2021)
  - Community: 184
- Time zone: UTC+2 (EET)
  - Summer (DST): UTC+3 (EEST)

Limnochori (Greek: Λιμνοχώρι, before 1926: Τσερκέζκιοϊ – Tserkezkioi, alternative old name: Άγιοι Θεόδωροι – Agioi Theodoroi) is a village in Florina Regional Unit, Macedonia, Greece.

The 1920 Greek census recorded 122 people in the village, and 122 inhabitants (30 families) were Muslim in 1923. Following the Greek–Turkish population exchange, Greek refugee families in Tserkezkioi were from the Caucasus (27) and five others from an unidentified location in 1926. In 1928 there were 37 refugee families (126 people). After the population exchange, the village mosque was demolished and replaced with a community store.
