= Kallithea, Florina =

Kallithea Καλλιθέα
- Community
- Location within Greece
- Coordinates: 40°47′56″N 21°9′17″E
- Country: Greece
- Administrative region: West Macedonia
- Regional unit: Florina
- Municipality: Prespes
- Municipal unit: Prespes

Population (2021)
  - Community: 107
- Time zone: UTC+2 (EET)
  - Summer (DST): UTC+3 (EEST)

Kallithea (Greek: Καλλιθέα, before 1928: Ρούδαρι – Roudari) is a village in the Florina Regional Unit in West Macedonia, Greece.

The church of St. Athanasius was built in the 19th century. The main agricultural crop grown in the village are beans.

== Demographics ==
In the early 1900s, 270 Slavonic speaking Christians lived in the village. After the Greek Civil War, only 10 Macedonian speaking families remained and the abandoned houses of those that fled were settled by Aromanians. They were from a group of nomadic transhumant Aromanians known as the Arvanitovlachs, and the Greek government assisted them to settle in depopulated villages of the Prespa region like Kallithea during the 1950s. The Aromanians originated from Giannitsa and the region of Epirus.

Kallithea had 170 inhabitants in 1981. In fieldwork done by anthropologist Riki Van Boeschoten in late 1993, Kallithea was populated by Aromanians and Slavophones.
