= Maniaki, Florina =

Maniaki Μανιάκι
- Community

- Location within Greece
- Coordinates: 40°41′30″N 21°46′30″E
- Country: Greece
- Geographic region: Macedonia
- Administrative region: Western Macedonia
- Regional unit: Florina
- Municipality: Amyntaio
- Municipal unit: Filotas

Population (2021)
  - Community: 411
- Time zone: UTC+2 (EET)
  - Summer (DST): UTC+3 (EEST)

Maniaki (Greek: Μανιάκι, before 1927: Κολάρτζα – Kolartza) is a village in Florina Regional Unit, Macedonia, Greece.

The 1920 Greek census recorded 541 people in the village, and 540 inhabitants were Muslim in 1923. Following the Greek–Turkish population exchange, Greek refugee families in Kolartza were from Pontus (55) in 1926. The 1928 Greek census recorded 242 village inhabitants. In 1928, the refugee families numbered 58 (219 people).
