= Platy, Florina =

Platy
- Community
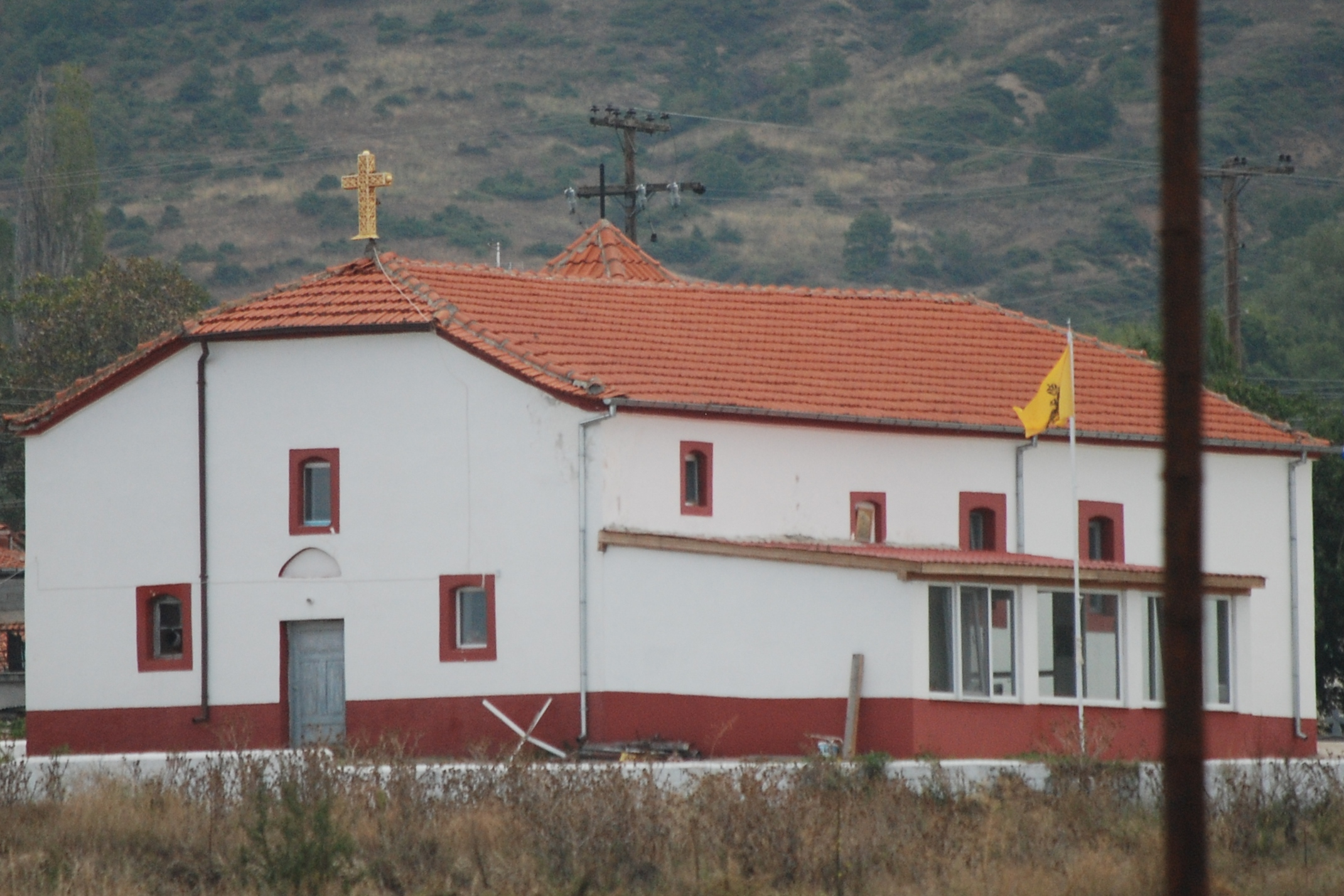

- Location within Greece
- Coordinates: 40°48′50″N 21°7′57″E
- Country: Greece
- Administrative region: Western Macedonia
- Regional unit: Florina
- Municipality: Prespes
- Municipal unit: Prespes
- Community: Platy

Population (2021)
  - Community: 85
- Time zone: UTC+2 (EET)
  - Summer (DST): UTC+3 (EEST)

Platy or Plati (Greek: Πλατύ, before 1927: Στέρκοβο – Sterkovo, also: Στύρκοβα, Styrkova; Macedonian: Штрково, Štrkovo) is a village in Florina Regional Unit, Western Macedonia, Greece. The village has an altitude of 900 m (3,000 ft).

The total land area of the village Platy is 712 hectares, with a majority as grasslands and for agricultural use, followed by forest, inland marshes and waters under its jurisdiction. Some of the architecture of Platy consists of old stone houses. The modern village economy is based on agriculture and livestock. The main agricultural crop grown in the village are beans. The soils in the surrounding hills of Platy have undergone extensive soil erosion, due to agricultural and grazing over use. In Platy, nests made by storks are at the highest elevation in all Greece, at 907 m (2,976 ft).

The name of the village is derived from the Slavic word Štrk for stork and the suffix ovo. The church of St. Nicholas was built in 1591. A Christian village, the inhabitants were members of the Bulgarian Exarchate. During World War I, Sterkovo hosted refugees from the nearby village of Opaya, while high rates of malaria were present due to the effects of conflict. The population of the village was 215 in 1920, 253 in 1928 and 268 in 1940.

In the Greek Civil War, the village was occupied by the Democratic Army of Greece (DAG). Platy was part of a logistics supply route from Albania used by DAG during the civil war. Toward the end of the civil war, the majority of villagers fled to Yugoslavia and other countries in Eastern Europe. The Macedonian speaking children of the village were evacuated to Yugoslav Macedonia, they travelled through Yugoslavia and Hungary and later went to Czechoslovakia were they were hosted in refugee centres in Mikulov and Brno. A few residents remained and the Greek government resettled the village with Greek refugees who originated from Asia Minor. The population numbered 133 in 1951, 154 in 1961, 67 in 1981 and 73 in 2011. The modern village population is small and in decline.
