= Armenochori, Greece =

Village in Western Macedonia, Greece

Armenochori, Armenovo Αρμενοχώρι, Арменово
- Community
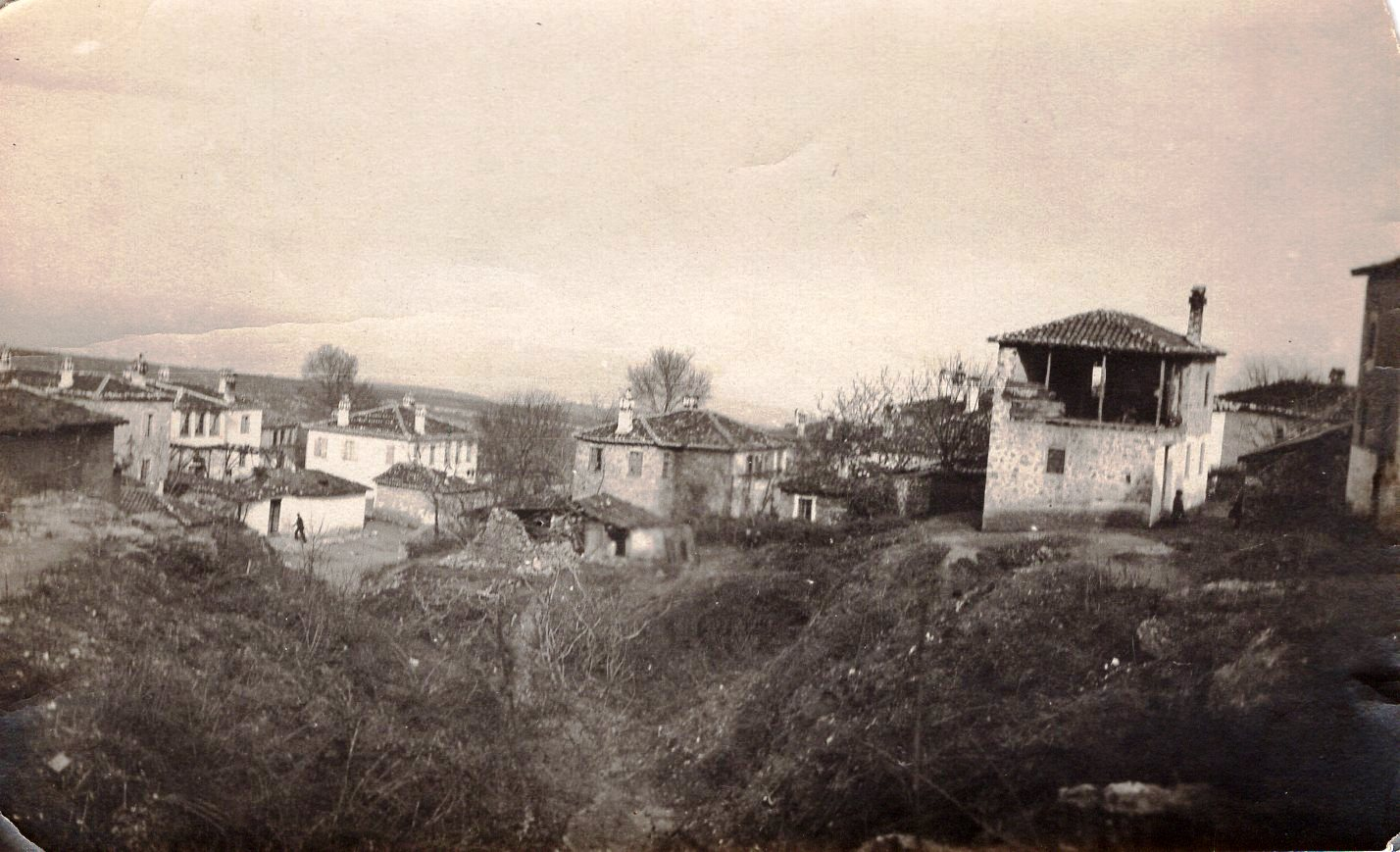
- Armenochori (c. 1915-1916)

- Location within Greece
- Coordinates: 40°48′N 21°28′E
- Country: Greece
- Administrative region: West Macedonia
- Regional unit: Florina
- Municipality: Florina
- Municipal unit: Florina

Population (2021)
  - Community: 846
- Time zone: UTC+2 (EET)
  - Summer (DST): UTC+3 (EEST)
- Postal code: 531 00
- Vehicle registration: ΡΑ

Armenochori (Greek: Αρμενοχώρι; Macedonian: Арменоро, Armenoro; Bulgarian: Арменово, Armenovo or Арменохор, Armenohor) is a village in the Florina regional unit, northern Greece. It is situated along the Greek National Road 2, 4 km northeast of Florina.

== Demographics ==
In 1845 the Russian slavist Victor Grigorovich recorded Arminor as mainly Bulgarian village. According to the statistics of geographer Dimitri Mishev (D. M. Brancoff), the town had a total Christian population of 776 in 1905, consisting of 424 Patriarchist Bulgarians (Grecomans) and 352 Exarchist Bulgarians. It also had 2 schools, 1 Bulgarian and 1 Greek.

The 1920 Greek census recorded 871 people in the village, and 40 inhabitants (6 families) were Muslim in 1923. Following the Greek–Turkish population exchange, Greek refugee families in Armenochori were from Pontus (36) in 1926. The 1928 Greek census recorded 1,045 village inhabitants. In 1928, the refugee families numbered 36 (151 people) .

Armenochori had 1046 inhabitants in 1981. In fieldwork done by anthropologist Riki Van Boeschoten in late 1993, Armenochori was populated by Slavophones and a Greek population descended from Anatolian Greek refugees who arrived during the Greek–Turkish population exchange. The Macedonian language was spoken in the village by people over 30 in public and private settings. Children understood the language, but mostly did not use it. Pontic Greek was spoken by people over 60, mainly in private.

== Culture ==
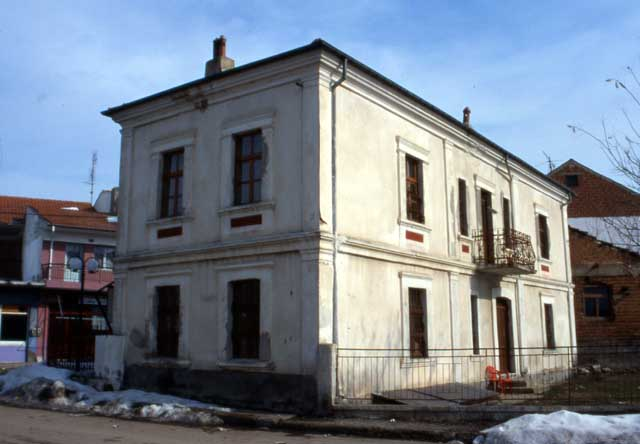
The Folklore Museum of Armenochori, housed in the former Bulgarian Exarchate school

In 1990 the Armenochori Cultural Society started collecting objects from folk culture which led to the creation of the Folklore Collection. The collection is housed in the old primary school of Armenochori in the centre of the village. Displayed in the three rooms of the building are objects from folk culture, which come exclusively from the families of Armenochori. There are men's and women's traditional costumes, domestic utensils, various metal, earthenware or wooden objects used in the home, objects relating to cottage industry, the most notable among them being a nineteenth-century loom, farming tools and tools of a number of other occupations, as well as the old pulpit from the village church.
