= Paroria =

Paroria may refer to:

- Paroria (fictional world), a RPG world in Minecraft
- Paroria (ancient city), an ancient city in Arcadia, Greece
- Paroria (region), a medieval monastic region in Strandzha, Bulgaria
- Parori, a village in Arcadia, Greece
