= Prasino, Florina =

Prasino
- Community
- Location within Greece
- Coordinates: 40°43′34″N 21°11′51″E
- Country: Greece
- Administrative region: Western Macedonia
- Regional unit: Florina
- Municipality: Prespes
- Municipal unit: Prespes
- Community: Prasino

Population (2021)
  - Community: 18
- Time zone: UTC+2 (EET)
  - Summer (DST): UTC+3 (EEST)

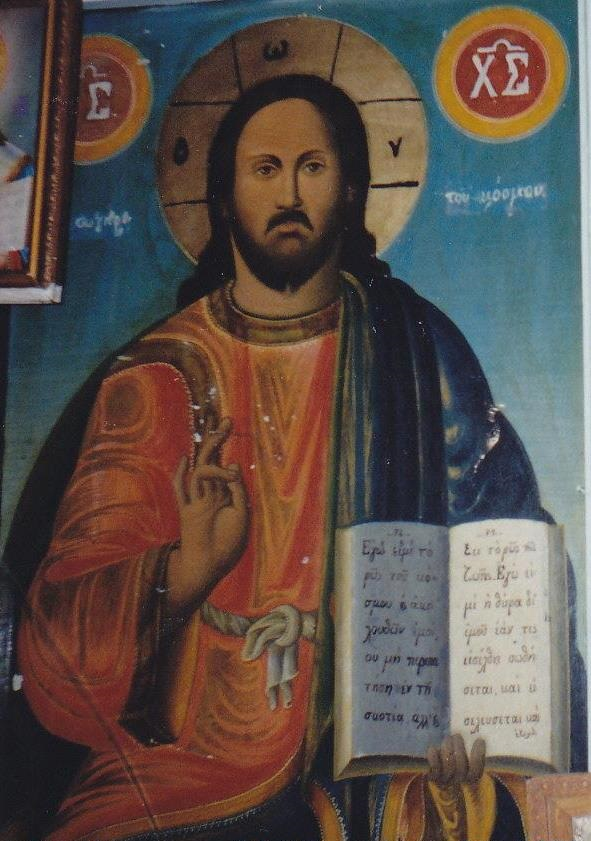
A Christ icon from Saint Arsenius Church in the village

Prasino (Greek: Πράσινο, before 1955: Τύρνοβον – Tyrnovon, Bulgarian: Търнава, Tarnava; Macedonian: Трново, Trnovo, also: Трнаа, Trnaa) is a village in Florina Regional Unit, Western Macedonia, Greece. The village has an altitude of 980 m (3,220 ft).

Prasino is located in the Korestia area and situated in mountainous terrain. The total land area of the village Prasino is 1,549 hectares, with the majority as forest, followed by use for agriculture and the remainder are grasslands. The architecture of Prasino consists of houses built from bricks. The modern village economy is based on agriculture.

A Christian village, the inhabitants were members of the Bulgarian Exarchate. During the Macedonian Struggle, Bulgarian and Greek bands were present in the village at various times. Immigrants from Tyrnovo in Toronto, Canada participated in the early Bulgarian community to build church infrastructure. Between 1912 and 1928, the village population was 400. Reliant on agricultural activities and some remittances from immigrants abroad, the average yearly family income of the village in the late interwar period was 10,700 drachmas. Prior to the onset of war the village population reached 500 people.

The population of Prasino was 376 in 1940. In the Greek Civil War, the village was occupied by the Democratic Army of Greece (DAG). Prasino suffered during the civil War, 8 inhabitants were killed, while the Greek military and Communist guerillas were present in the village at various times. Toward the end of the conflict, the majority of villagers fled to countries in Eastern Europe and later went to Canada and Australia. The population of Prasino, a Slavic Macedonian village was reduced by 66 percent due to the impacts of the Second World War and the civil war.

The inhabitants numbered 128 in 1951, 117 in 1961, 21 in 1981 and 21 in 2011. In the late 2010s, only one couple were the residents of Prasino. In the early 21st century Prasino is nearly abandoned. The modern village population is small and in decline.
