= Proti, Florina =

Village in Western Macedonia, Greece

Proti Πρώτη
- Community
- Location within Greece
- Coordinates: 40°48′58″N 21°23′46″E
- Country: Greece
- Administrative region: Western Macedonia
- Regional unit: Florina
- Municipality: Florina
- Municipal unit: Florina

Population (2021)
  - Community: 115
- Time zone: UTC+2 (EET)
  - Summer (DST): UTC+3 (EEST)

Proti (Greek: Πρώτη, before 1928: Καμπάσνιτσα – Kampasnitsa; Bulgarian/Macedonian: Кладошница, Kladošnica or Кабасница, Kabasnica) is a small village in the Florina regional unit of Macedonia, northern Greece, located approximately 5 kilometres (3.1 mi) northwest from the city of Florina, to which it belongs administratively.

== History ==

The village first appears in two chysobulls of the Serbian Tsar Stefan Dušan preserved in the archives of Treskavec monastery near Prilep. The documents, dated to 1343-44 and 1344–45, mention the village under its Aromanian name Klbasnicu in connection with a transhumant "route of the Vlachs," a toponym (vlaški pat) preserved today for a footpath following the crest of a hill to the west of the village. An Ottoman defter of 1481 records eighty households in the village.

In the book “Ethnographie des Vilayets d'Adrianople, de Monastir et de Salonique”, published in Constantinople in 1878, that reflects the statistics of the male population in 1873, Kladochnitza was noted as a village with 40 households and 110 male Bulgarian inhabitants. According to the statistics of geographer Dimitri Mishev (D. M. Brancoff), the village had a total Christian population of 520 in 1905, all Patriarchist Bulgarians (Grecomans). It also had 1 Greek school.

At one time a flourishing community of 500 people whose primary occupation was wheat farming, Proti today is an agricultural hamlet with 115 residents (2021 census).

There are a number of public buildings in the hamlet. The school, though unused, is in good condition. The church is impeccably maintained. In the rear of the church is the graveyard with many stones that are centuries old.

Proti was ravaged during World War II. Many residents left in the 1950s and 1960s in search of a better life and went to the U.S., Canada, and Australia.

== Demographics ==
In fieldwork done by anthropologist Riki Van Boeschoten in late 1993, Proti was populated by Slavophones. The Macedonian language was spoken in the village by people over 30 in public and private settings. Children understood the language, but mostly did not use it.

Historical population
Year	Pop.	±%
1913	637	—
1920	617	−3.1%
1928	802	+30.0%
1940	743	−7.4%
1951	303	−59.2%
1961	143	−52.8%
1971	137	−4.2%
1981	137	+0.0%
2001	105	−23.4%
2011	120	+14.3%
2021	115	−4.2%

== Notes ==
A house

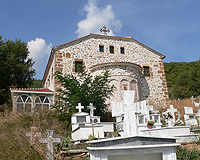
The cemetery

The church

The schoolhouse
