= Anastasia Karakasidou =

American scholar (born 1956)

- Born: Anastasia Karakasidou; September 7, 1956 (age 69); Thessalonica, Greece
- Education: Columbia University
- Occupations: Professor, scientist, anthropologist

Anastasia Karakasidou (Greek: Αναστασία Καρακασίδου) is an American scholar. Her expertise is archeology and anthropology. She is currently appointed as professor of Anthropology at the Wellesley College.

== Early life ==
Karakasidou was born on 7 September 1956 in Thessaloniki, Greece. Her father was a Karamanlides refugee from Cappadocia, and her mother was a native Greek from Thessaloniki.

== Career ==
In 1975, Anastasia Karakasidou began her studies in chemistry and later, in archeology and anthropology at Columbia University, United States. She participated in an ethno-archaeological study of the Langadas area at the Archaeological Department of Thessaloniki University. In 1992, she graduated from Columbia University, where she holds a Ph.D. and in 1993 she was active as a scholar at the Princeton University. She was also a lecturer in the State University of New York.

== Studies ==
Between 1990 and 1991, she conducted studies on the Slavic-speaking population in the area of Northern Greece with title: "Fields of Wheat, Hills of Blood. Passages to nationhood in Greek Macedonia, 1870 - 1970"., the publication of which were met with criticism in Greece, which at that period, was at odds with the neighboring Republic of Macedonia (now North Macedonia) due to the Macedonia naming dispute. Additionally, Karakasidou and her family received threats for their lives by nationalist Greek circles and was even warned by the British Secret Intelligence Service for her safety. Due to the negative reactions it received and fears for reprisal on the staff, its publication was cancelled by Cambridge University Press and was published by the University of Chicago instead. Outside the United States, the book was also published in 2002 in the then Republic of Macedonia and, in 2008, in Bulgaria. Her survey of the Florina region was published in 2002.
