= Filotas =

Village in Western Macedonia, Greece

Filotas Φιλώτας
- Municipal unit
- Location within the regional unit

- Location within Greece
- Coordinates: 40°38′N 21°42′E
- Country: Greece
- Administrative region: West Macedonia
- Regional unit: Florina
- Municipality: Amyntaio

Area
  - Municipal unit: 132.5 km^{2} (51.2 sq mi)

Population (2021)
  - Municipal unit: 3,616
  - Municipal unit density: 27.29/km^{2} (70.68/sq mi)
  - Community: 1,429
- Time zone: UTC+2 (EET)
  - Summer (DST): UTC+3 (EEST)
- Vehicle registration: ΡΑ

Filotas (Greek: Φιλώτας, before 1927: Τσαλτζιλάρ – Tsaltzilar; Bulgarian: Чалджиево, Chaldzhievo) is a village and a former municipality in Florina regional unit, West Macedonia, Greece. Since the 2011 local government reform it is a municipal unit of the municipality Amyntaio. The municipal unit has an area of 132.495 km^{2}. Population 3,616 (2021).

== Demographics ==
The 1920 Greek census recorded 2,137 people in the village, and 2,100 inhabitants were Muslim in 1923. Following the Greek–Turkish population exchange, Greek refugee families in Tsaltzilar were from East Thrace (393), Asia Minor (60) and the Caucasus (106) in 1926. The 1928 Greek census recorded 1,893 village inhabitants. In 1928, the refugee families numbered 539 (2,188 people).
