= Kato Kleines =

Kato Kleines Κάτω Κλεινές
- Municipal unit
- Location within the regional unit

- Location within Greece
- Coordinates: 40°51′N 21°25′E
- Country: Greece
- Administrative region: West Macedonia
- Regional unit: Florina
- Municipality: Florina

Area
  - Municipal unit: 188.6 km^{2} (72.8 sq mi)
- Elevation: 620 m (2,030 ft)

Population (2021)
  - Municipal unit: 2,132
  - Municipal unit density: 11.30/km^{2} (29.28/sq mi)
  - Community: 297
- Time zone: UTC+2 (EET)
  - Summer (DST): UTC+3 (EEST)
- Vehicle registration: ΡΑ

Kato Kleines (Greek: Κάτω Κλεινές, before 1926: Κάτω Κλέστινα - Kato Klestina; Bulgarian and Macedonian: Долно Клештино, Dolno Kleštino) is a village and a former municipality in Florina regional unit, West Macedonia, Greece. Since the 2011 local government reform it is part of the municipality Florina, of which it is a municipal unit. The municipal unit has an area of 188.564 km^{2}. It is 7 km north of the city of Florina. The population was 2,132 in 2021.

== History ==
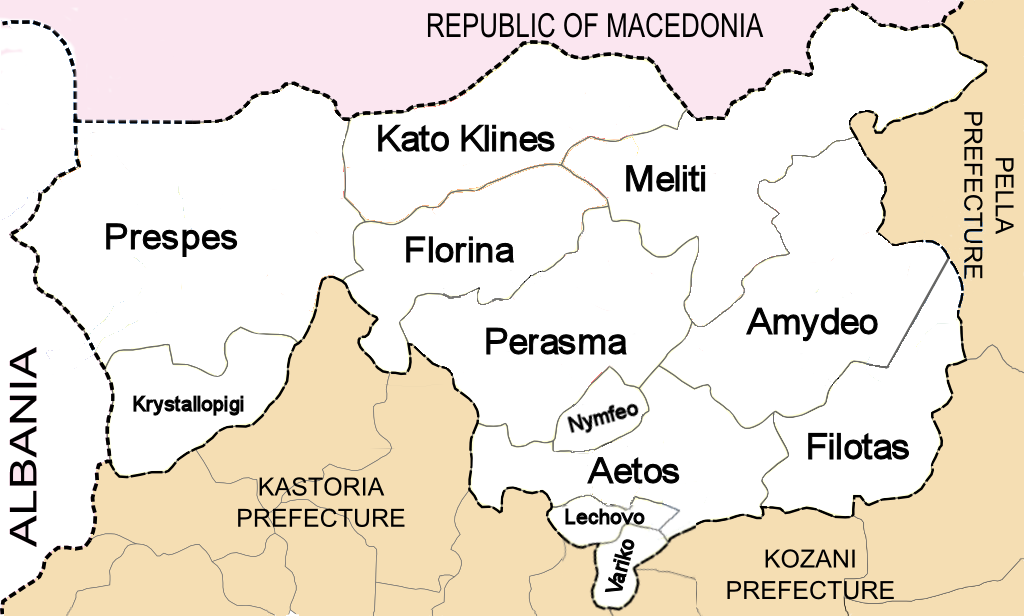
Map of Florina regional unit showing the former Kato Kleines municipality

The village was first mentioned in an Ottoman defter of 1468, where it is listed under the name of Kleshtino and described as having ninety-seven households. In 1481, the village possessed two hundred and thirteen households, a church, mills, and a kiln. The Turkish documents suggest a prosperous place, noting the production of vines, walnuts, onions, garlic, cabbage, peas, flax, honey, pigs, and silkworms.

In 1845 the Russian slavist Victor Grigorovich recorded Kleshtina (Клештина) as mainly Bulgarian village. Johann Georg von Hahn in his map from 1861 marked the village as Bulgarian, too. Besides Slav-speaking population there were 150 Albanians in Kato Kleines in the end of 19th century. According to the statistics of geographer Dimitri Mishev (D. M. Brancoff), the village had a total Christian population of 504 in 1905, all Patriarchist Bulgarians. It also had 1 Greek school.

Muslims of Kato Klestina were Albanian speakers. The 1920 Greek census recorded 792 people in the village, and 320 inhabitants (49 families) were Muslim in 1923. Following the Greek–Turkish population exchange, Greek refugee families in Kato Klestina were from East Thrace (2), Asia Minor (1) and the Caucasus (74) in 1926. The 1928 Greek census recorded 817 village inhabitants. In 1928, the refugee families numbered 77 (288 people).

Kato Kleines had 523 inhabitants in 1981. In fieldwork done by anthropologist Riki Van Boeschoten in late 1993, Kato Kleines was populated by a Greek population descended from Anatolian Greek refugees who arrived during the Greek-Turkish population exchange, and Slavophones. The Macedonian language was spoken in the village by people over 30 in public and private settings. Children understood the language, but mostly did not use it. Macedonian was spoken by people over 60, mainly in private.
