= Aetos, Florina =

Aetos Αετός
- Municipal unit
- Location within the regional unit

- Location within Greece
- Coordinates: 40°38′N 21°34′E
- Country: Greece
- Administrative region: Western Macedonia
- Regional unit: Florina
- Municipality: Amyntaio

Area
  - Municipal unit: 134.1 km^{2} (51.8 sq mi)

Population (2021)
  - Municipal unit: 2,239
  - Municipal unit density: 16.70/km^{2} (43.24/sq mi)
  - Community: 668
- Time zone: UTC+2 (EET)
  - Summer (DST): UTC+3 (EEST)
- Postal code: 530 73
- Vehicle registration: ΡΑ

Aetos (Greek: Αετός, also: Αϊτόζι, Aitozi; Bulgarian: Айтос, Aytos; Macedonian: Ајтос, Ajtos) is a village and a former municipality in Florina regional unit, Western Macedonia, Greece. Since the 2011 local government reform it is part of the municipality Amyntaio, of which it is a municipal unit. The municipal unit has an area of 134.092 km^{2}. It is 18 km southeast of Florina. In 2021 it had a population of 2,239.

The Greek name of the village Aetos is an animal based toponym derived from local wildlife present in the wider region. The village has 4 churches dedicated each to either St. George, St. Paraskevi, St. Athanasius or the Archangel Michael. A bear sanctuary is located nearby in the forest above the village for rescued (dancing) bears held in captivity. The village celebrates the cultivation of local peppers with an annual Festival of Peppers held on September.

The village originates in the 15th century. It is first mentioned in an Ottoman defter of 1481, where it is described as a settlement of fifty-nine households which produced vines and walnuts. In statistics gathered by Vasil Kanchov in 1900, Aetos was populated by 950 Christian Bulgarians and 60 Romani. In the aftermath of the Ilinden Uprising (1903) the Ottomans persecuted Exarchists. In Aetos, villagers such as Orthodox notable Nikolaos Vannis and the priest Papa Alexis conspired with Ottoman authorities to trap and arrest the komitadji Aleksandar Turundzhev, a figure hostile to the Patriarchist cause. In 1912, the village had 740 Exarchists and 60 Romani Patriarchists. Several families from Aetos immigrated to Bulgaria following the post First World War Treaty of Neuilly. The village had 920 inhabitants in 1928.

Macedonian is spoken in Aetos. In the late 1990s, the youth of Aetos had an impact on language shift within the home as they would alternate between two languages Greek and Slavic in the context of conversations (code-switching) with the elderly. Academic Pierre Sintes was in the Florina area doing research in the early 2010s. Sintes wrote Aetos was populated by Dopioi, (meaning locals or natives) a Greek term used for Slavophones of the region.
