= Perasma =

Perasma Πέρασμα
- Municipal unit
- Location within the regional unit

- Location within Greece
- Coordinates: 40°45′N 21°28′E
- Country: Greece
- Administrative region: West Macedonia
- Regional unit: Florina
- Municipality: Florina

Area
  - Municipal unit: 211.0 km^{2} (81.5 sq mi)
- Elevation: 660 m (2,170 ft)

Population (2021)
  - Municipal unit: 3,478
  - Municipal unit density: 16.48/km^{2} (42.69/sq mi)
  - Community: 358
- Time zone: UTC+2 (EET)
  - Summer (DST): UTC+3 (EEST)
- Vehicle registration: ΡΑ

Perasma (Greek: Πέρασμα, before 1926: Κουτσκοβαίνη – Koutskovaini; Bulgarian and Macedonian Slavic: Кучковени, Kučkoveni) is a village and a former municipality in Florina regional unit, West Macedonia, Greece. Since the 2011 local government reform it is part of the municipality Florina, of which it is a municipal unit. The municipal unit has an area of 211.023 km^{2}. It is located in a plain, 6 km southeast of Florina. The population was 3,478 in 2021.

== Name ==
Before the change of name in 1926, the village was locally known as Kučkoveni. Before then, it was known as Kruševo or Blizna Kruša. The reason for this name was because the village flourished with vegetation, specifically Pears (which translates to Kruša in the Slavic dialect). During the Byzantine era, the village was called Tumbata (meaning on a hill - where the village was situated at the time). Before Tumbata, it was called Kitutsi (for unknown reasons, possibly of Latin or Ancient Greek origin). The name Kučkoveni/Kuchkoveni has said to come about during the 15th century. Kučko in the local Slavic dialect means female dog, which depicts an old tale that has been passed down from the ancestors of the region.

Originally, there was a church that was situated just north of the initial village. During this time, the locals believed that their town and people were under a so-called curse which resulted with many dying, and with the reason unknown. One day, a female dog ironically ran past the village's church and had ten little pups, all of whom were extremely healthy and were nurtured by their mother. A male villager who was making his way to hunt rabbits over the hills saw the little puppies nestling peacefully. The man was astonished by what he had seen, which was perhaps a sign of healthy life, so went back to the main village in order to inform the others. Once the locals heard, they finally believed that the area was truly blessed by their great monastery. So, as time went on, they finally decided to burn down the original village and create a new one north of the church. From then on, this plague which killed nearly everything in the region stopped and the population overall grew miraculously.

The new Greek name for the village, Perasma, directly translates to pathway. In some other historical documents, the name in Greek has also been Skylochori meaning dog village.

== History ==
The settlement was first mentioned in an Ottoman defter of 1481, under the name of Kučkovjani, and was described as having sixty-seven households. The locals of the village produced many freshly-grown crops that were kept or sold in the Florinian markets, like garlic and onions.

The village had approximately 100,000 kg of wheat, 150,000 kg of corn and 25,000 kg of rye at one point in time. The houses were said to have been made from hay and soil, which as a result created a type of brick.

During the times of the Ottoman Empire, Perasma was under the Church Dioscese of Kastoria, which was also when their main monastery, Agioi Anargyroi, was built in 1300 before the Ottoman invasion. In 1845 the Russian slavist Victor Grigorovich recorded Kuchkovini (Кучковини) as mainly Bulgarian village.

During the 17th and early 18th centuries, the village was Orthodox and refused to fall under the Muslim supremacy of the Turks. The first school of the village taught the Greek language to the pupils, and included the following teachers: A. Kousmanis from the village of Skopia, G. Konstantinidis, K. Gitskalis, P. Klekatsis, G. Papadimitriou and Papanousis from Drosopigi. As a result of the rise of Bulgarian nationalism in Macedonia the village created such revolutionary figures as Koche Deloff - the Florina leader of the Bulgarian Macedonian Revolutionary Organization, who was killed by the Young Turks near the villages of Flambouro and Drosopigi. According to the Bulgarian council in Monastir, Andrey Toshev, the population of the village (46 houses) became under the supremacy of the Bulgarian Exarchate in 1902. The "La Macédoine et sa Population Chrétienne" survey by Dimitar Mishev concluded that the Christian population in 1905 was composed of 760 Bulgarian Exarchists.

During the Nazi occupation of Greece in World War II, the Germans placed a Bulgarian council in Perasma, which consisted of local people from the village such as Kosta Nedelkoff, Todor Popdimitroff, Nase Gagapoff, Iliya Popstoyanoff, Dimitriya Kincharoff, Pandel Gichkaloff, Nikola Popstoyanoff, Iliya Pirganoff and Boris Nedelkoff. Once the Axis powers lost their complete control over the Greek region, many of these men were sentenced to years in prison - some were sent as far as Gyaros Island in the Aegean Sea. The history mentions a range of killings and thievery by German troops who entered the village during the middle 1940s. Once the Greek Civil War erupted post WWII, most Perasmiotes sided with the communist parties - KKE and/or NOF. In 1948, 300 men from Perasma were sentenced to prison by the Greek government for being former "collaborators with the Bulgarian Ohrana troops during WWII". When the Civil War was won by the royal army of Greece, many villagers were forced to flee the village and move elsewhere past the borders. The majority of them settled in Yugoslavia, but some in Poland, and even Russia.

=== Immigration ===
During and after the Greek Civil War, many villagers were exiled to communist countries (Yugoslavia, Poland and even Russia). Others immigrated to nations with much more security and wealth to offer - Australia, Canada and United States. The people still found many ways to keep their community alive and together, by setting up various clubs around the different cities. The Kouchkovski Social Club, Melbourne Australia is one of the most well-known groups around today, having commenced in the 1950s. These clubs are aimed at increasing health and well-being by participating in community activities and various programs. The name of Melbourne's club is not without contention among the Perasma community of Melbourne, as it fails to reflect both the Greek and distinct Slavic - Macedonian heritage of the villagers; many feel a more appropriate name may be the "Perasma-Kouchkoini Social Club of Melbourne, Australia" and in large part this fact (among others) is the reason for the largely aging and declining membership of the club as of today. (Also witness the practical absence of any Melbourne born Perasma origin second or third generation members).

Pre–war and post–war immigration from Perasma led to the formation of a diaspora and most of the village population lives abroad in the northern suburbs of Melbourne in Australia.

== Demographics ==
Perasma had 534 inhabitants in 1981. In fieldwork done by anthropologist Riki Van Boeschoten in late 1993, Perasma was populated by Slavophones. The Macedonian language was used by people of all ages, both in public and private settings, and as the main language for interpersonal relationships. Some elderly villagers had little knowledge of Greek.
