= Florina (regional unit) =

Florina Περιφερειακή ενότητα Φλώρινας
- Regional unit
- Municipalities of Florina

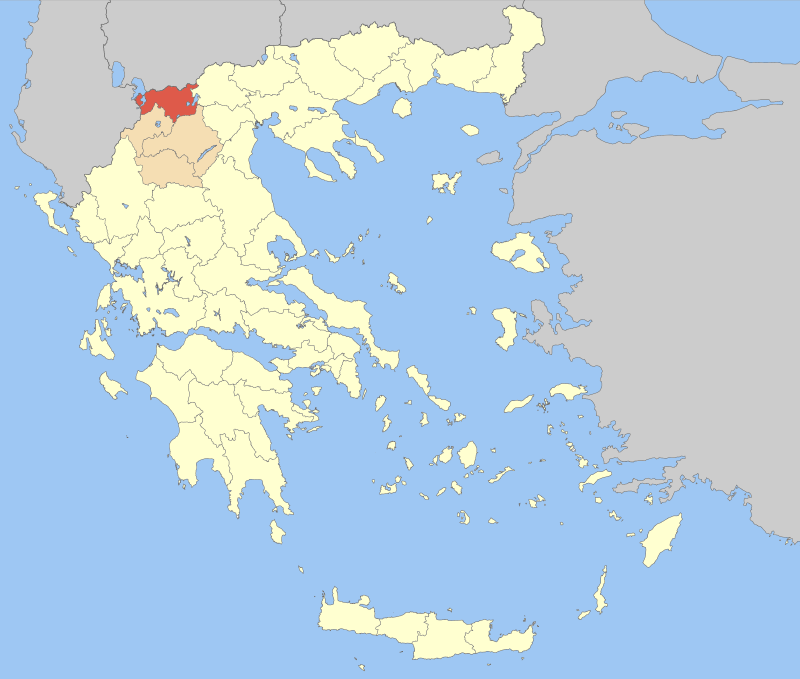
- Florina within Greece

- Location within Greece
- Coordinates: 40°45′N 21°25′E
- Country: Greece
- Geographic region: Macedonia
- Administrative region: Western Macedonia
- Seat: Florina

Area
  - Total: 1,924 km^{2} (743 sq mi)

Population (2021)
  - Total: 44,880
  - Density: 23.33/km^{2} (60.42/sq mi)
- Time zone: UTC+2 (EET)
  - Summer (DST): UTC+3 (EEST)
- Postal code: 53x xx
- Area code: 238x0, 246x0
- Vehicle registration: ΡΑ
- Website: www.florina.gr

Florina (Greek: Περιφερειακή Ενότητα Φλώρινας, Perifereiakí Enótita Flórinas) is one of the regional units of Greece. It is part of the region of Western Macedonia, in the geographic region of Macedonia. Its capital is the town of Florina. The total population is around 45,000 (2021).

== Geography ==
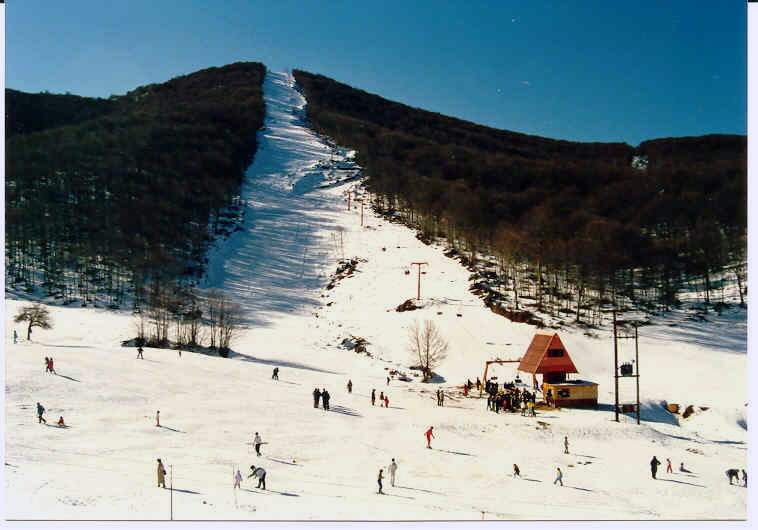
Pisoderi ski resort

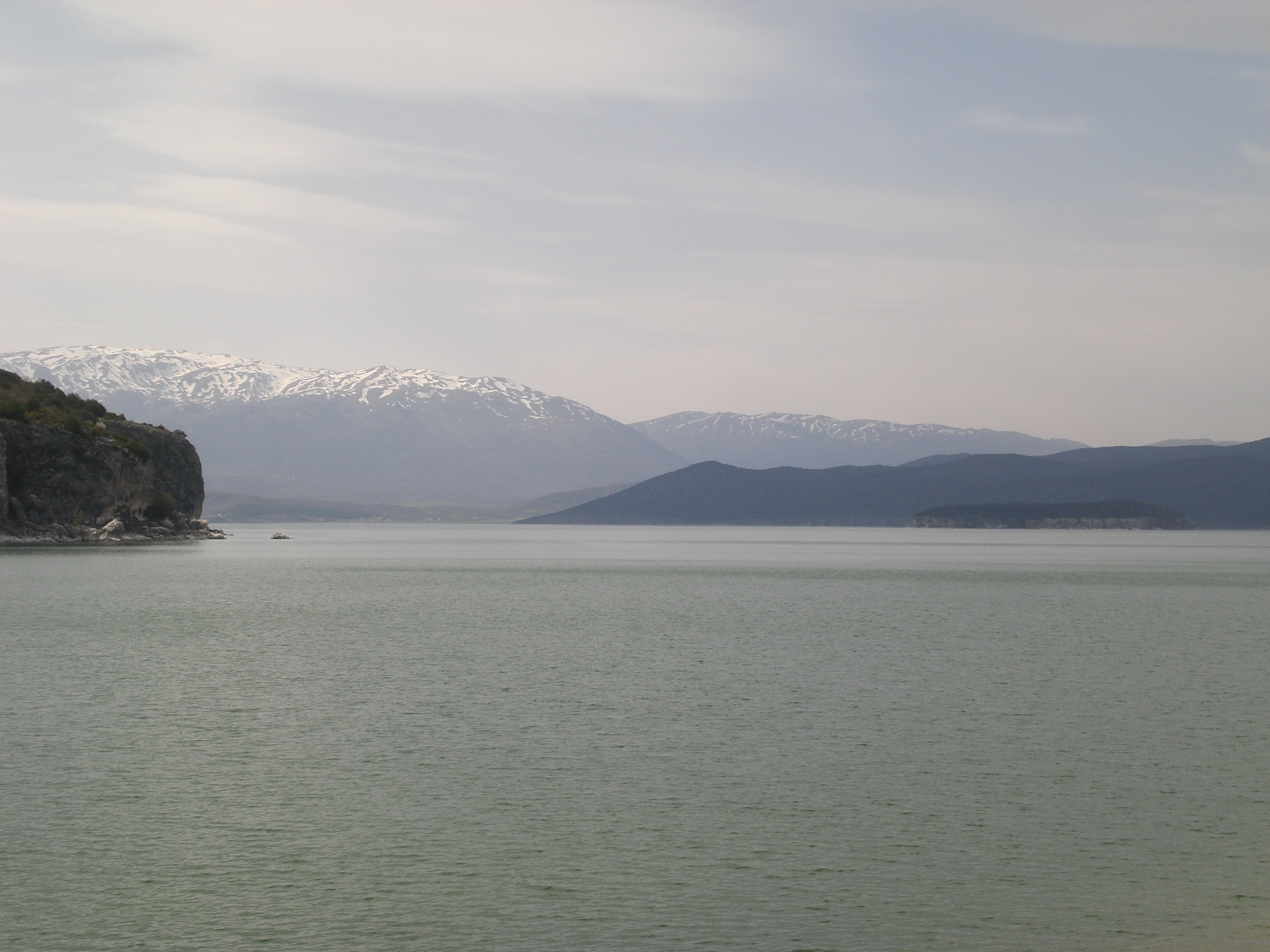
Lake Prespa

Florina borders the regional units of Pella to the east, Kozani to the south and Kastoriá to the southwest. At the Greek international borders, it is adjacent to Albania (Korçë County) to the west, North Macedonia (Bitola and Resen municipalities) to the north and Lake Prespa to the northwest, where the two borders cross each other. Lake Vegoritida is situated in the east.

Mountains in the regional unit include Verno (2,128 m or 6,982 ft), Varnous (2,117 m or 6,946 ft) and Voras (2,524 m or 8,281 ft).

== Administration ==
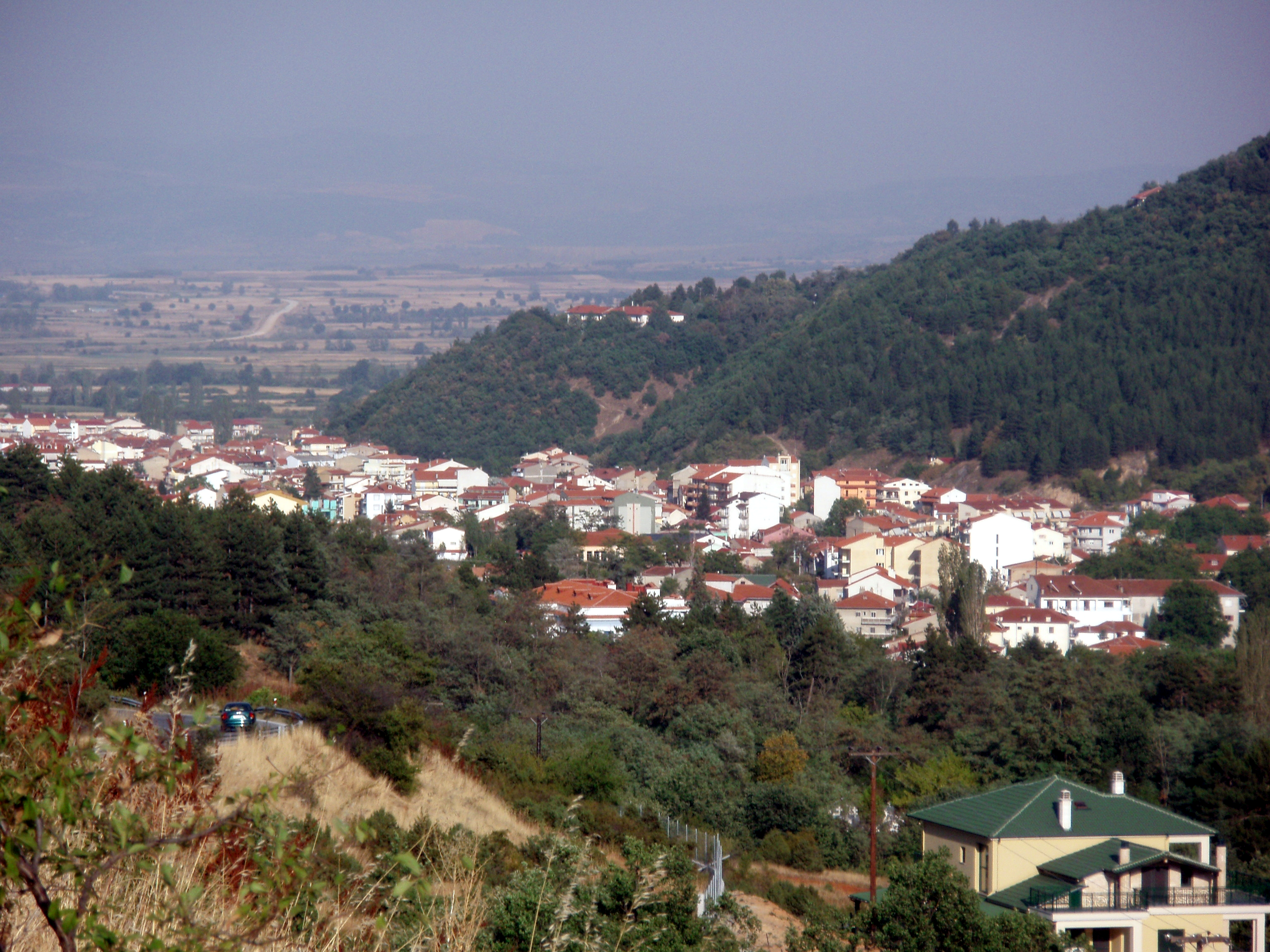
Florina

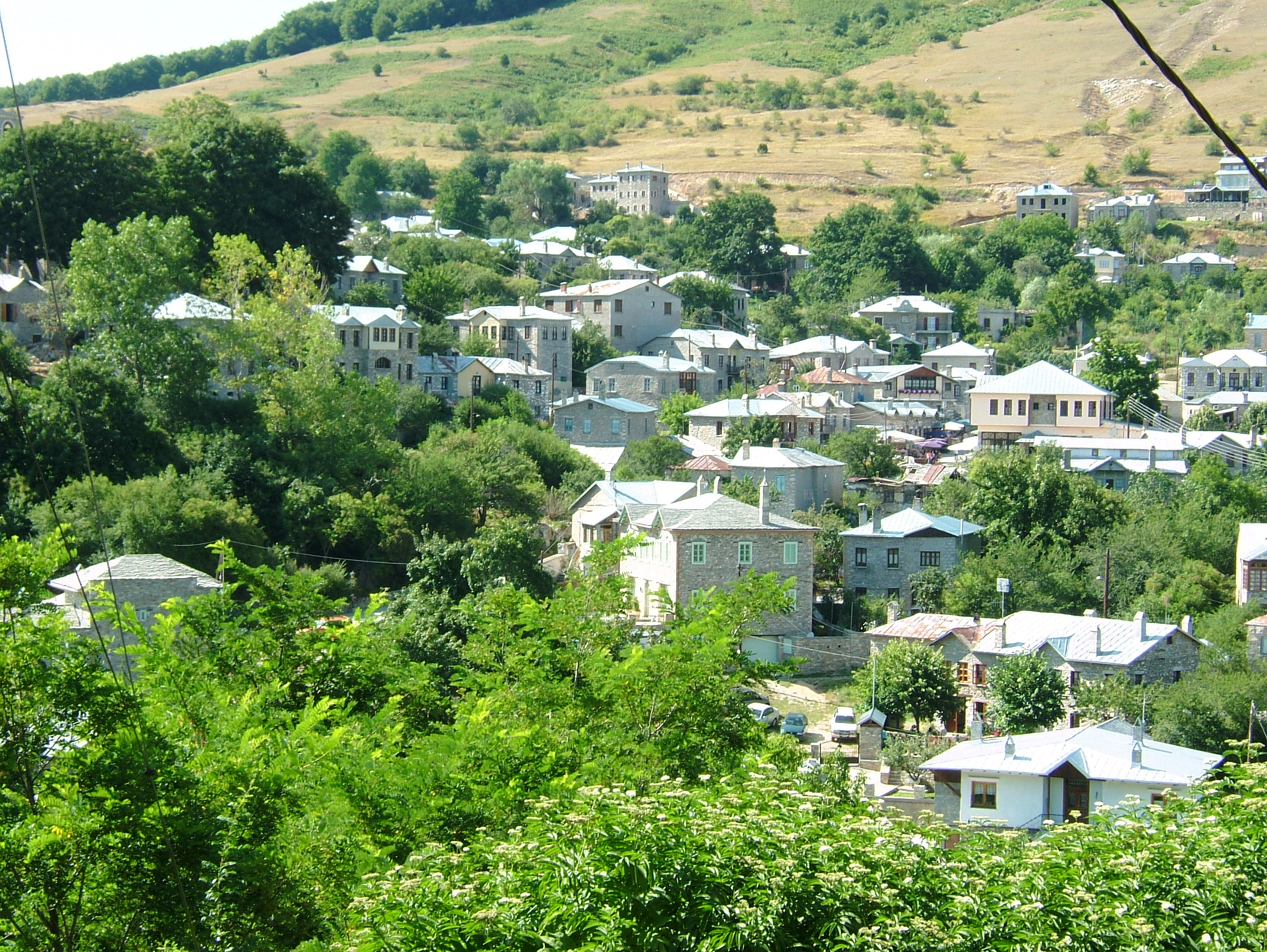
Nymfaio

As from 2011 the regional unit of Florina is subdivided into three municipalities. These are (number as in the map in the infobox):

- Amyntaio (2)
- Florina (1)
- Prespes (3)

=== Prefecture ===
Florina was created as a prefecture (Greek: Νομός Φλώρινας, Nomós Flórinas) in 1915. As a part of the 2011 Kallikratis government reform, the regional unit Florina was created out of the former prefecture Florina. The prefecture had the same territory as the present regional unit. At the same time, the municipalities were reorganised, according to the table below.

New municipality	Old municipalities	Seat
Amyntaio	Amyntaio	Amyntaio
Amyntaio	Aetos	Amyntaio
Amyntaio	Variko	Amyntaio
Amyntaio	Lechovo	Amyntaio
Amyntaio	Nymfaio	Amyntaio
Amyntaio	Filotas	Amyntaio
Florina	Florina	Florina
Florina	Kato Kleines	Florina
Florina	Meliti	Florina
Florina	Perasma	Florina
Prespes	Prespes	Laimos
Prespes	Krystallopigi	Laimos

== Demographics ==
The demographic composition of the area the 19th and early 20th centuries is unclear as many factors contributed to the ethnic orientation of the people; out of these religion was particularly important thus giving rise to a proselytism struggle between the Greek Ecumenical Patriarchate of Constantinople and the Bulgarian Exarchate (established in 1870). In 1886, 78.4% of the Christian population of the Florina kaza (district) - a part of Manastir Vilayet (province) - was aligned with the Ecumenical Patriarchate and 21.6% with the Bulgarian Exarchate, however by 1900 the Patriarchatists had dropped to 50.9% and Exarchatists had risen to 49.1%. In 1914 the majority of the Christian population of the Florina district was recorded as Exarchist Bulgarian (59%), 70% of whom were monolingual in Bulgarian only.

The 1920s was a period of migration, displacement, deportation and a voluntary exchange of populations between Greece and Bulgaria, during which the Greek government aimed to remove Slavic-speakers with fanatic Bulgarian sentiments from Greek Macedonia. In 1925, according to the Prefect of Florina 52% of the population were schismatics (up from about 20% in 1886), 25% were Patriarchists, 15% were refugees, 6% were Vlachs (Aromanians) and 3% were indigenous Greeks. According to government sources, in 1925 there were 45,527 Slav speakers, of whom 34,234 former Exarchists and 11,293 former Patriarchists; 7449 Greek refugees; 3590 Vlachs (Aromanians); 1882 indigenous Greeks; 349 Jews and 27 Muslim Albanians. According to Kollopoulos in 1925 the recorded Slav Macedonians were 64,465 and constituted 64% of the population of the district of Florina, of whom 28,673 were schismatic. The 1928 census showed 38,562 Slavic speakers in the nome of Florina or 31% of the population, but according to contemporary Greek authors the numbers of this census "clearly" do not reflect the actual strength of the minority as a result of official policy and Greek government of reluctance. According to the Prefect of Florina, P. Kalligas, in 1930 there were 76,370 (61%), of whom 61,950 (49% of the population) lacked Greek consciousness, while his successor V. Balkos estimates those speaking Bulgarian as 75-80% of the population of the nome in 1931. According to the Prefect of Florina, in 1935 of 11,683 families 56% had Slavic national consciousness, while 41.3% were "foreign speakers" with Greek national consciousness.

The local Greek population includes a linguistic minority of bilingual Slavophones, who in the early 1990s formed about 64% of the rural population and about 16% of the prefecture's total population." Anastasia Karakasidou estimated that 80% of the population of Florina Prefecture is either Slavic-speaking or descended from Slavic-speaking families. There also exist smaller communities of Aromanians and Arvanites, which today mostly have an ethnic Greek identity.

A diverse range of dialects are spoken in the regional unit alongside the official standard and local Macedonian varieties of Greek. A minority of people speak the local ethnic Macedonian dialects and especially the Lower Prespa dialect and the Prilep-Bitola dialect.

According to the 2021 census, the population of Florina regional unit was 44,880 people. In the 2009 European elections in Greece, 1,195 people from Florina Prefecture voted for the Rainbow Party.

== Agriculture ==
Florina is rich in agriculture. The main production are peppers, beans and peaches. Beans are produced near Lake Prespa.

== Transport ==
The Thessaloniki–Bitola railway passes through the regional unit, but passenger trains (two per day in each direction) currently only serve part of the line between Arnissa and Florina: the Kozani–Amyntaio railway is currently out of use, due to lignite mining around Ptolemaida.

Two E-roads – the E65 (consisting of the northern segment of the A27 motorway and the Ptolemaida–Florina National Road), and the E86 (mostly the EO2 and the Arnissa–Antigonos national roads) – pass through the unit: the A29 briefly passes through to the south west, near Krystallopigi. Other main roads in the unit include the EO3 and the EO15.

== See also ==
- List of settlements in the Florina regional unit
- Archaeological Museum of Florina
- Florina Byzantine Museum
- Florina Museum of Modern Art
- Pisoderi ski resort
