= List of former toponyms in Florina Prefecture =

Many inhabited places in Florina Prefecture of Greece have both Slavic and Greek forms. Some of the forms are identifiably of Greek origin, others of Slavic, yet others of Turkish or more obscure origins.

Former name(s)	Current official name other Greek names	Geographic Coordinates	Citation	Population (2011)	Comments
Banitsa (Баница)	Vevi (Βεύη)	40°46′N 21°37′E		663	
Boreshnitsa (Борешница)	Palaistra (Παλαίστρα)	40°48.20′N 21°31′E		289	
Vrbeni (Врбени, Върбени)	Itea (Ιτέα)	40°50.10′N 21°30.80′E		542	
Armensko (Арменско)	Alona (Άλωνα)	40°46.37′N 21°18.10′E		211	
Zhelevo (Желево)	Antartiko (Ανταρτικό)	40°45.30′N 21°12.24′E		84	
Rakovo (Раково)	Kratero (Κρατερό)	40°51.23′N 21°18.45′E		84	
Neret (Нерет)	Polipotamo (Πολυπόταμο)	40°43.03′N 21°21.59′E		314	
Dolno Kotori (Долно Котори)	Ydroussa (Υδρούσσα)	40°43.23′N 21°27.34′E		304	
Dolno Kleštino (Долно Клештино)	Kato Kleines (Κάτω Κλεινές)	40°50.57′N 21°23.51′E		394	
Buf (Буф)	Akritas (Ακρίτας)	40°48.56′N 21°18.08′E		100	
Zabardeni (Забрдени, Забърдени)	Lofoi (Λόφοι)	40°47.70′N 21°35.25′E		355	
Krushoradi (Крушоради)	Achlada (Αχλάδα)	40°51.68′N 21°36.80′E		404	
Kuchkoveni (Кучковени)	Perasma (Πέρασμα)	40°45′N 21°28′E		435	
Mokreni (Мокрени)	Variko (Βαρικό)	40°32′N 21°30′E		638	
Neveska (Невеска)	Nymfaio (Νυμφαίο)	40°38.38′N 21°29.37′E		132	
Negochani (Негочани)	Niki (Νίκη)	40°54.31′N 21°25.14′E		273	
Neokazi (Неокази)	Neochoraki (Νεοχωράκι)	40°49.59′N 21°32.59′E		518	
Ovcharani, Voshtarani (Овчарани, Вощарани)	Meliti (Μελίτη)	40°49.80′N 21°34.88′E		1,432	
Petorak, Petoritsa (Петорак, Петорица)	Tripotamos (Τριπόταμος)	40°49.59′N 21°30′E		311	
Sveta Petka (Света Петка)	Agia Paraskevi (Αγία Παρασκευή)	40°53′N 21°23′E		136	both Greek and Slavic names mean "Saint Paraskevi"
Setina (Сетина)	Skopos (Σκοπός)	40°52′N 21°37.59′E		114	both Greek and Slavic names mean "sentinel"
Smardesh (Смрдеш, Смърдеш)	Krystallopigi (Κρυσταλλοπηγή)	40°38′N 21°05′E		359	
Armenovo (Арменово)	Armenochori (Αρμενοχώρι)	40°48′N 21°28′E		986	
Sorovich (Сорович, Суровичево)	Amyntaio (Αμύνταιο)	40°41.23′N 21°40.45′E		4,306	
Popozani (Пополжани)	Papagiannis (Παπαγιάννης)	40°50′N 21°29′E		581	
Bitusha (Битуша)	Paroreio (Παρόρειο)	40°52′N 21°22′E		23	
Nivitsi (Нивици)	Psarades (Ψαράδες)	40°49′N 21°1.9′E		83	
Rosna (Росна)	Sitaria (Σιταριά)	40°47′N 21°32′E		718	
