= Battle of Sorovich =

Battle fought in the First Balkan War

Coordinates: 40.41°N 21.41°E

- Part of the First Balkan War
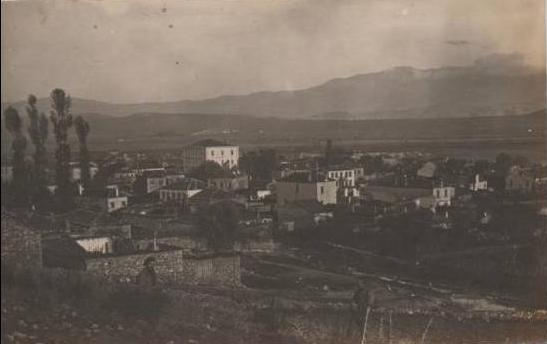
- Panorama of Ekshi Su (Xino Nero) c. 1916
Date	2–6 November [O.S. 21–24 October] 1912
Location	Sorovich, Monastir Vilayet, Ottoman Empire (now Amyntaio, Greece)
Result	Ottoman victory

Belligerents
(Kingdom of Greece) Greece	Ottoman Empire

Commanders and leaders
(Greece) Dimitrios Matthaiopoulos	(Ottoman Empire) Hasan Rıza Pasha

Units involved
5th Infantry Division	16th Infantry Division; 17th Infantry Division; 18th Infantry Division

Strength
7,080	20,000

Casualties and losses
211 killed 320 wounded 22 missing in action 10 captured	Unknown
- Location of the battle in present day Greece

The Battle of Sorovich (Greek: Μάχη του Σόροβιτς, Turkish: Soroviç Muharebesi) took place between 21–24 October 1912 (O.S.). It was fought between Greek and Ottoman forces during the First Balkan War, and revolved around the Sorovich (Amyntaio) area. The 5th Greek Division which had been advancing through western Macedonia separately from the bulk of the Greek Army of Thessaly, was attacked outside the village of Zabardeni (Lofoi) and fell back to Sorovich. It found itself to be heavily outnumbered by an opposing Ottoman force.

After withstanding repeated attacks between 22 and 23 October, the division was routed on the early morning of 24 October after Ottoman machine gunners struck its flank in an early morning surprise attack. The Greek defeat at Sorovich resulted in the Serbian capture of the contested city of Monastir (Bitola).

== Background ==
The disastrous Greek defeat in the Greco-Turkish War of 1897 exposed major flaws in the Hellenic Army's organization, training and logistics. Georgios Theotokis was the first post-war Greek prime minister to focus his attention on strengthening the army. He established the National Defense Fund which financed the purchase of large quantities of ammunition. In addition a new table of organization was introduced for the country's navy and army, the latter being augmented by numerous artillery batteries. Theotokis' resignation in January 1909 and the perceived neglect of the armed forces by his successor resulted in the Goudi coup seven months later. Rather than taking power for themselves, the putschists invited Cretan politician Eleftherios Venizelos to rule the country. Venizelos followed in Theotokis' footsteps by re-arming and re-training the military, including extensive fortification and infrastructure works, purchase of new weapons, and the recall of reserve classes for training. The climax of this effort was the invitation in 1911 of a British naval mission and a French military mission.

After being informed of a Serbo-Bulgarian alliance, Venizelos ordered his ambassador in Sofia to prepare a Greco-Bulgarian defense agreement by 14 April 1912, fearing that should Greece fail to participate in a future war against the Ottomans, it would be unable to capture the Greek majority areas of Macedonia. The treaty was signed on 15 July 1912, with the two countries agreeing to assist each other in case of a defensive war and to safeguard the rights of Christian populations in Ottoman held Macedonia, thus joining the loose Balkan League alliance with Serbia, Montenegro and Bulgaria. Fearing a new war in the Balkans, the Ottomans declared mobilization on 14 September and began transferring units to Thrace; the Balkan League responded in kind. On 30 September, the League presented the Ottomans with a list of demands regarding the rights of its Christian population. The Ottoman Empire rebuffed the demands, recalled its ambassadors in Sofia, Belgrade and Athens and expelled the League's negotiators on 4 October, with the League declaring war against the Ottomans. Montenegro had already begun military operations on 25 September.

== Prelude ==
The Army of Thessaly crossed into Ottoman territory in the early morning hours of 5 October, finding most border posts to be abandoned. The first major clashes took place the following day when the 1st and 2nd Greek Divisions attacked Elassona, resulting in an Ottoman withdrawal towards Sarantaporo. At 7 a.m. on 9 October, the Greek infantry opened the Battle of Sarantaporo. The 1st, 2nd and 3rd Divisions attacked the Ottoman main line frontally. In the meantime, the cavalry brigade, 4th and 5th Divisions conducted a flanking maneuver from the west with the intention of striking the rear of the Ottoman positions. Despite the position being perceived as impregnable by its defenders, the main body of the Greek forces managed to advance deep inside the pass, while auxiliary units broke through the Ottoman flanks. The Ottomans abandoned their defensive line during the night, fearing encirclement.

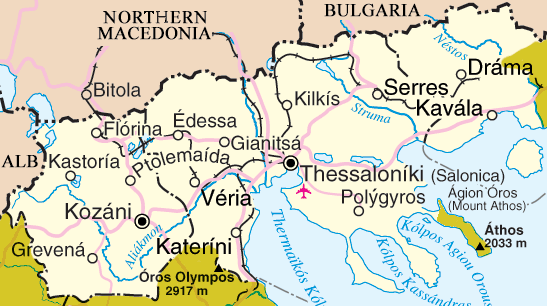
A map of the modern Greek region of Macedonia

At 4 p.m. on 10 October, the 4th Division marched into Servia, while the Greek cavalry entered Kozani unopposed the following day. After their defeat at Sarantaporo, the Ottomans augmented the remnants of Hasan Tahsin Pasha's force with fresh reinforcements and organized their main defensive line at Yenidje (Giannitsa). On 18 October, Crown Prince Constantine ordered the bulk of the Army of Thessaly to head towards Yenidje despite receiving conflicting intelligence reports regarding the disposition of the enemy troops. In the meantime, the 5th Greek Division under Dimitrios Matthaiopoulos, continued its advance across western Macedonia, aiming to reach the Kailar (Ptolemaida)-Nalbantköy (Perdikkas) area, where it was to await further orders. There, the division would either unite with the rest of the Army of Thessaly or capture Monastir (Bitola). After crossing the Kirli Derven pass, it reached Banitsa (Vevi) on 19 October.

The 5th Greek Division continued its march through the Florina plain on 19 October, halting temporarily north of Kirli Derven after learning that the Ottomans were massing their troops at Florina, Armenochori and Neokazi (Neochoraki). The following day a Greek advanced guard repulsed an attack by a small Ottoman unit at Negovan (Flampouro). On 21 October, Matthaiopoulos ordered an advance towards Monastir after being informed that it was guarded by a small demoralized garrison. This decision was further encouraged by the Serbian victory at Prilep and the Greek victory at Yenidje.

== Battle ==
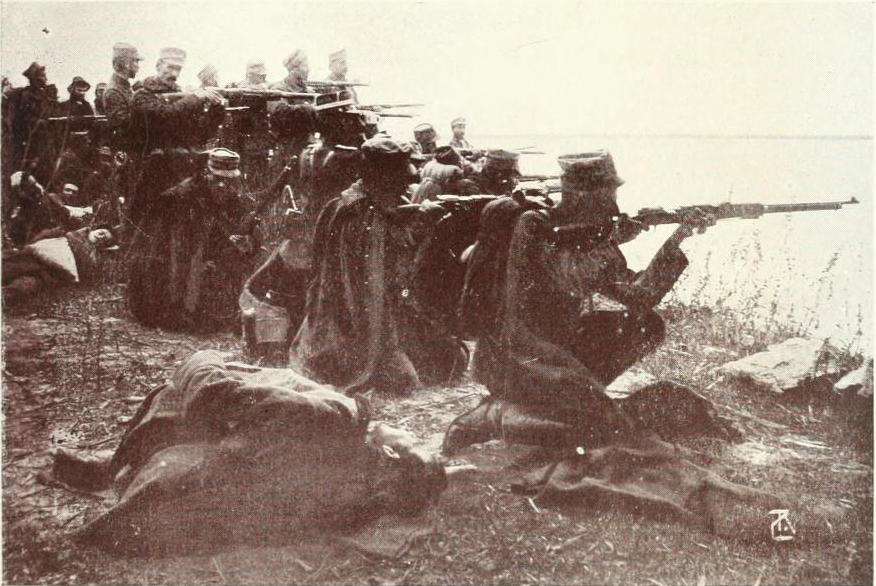
Greek soldiers at the battle of Yenidje

At 10:30 a.m. 21 October, the 5th Division which had split into three columns set off for Monastir. Almost immediately the Greek right column halted its advance and took up defensive positions north of the village of Zabardeni. At 11 a.m., it was attacked by the 18th Ottoman Infantry Division which had been brought to the area by rail from Monastir. Although the Serbians were aware of this maneuver, they only allocated a limited a number of troops to strike the Ottoman rear, as they intended to seize Monastir first.

The Greek right column initially showed determined resistance but struggled to defend Zabardeni and its soldiers fled the field towards Vevi after realizing that it was about to be encircled. The Greek attempt to strike the Ottoman flanks at Zabardeni and the Banitsa railway station failed to achieve its objective. Seeing that his troops were exhausted and exposed to Ottoman fire on the plain, Matthaiopoulos ordered a retreat towards Sorovich at 6:00 p.m. After passing through the Kirli Derven Pass, the 5th Division camped at Sorovich next to the Petres Lake. Matthaiopoulos placed his 7,000 infantrymen north-east of the town, the 20 artillery pieces were stationed in the Sotiras village, while 80 cavalry were to protect the western flank of the division at Gioulentsi (Rodonas).

At 8:00 a.m. 22 October, the 18th Ottoman Infantry Division split into two columns, one of which attacked Sorovich from the direction of Ekshi Sou (Xino Nero). The Ottoman charge was suppressed by Greek artillery fire, leading to an artillery duel that lasted for the remainder of the day. A second Ottoman offensive from Petersko (Petres) was successfully repulsed during the night. Unbeknownst to the Greeks, the 18th Ottoman Infantry Division which already outnumbered them was reinforced by the 16th and 17th Ottoman Infantry Divisions bringing the total number of the Ottomans to 20,000 men.

On 23 October, the Greeks launched reconnaissance forays which found that Ekshi Sou was devoid of enemy troops. The Ottomans launched a series of large scale attacks on the Greek center and eastern flank. The 5th Division held its ground, counter-attacking at 3:00 p.m., two Greek Regiments struck the Ottoman center, while another one attacked the western Ottoman flank in the village of Petersko. The Greeks drove a wedge between the Ottoman center and western flank. This caused the Ottomans to flee towards Kirli Derven Pass without offering much resistance. The Greeks did not pursue their adversaries, the 22nd Greek Regiment's right flank was fired upon at night leading to a disorganized retreat to the nearby railway line and road junction. The 5th Division was also augmented by its rearguard, 3 infantry companies and 3 engineering companies. The Ottomans who had just been defeated at the Battle of Prilep, withdrew most of their troops at Sorovich to Monastir in an effort to halt the Serbian drive towards the city. In the meantime, the Greek Ministry of Military Affairs dispatched a telegram to the Serbian government urging for greater pressure to be exerted on Monastir, in order to relieve the 5th Greek Division.

Shortly before the dawn of 24 October, a company belonging to the 17th Ottoman Division armed with several machine guns approached the Greek western flank from the direction of the village of Spantsa (Fanos). Guided by local civilians it remained undetected by Greek sentries. At 6:30 a.m., it opened fire on the Greek positions at Spantsa while the defenders were still asleep. This caused panic to spread from the engineer company that was first attacked to other units, who abandoned their equipment and fled the area. The Ottomans advancing from Ekshi Sou and Kirli Derven Pass penetrated the Greek lines, capturing an artillery battery and signalling another Ottoman unit to attack from the east. The soldiers guarding the Greek eastern flank offered stubborn resistance, refusing to yield until given a written order. The Greek eastern flank was eventually overpowered, while many Greek soldiers were killed by Ottoman riflemen and sympathetic civilians. By 10:00 a.m., the main body of the Greek force had been routed, fleeing towards Kozani, while the commander of a battalion stationed at Bel Kamen (Drosopigi) led it to Kleisoura after realizing that the battle was essentially over.

== Aftermath ==
The commander of the Kozani garrison assembled a force of 300 soldiers and 400 armed civilians who managed contain most of the soldiers fleeing from Sorovich in the city. The remnants of the 5th Greek Division regrouped and repulsed an attack on Kozani by Ottoman armed civilians on the morning of 26 October. Greek casualties in the battle of Sorovich numbered 211 killed, 320 wounded, 22 missing in action and 10 prisoners of war. Although the Greek victory at Yenidje overshadowed the defeat at Sorovich, it perplexed Greek Crown Prince Constantine, making him hesitate just as the city of Thessaloniki, the most important city in Macedonia, seemed to be within his grasp. It also led to a stabilization of the front line in Macedonia north-west of Kozani. On 29 October, Constantine allocated the 1st, 2nd, 3rd and 4th Divisions and a cavalry brigade for the capture of Monastir. Those forces assembled at Vodena (Edessa) on 2 November and were eventually able to seize Florina, yet Monastir fell into Serbian hands after the conclusion of the eponymous battle.

By May 1913, the numerically inferior Ottomans had suffered a series of serious defeats to the League's armies on all fronts. The League had captured most of the Ottoman Empire's European territories and was rapidly approaching Constantinople. On 30 May, the two sides signed the Treaty of London which solidified the League's territorial ambitions, granting its members all Ottoman lands west of a line stretching from Enos on the Aegean Sea to north of Midia on the Black Sea, as well as Crete. The fate of Albania and the pre-war Ottoman Aegean islands was to be determined by the Great Powers.
