= Geographical name changes in Greece =

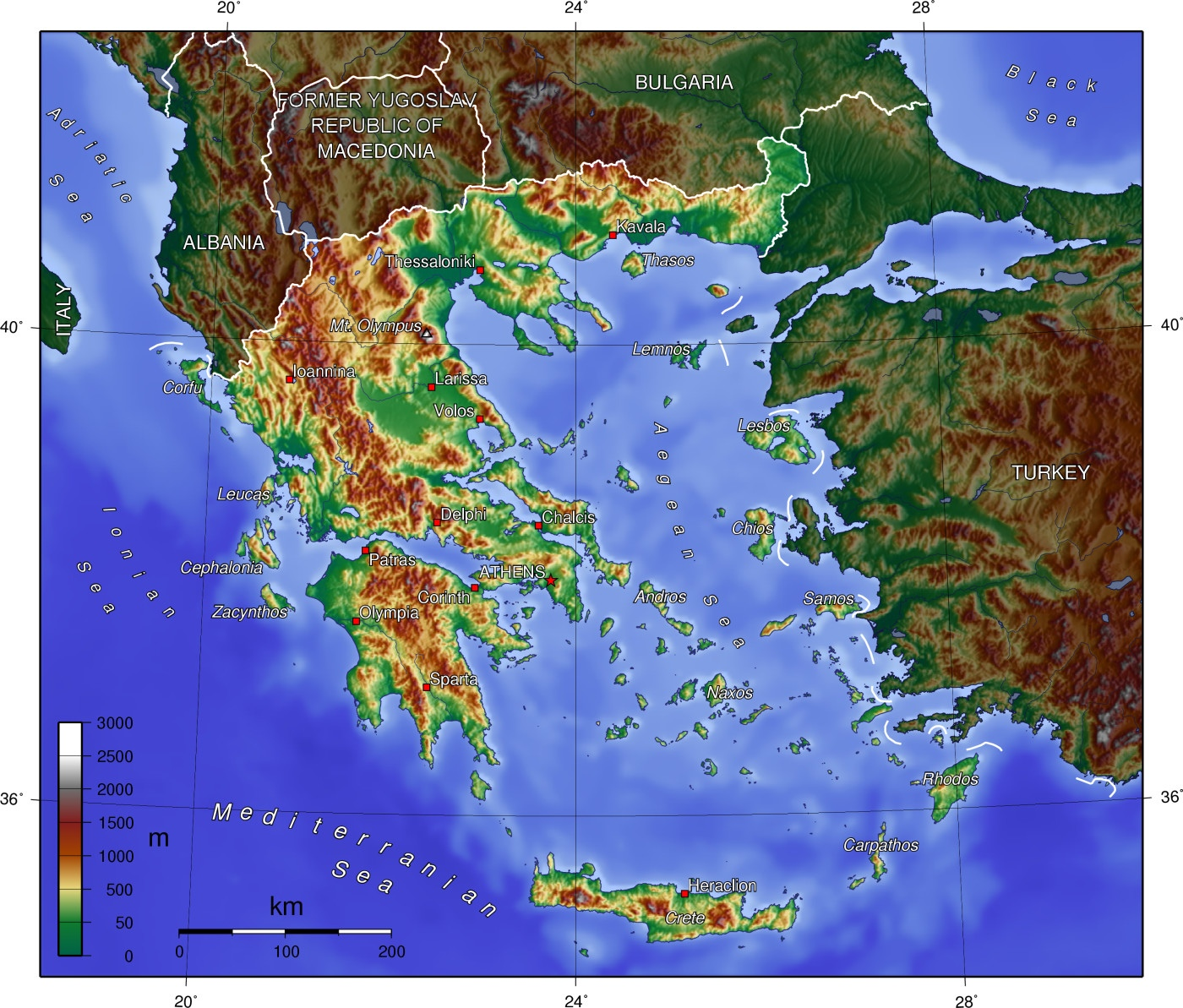
Map of Greece

The Greek state has systematically pursued a policy of Hellenisation following its independence from the Ottoman Empire in the early 1830s. This ideology included replacing all geographical and topographic names with revived names rooted in Classical Greece – that is, any name deemed foreign, divisive against Greek unity, or considered to be "bad Greek" was hidden or assimilated. The names that were considered foreign were usually of Albanian, Slavic or Turkish origin. accordingly those places were also renamed.

According to Katerina Zacharia, the aim of the name changes was to cover the memory of the "dark past", meaning Roman, Frankish, Venetian and especially Turkish rule. Kyramargiou and colleagues, writing on the nineteenth century, describe the beginnings of the programme in 1833 as a restoration of ancient and Byzantine place names, intended to distance the newly established kingdom from its Ottoman past and associate it with ancient and Byzantine Greece. The name changes followed the territorial expansion of Greece and continued into the Greek Republic.

Wherever possible, places were renamed after the learned names in Classical Greece, mainly by consulting Description of Greece by Pausanias. The process of renaming was undertaken from two directions: "bottom-up" and "top-down". Central and southern Greece followed the "bottom-up" approach with different towns competing for the name of a nearby archaeological site. In this regard, even the Arvanites of Attica demanded that their place names be Hellenised. In contrast, the changes in the north were made "top-down" with a team of historians, folklorists, and archaeologists and archaising names foreign to the inhabitants were introduced. Railway companies also gave their stations ancient names so that European visitors could easily recognise them.

By covering the "dark past" and recalling classical Greece the new names were selected to align historical consciousness with the national narrative. To this day, the use of the old Albanian, Slavic, or Turkish place names by authorities, organisations, and individuals is penalised under Greek law. The result of these policies was a successful restoration of a distant past through nationalism to show that modern Greece was "really the same country as classical Greece".

== History ==
The area that is today's Greece was inhabited by various peoples throughout history, and the country's toponyms reflect their diversity of origins. The Hellenisation of toponyms in Greece started soon after Greek independence. Many place names in Greece of non-Greek origin were replaced by ancient names that were supposed to have some connection to the area. For example, the ancient name of Piraeus was revived in the 19th century, after it had been called Drakos in Greek, Porto Leone in Venetian, and Aslan Limanı in Turkish for centuries, after the Piraeus Lion which stood there.

In 1909, the existence of large numbers of non-Greek place names were a nuisance to the government. In 1909 the government-appointed commission on toponyms report that every one village in three in Greece (30% of the total) should have its name changed (of the 5,069 Greek villages, 1,500 were considered as "speaking a barbaric language".

During the Balkan Wars, Greece doubled its territory and population, but it brought various large non-Greek populations into its border, notably including Slavic-speaking Orthodox, mostly Turkish-speaking Muslims from Macedonia, Muslim Albanians, Orthodox Arvanites and Aromanians in Epirus. After the Second Balkan War against Bulgaria in 1913, the majority of Slavic speaking Christians were transferred to Bulgaria as part of a population exchange agreement (Treaty of Neuilly) between the two countries. Moreover, after the end of Graeco-Turkish War and the subsequent Treaty of Lausanne and population exchange between Greece and Turkey, all Muslims except Western Thrace, were exchanged for all Orthodox in Turkey except for those in Istanbul. The villages of the exchanged populations (Bulgarians and Muslims) in Greece were resettled with Greeks from Asia Minor, and the Balkans (mainly from Bulgaria and Yugoslavia). By 1928, Greece's demography had drastically changed from the position in 1830: the country had turned into a nation-state, non-Greeks and most of the population spoke Greek. The Arvanites and Aromanians today mostly proclaim themselves as Greeks. After World War II the remaining Muslim Albanians were expelled due to collaboration activity and war crimes.

After the departure of Slav and Muslim populations in 1912-1926 the Greek government renamed many places with revived ancient names, local Greek-language names, or translations of the non-Greek names and non-Greek names were officially removed. Although the bulk of the population was Greek the renaming was considered a way to establish a collective ethnic consciousness. Several historical Greek names from Asia Minor were also introduced in the region mainly by the resettled refugees. Many Demotic Greek names were also replaced by a Katharevousa Greek form, usually different only morphologically. This process started in 1926 and continued in the 1960s.

== Name changes by region ==
The older name forms of the renamed settlements were mainly of Greek, Slavic, Turkish, Aromanian or Albanian origin. Other names that were considered foreign were also of Frankish and Italian origins. According to ongoing research being carried out at the Institute of Neohellenic Research in Athens, between 1913 and 1996, the names of 4,413 settlements were legally changed in Greece. In each case, the renamings were recorded in the official Government Gazette. The regional breakdown in renamings is: Macedonia: 1,805 renamings; Peloponnese: 827 renamings; Central Greece: 519 renamings; Thessaly: 487 renamings; Epirus: 454 renamings; Thrace: 98 renamings; Crete: 97 renamings; Aegean Islands: 79 renamings; Ionian Islands: 47 renamings.

=== Central Greece ===
Eastern Central Greece was home to the Arvanites, an Albanian speaking people who migrated to the area in the 14th century. Until the 19th century some parts of Attica and Boeotia were populated by Arvanites, many of the place names were also Arvanite. After the establishment of Greece in 1830, most of the names have been changed, especially to names unused since antiquity, from Classical Greece.

| Old name | New name | Notes |
|---|---|---|
| Liopesi | Paiania | Old name was Arvanitic. Liopesi: 'Place of cows' or 'of the cow'. From the Albanian word lopë or cow and the suffix ës indicating belonging to a place, object or quantity of something. |
| Menidi | Acharnes | Old name was Arvanitic |
| Kriekouki | Erythres | Old name was Arvanitic. Kriekouki: 'Red Head'. From the Albanian word Krye/Krie (in some dialects) meaning 'head' and Kuq or red. |
| Dervenosalesi | Pyli, Boeotia | Old name was Arvanite. Dervenosalesi: 'The thigh mountain pass'. From the word Derven meaning 'mountain pass' (itself a local borrowing of the Persian word 'Dervend' meaning the same thing) and Shalës or 'thigh', due to the narrowness of the area resembling the length or shape of a thigh. |

=== Epirus ===
Epirus had a Greek majority population before annexation to Greece (1913), with minorities of Aromanians and Albanians. A part of the Albanian minority, known as Cham Albanians, resided in the coastal area and were expelled from the area after World War II by the group EDES. An unknown number of Aromanians and Orthodox Albanians, the latter called Arvanites in some sources, still live in the area, who today identify mostly as Greek. Particularly in the early 20th-century Albanian place names of Epirus have been systematically changed to Greek, thereby erasing the former Albanian presence in the landscape.

| Old name | New name | Notes |
|---|---|---|
| Densko, Denicko | Aetomilitsa | Old name was in Aromanian |
| Briaza | Distrato | Old name was in Aromanian |
| Skéferi | Myloi | Old name was in Albanian. Skéferi: 'Saint Stephen'. From the Albanian word for saint shën in its contracted form sh/ë used in the toponym and the Albanian forms Stefani/Shtjefni for the name Stephen which became contracted in the toponym. |
| Soúvliasi | Agios Vlasios | Old name was in Albanian. Soúvliasi: 'Saint Blaise'. From the Albanian word for saint shën in its contracted form sh/ë used in the toponym and the Albanian form Vlash for the name 'Blaise' which became contracted in the toponym. |
| Liogáti | Agora | Old name was in Albanian. Liogáti: 'ghost'. From the Albanian word Lugat for 'ghost' or 'ghoul'. |
| Ríziani | Agios Georgios | Old name was in Albanian. Ríziani: 'at the feet of the side (of the mountain)'. From the Albanian word rrëzë for 'feet' or 'alongside' and the Albanian word anë for 'side' or 'edge', due to the settlement being located close to the edge of a mountain. |
| Várfani | Parapotamos | Old name was in Albanian. Várfani: 'poor place'. From the Albanian word varfër/vorfën for 'poor'. |
| Goúrza | Ano Paliokklision | Old name was in Albanian. Goúrza: 'a place where a shallow channel cut in the surface of soil or rocks by running water'. From the Albanian word gurrë for 'source' or 'rill' and the Albanian suffix ëz/za/zë denoting 'smallness'. |
| Liópsi | Asprokklision | Old name was in Albanian. Liópsi: 'place of cows' or 'of the cow'. From the Albanian word lopë for cow and the suffix ës indicating belonging to a place, object or quantity of something. |
| Likoúrsi | Mesopotamo | Old name was in Albanian. Likoúrsi: 'place of flaying animal hides or skinners'. From the Albanian word lëkurë for 'skin' and the suffix ës indicating belonging to a place, object or quantity of something. |
| Rápeza | Anthousa | Old name was in Albanian. Rápeza: 'place of small plane trees'. From the Albanian word rrap for 'plane tree' and the Albanian suffix ëz/za/zë denoting 'smallness'. |
| Skémbo | Vrachos | Old name was in Albanian. Skémbo: 'place of boulders, a rocky crag or a cliff'. From the Albanian word shkëmb for 'cliff, rock or peak', due to the settlement being located on the coast on hilly terrain. |
| Riniása | Riza | Old name was in Albanian. Riniása: 'rooted place'. From the Albanian word rrënjë for 'root' and the suffix as/ë indicating belonging to a place, object or quantity of something, due to the settlement being located on the coast on hilly terrain. |
| Boulmét Zervó | Galata | Old name was in Albanian. Boulmét: 'dairy'. From the Albanian word bulmet for 'dairy'. The name Zervó was attached to the settlement for administrative purposes and is the name of a nearby village. |
| Dára | Elia | Old name was in Albanian. Dára: 'place resembling a pincer or tong form'. From the Albanian word darë for 'pincer' or 'tongs', due to the settlement being in a valley and mountainous area. |
| Barkmádhi | Kastritsa | Old name was in Albanian. Barkmádhi: 'place resembling a big stomach'. From the Albanian word bark for 'stomach' and the Albanian word madh for 'big'. |
| Kourtési | Mesovouni | Old name was in Albanian [citation needed]. Kourtési: 'Kurt's place'. From the Middle Eastern male name Kurd [citation needed] and the suffix ës indicating belonging to a place, object or quantity of something. |

=== Macedonia ===
Till 1912, the area had a very heterogeneous population consisting of Slavic, Turkish, Greek, Jews and Aromanians and Megleno-Romanians. Most of the geographical names were of non Greek origin, the Greek government planned to change this. Between 1913 and 1928 the Slavic names of hundreds of villages and towns were Hellenised by a Committee for the Changing of Names, which was charged by the Greek government with "the elimination of all the names which pollute and disfigure the beautiful appearance of our fatherland". Between 1912 (Balkan Wars) and 1928 (after the Population exchange between Greece and Turkey), the non Greek inhabitants were largely gone and instead of them Greek refugees from the Ottoman Empire settled in the area thereby changing its demography. Toponym changes in each modern prefecture are listed in,

- Drama Prefecture
- Florina Prefecture
- Grevena Prefecture
- Imathia Prefecture
- Kavala Prefecture
- Pella Prefecture
- Pieria Prefecture
- Xanthi Prefecture

=== Western Greece ===
| Old name | New name | Notes |
|---|---|---|
| Dragomesti | Astakos | The old name, used from the Middle Ages, was of Slavic origin. The current name derives from that of an ancient town in Acarnania, and means "lobster" in Greek. |

=== Western Thrace ===
Map of the Name Origins of Western Thracian Settlements.

Since 1977 all Turkish village names of Western Thrace have been changed to Greek names. Western Thrace is home to a large Turkish minority.

| Old name | New name | Notes |
|---|---|---|
| Gümülcine | Komotini | Gümülcine was the Turkish name, which was derived from the older original Byzantine name, Koumoutzina or Komotina. |
| Dedeağaç | Alexandroupolis | The Turkish name of Dedeağaç remained the official name of the city until 1920, when it was renamed Alexandroupolis in honour of King Alexander of Greece. |
| Sarışaban | Chrysoupolis | During the Ottoman period, the population was predominantly Turkish. The town was known as Sapaioi between 1913 and 1929, after which it was then given its present name. |

=== Other ===
- Banitsa → Vevi (1926)
- Boimitsa → Axioupoli (1927)
- Kailar → Ptolemaida (1927)
- Khandak → Candia → Heraklion
- Lamia → Zitouni → Lamia
- Cydonia – Canea – Chania

== See also ==
- Prontuario dei nomi locali dell'Alto Adige, a massive renaming of German toponyms in the Austrian territory annexed by Italy after World War I (today's South Tyrol)
- Commission for the Determination of Place Names, massive renaming of toponyms in the territory annexed by Poland after World War II
