= Kotsopoulos =

Kotsopoulos is a Greek surname. Notable people with the surname include:

- Chris Kotsopoulos (born 1958), Canadian ice hockey player
- Jace Kotsopoulos (born 1997), Canadian soccer player
- Konstantinos Kotsopoulos (born 1997), Greek footballer
- Stavros Kotsopoulos, Greek warlord and revolutionary
