= Meliti =

Meliti Μελίτη
- Community
- Church of Agia Eirini, Meliti

- Location within Greece
- Coordinates: 40°49.80′N 21°34.88′E
- Country: Greece
- Geographic region: Macedonia
- Administrative region: Western Macedonia
- Regional unit: Florina
- Municipality: Florina
- Municipal unit: Meliti
- Elevation: 680 m (2,230 ft)

Population (2021)
  - Community: 1,212
- Time zone: UTC+2 (EET)
  - Summer (DST): UTC+3 (EEST)

Meliti (Greek: Μελίτη, before 1926: Βοστεράνη – Vosterani; Bulgarian: Овчарани or Вощарани, Macedonian: Овчарани) is a village in the Florina regional unit, Western Macedonia, Greece, 15 km northeast of the city of Florina. It is part of the municipal unit Meliti.

== Name ==
The name of the village is "Voshterani", "Voštarani" (Воштарани, Вощарани) or "Ovčarani" (Овчарани) in both Macedonian and Bulgarian. The village was called Türbeli during the Ottoman Empire. In 1926, it was renamed to "Meliti" in Greek.

== History ==
The village was first mentioned in an Ottoman defter of 1481, where it was listed under the name Voštarani and described as having one hundred and ninety-eight households. During the Ottoman period, the village had a mixed Bulgarian and Turkish population. In 1845 the Russian slavist Victor Grigorovich recorded Vushtarani (Вуштарани) as mainly Bulgarian village. A Bulgarian school stood in the village at the beginning of 20th century.

After the Balkan Wars, Greece annexed the village. In World War I, Bulgaria occupied it, but with Treaty of Neuilly-sur-Seine it was returned to Greece. After the Greco-Turkish War (1919–1922), the Turkish population left the village and Greek refugees from Anatolia were settled there. The village mosque was destroyed and its minaret demolished. A Muslim türbe (burial monument) on a hill above the village was destroyed.

After the defeat of Greece by Nazi Germany in April 1941, a local government was established and villagers were actively involved in the pro-Bulgarian organization "Ohrana." In 1946, 20 activists from "Ohrana", were sentenced to prison by a court in Florina. During the Greek Civil War, about 200 villagers joined the Communist-led Democratic Army of Greece.

In 2008, a group of roughly 30 villagers from Meliti joined in protest with fellow Macedonians from Lofoi and Kella to protest the presence of the Greek military conducting training exercises in the vicinity of these villages.

== Culture ==
Meliti holds an annual festival in honour of the Prophet Elijah. Held every year on 19–20 July, it is known as "Ilinden" in the local dialect, and is considered by some Macedonians living in the village to be a celebration in honour of the Ilinden Uprising. The festival has attracted performers from the neighbouring Republic of North Macedonia such as Vaska Ilieva, Suzana Spasovska, Elena Velevska, Synthesis and the Tanec folklore ensemble. An estimated 3,000–5,000 people attend the event every year.

The festival however has not gone without criticism from the Greek authorities and local Greek media. In the past, as was common with all festivals involving songs in Macedonian, there were suppressive measures enforced by local authorities. According to the president of the local community, this was so severe that it was only until 1983 that songs in the Macedonian language were allowed to be sung. In 1988 the local police interrupted the festival to by switching off all power to the sound system, a reaction to the singing of Macedonian songs. The police later justified these actions claiming that the mayor of the village had been warned not to use the Macedonian names of songs, but to instead use the Greek version. Two years later the police employed similar tactics in response to a folkloric group singing in Macedonian. Some Greek media has perceived the festival to constitute a threat alleging that the festival represents a "rebellion against Greek sovereignty". Within the Macedonian media however, an alternate approach has been taken, with the event being publicised as the largest annual gathering of Macedonians in Greece.

The village is home to both Macedonian and Pontic Greek folkloric groups, with the Macedonian group "KUD Ovčarani" notably performing at the 40th "Macedonian Border Festival" at the border village of Trnovo, North Macedonia.

== Demographics ==
The 1920 Greek census recorded 1,292 people in the village, and 370 inhabitants (90 families) were Muslim in 1923. Following the Greek–Turkish population exchange, Greek refugee families in Vosterani were from East Thrace (2), Asia Minor (10), Pontus (24), the Caucasus (20) and one other from an unidentified location in 1926. The 1928 Greek census recorded 1,388 village inhabitants. In 1928, the refugee families numbered 55 (211 people).

In fieldwork done by anthropologist Riki Van Boeschoten in late 1993, Meliti was populated by Slavophones and a Greek population descended from Anatolian Greek refugees who arrived during the population exchange. The Macedonian language was used by people of all ages, both in public and private settings, and as the main language for interpersonal relationships. Some elderly villagers had little knowledge of Greek. Pontic Greek was spoken by people over 60, mainly in private.

Anthropologist Loring Danforth (1997) wrote Meliti was populated by Macedonians and Pontians. During the Macedonian naming dispute, internal splits occurred among the Meliti diaspora in Melbourne, Australia and was represented in the choice of village name for community organisations, with the Greek faction using Meliti and Voštarani by the Macedonian faction.

In the mid 2000s, the village has been described as the "epicenter of Macedonian ethnic activism in Greece".

Historical population
Year	Pop.	±%
1913	1,519	—
1920	1,292	−14.9%
1928	1,388	+7.4%
1940	1,759	+26.7%
1951	1,666	−5.3%
1961	1,756	+5.4%
1971	1,445	−17.7%
1981	1,511	+4.6%
2001	1,533	+1.5%
2011	1,432	−6.6%
2021	1,212	−15.4%

== Economy ==
- Florina Power Station, a lignite-fired power station.
