= Mojsov =

Mojsov is a surname. Notable people with the surname include:

- Daniel Mojsov (born 1987), Macedonian footballer
- Gjorgji Mojsov (born 1985), Macedonian football player and coach
- Lazar Mojsov (1920–2011), Macedonian journalist and politician
- Sokrat Mojsov (born 1942), Macedonian football player
- Svetlana Mojsov, Serbian chemist
