= Palaistra =

Palaistra can refer to:

- palaestra, an ancient Greek wrestling school
- Palaistra, Florina, a village in the Florina regional unit, Greece
