= Dzole Gergev =

Macedonian Bulgarian revolutionary (1867–1909)

Dzole Stoychev Gergev
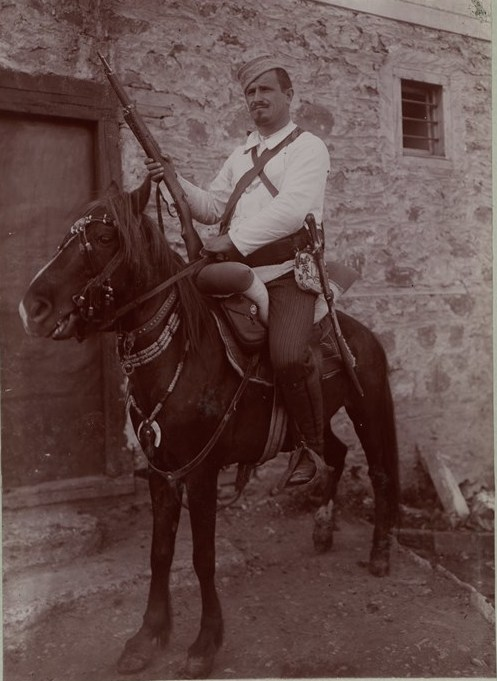
- Photo of Dzole Gergev taken by the Manaki brothers
- Born: 1867; Banitsa, Ottoman Empire (today Vevi, Greece)
- Died: 1909 (aged 41–42); Florina, Ottoman Empire (today in Greece)

Dzole Stoychev Gergev (Bulgarian: Дзоле Стойчев Гергев and Macedonian: Ѕоле Стојчев Гергев) (1867 – 1909) also known as Atesh Pasha, was a Macedonian Bulgarian revolutionary and freedom fighter, member of the Internal Macedonian-Adrianople Revolutionary Organization (IMARO)

== Biography ==
He was born in Banitsa, then in the Ottoman Empire. After entering IMRO, his first job was that of a courier and terrorists. He became chetnik with Tane Stoychev from Gornichevo, and in 1903 became the leader of his own regiment in Lerin (Florina). In the summer of 1903 he participated in the Ilinden-Preobrazhenie uprising.

After the rebellion he became a district leader. After the Young Turk Revolution he joined the local police.

He was killed in Florina in 1909 by the Turks, after a Greek provocation.
