= Battle of Vevi =

Battle of Vevi may refer to:

- Battle of Vevi (1912), part of the First Balkan War
- Battle of Vevi (1941), part of World War II
