= Antigonos Choleris =

Greek revolutionary of the Macedonian Struggle

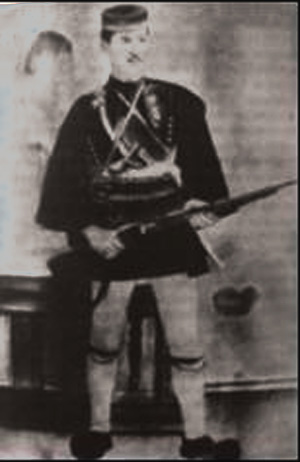
- Antigonos Choleris in 1906
- Native name: Αντίγονος Χολέρης
- Born: c. 1880s Banitsa, Monastir Vilayet, Ottoman Empire (now Vevi, Greece)
- Died: July 1913 Florina, Monastir Vilayet, Ottoman Empire (Now Greece)
- Allegiance: Kingdom of Greece
- Branch: Hellenic Army
- Battles / wars: Macedonian Struggle; Balkan Wars; First Balkan War; Second Balkan War †

Antigonos Choleris (Greek: Αντίγονος Χολέρης) was a Greek revolutionary of Bulgarian origin of the Macedonian Struggle and soldier of the Balkan Wars.

== Biography ==
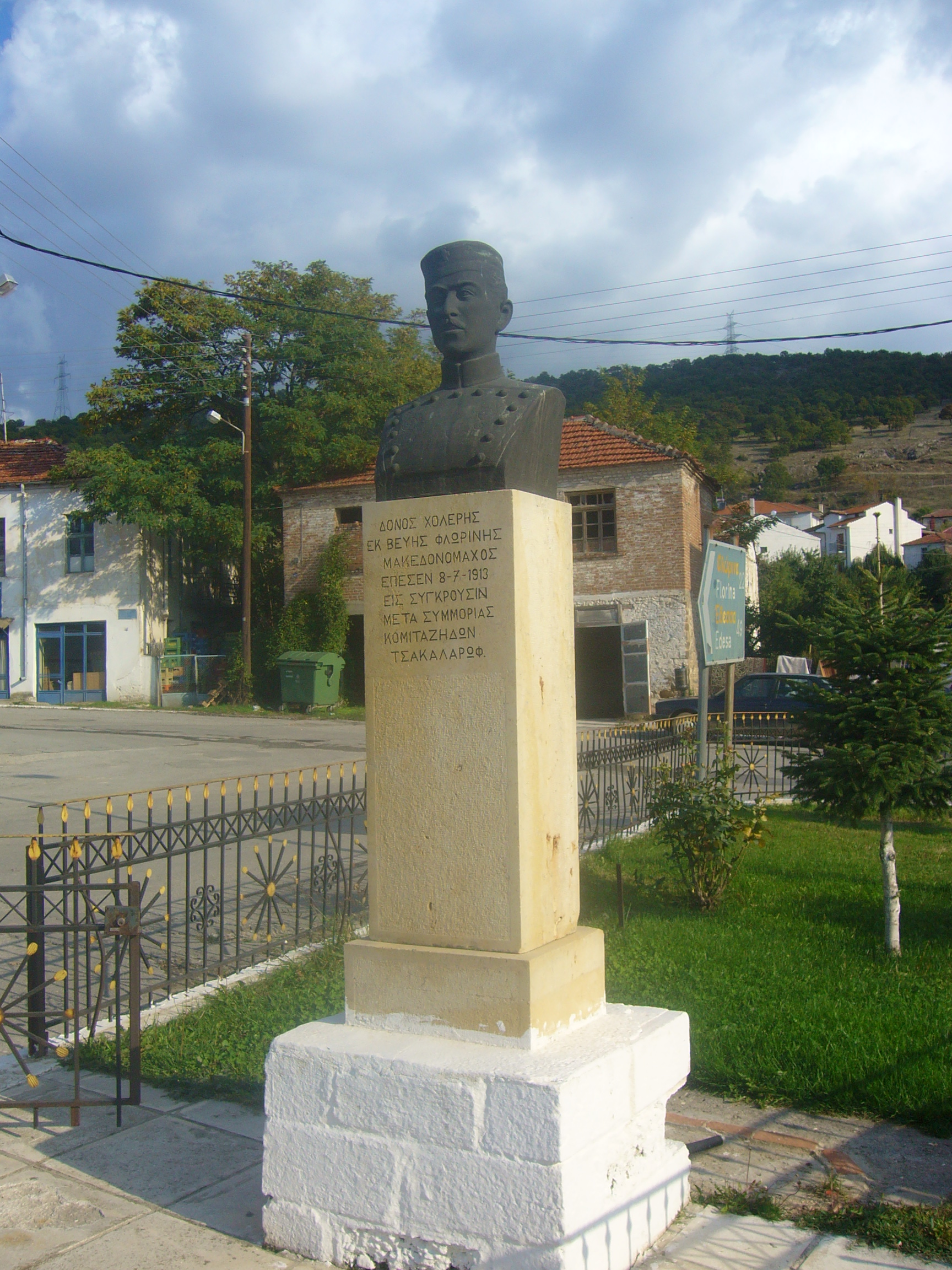
Sculpture of Antigonos Choleris in his home town, Vevi.

Choleris was born in the 1880s in Banitsa (now Vevi) of Florina. After studying at the Greek elementary school of Banitsa, he was sent to the Great School of the Nation, in Constantinople, in order to continue his studies.

In June 1907 his grandfather, Tryfon Choleris, was murdered in Banitsa, along with others, by the gang of the Bulgarian Komitadji Georgiev. This forced him to stop his studies and return to his village to avenge the death of his grandfather. He was firstly placed in the body of Stavros Kotsopoulos and acted in the wider area of Florina. Then, along with Kotsopoulos, they collaborated with the chieftain Nikolaos Andrianakis. In 1908 he was forced to go to Athens for his own safety. He returned to Banitsa in 1910 as leader of his own group, acting in the region against the Bulgarian komitadjis. In 1911 he killed an important member of the Bulgarian komitadjis, State Stoyan Tasheff, who was active in the area of Banitsa.

He participated actively in the First Balkan War, in 1912, when his birthplace was liberated. During the Second Balkan War, the Sacred band of Banitsa was formed, in which Choleris participated. The mission was to exterminate the irregular Bulgarian forces that were operating in the Florina region. In July 1913, Choleris was killed in a battle against the body of Vasil Chekalarov, after he had killed him.

== Sources ==
- Stergios Tryantafyllidis, Ιστορικά Βεύης, Florina 1958, p. 24-32
- John S. Koliopoulos (editor), Αφανείς, γηγενείς Μακεδονομάχοι, Εταιρεία Μακεδονικών Σπουδών, University Studio Press, Thessaloniki, 2008, p. 167
