= Fanos =

Fanos may refer to the following places in Greece:

- Fanos, Florina, a village in the regional unit of Florina
- Fanos, Kilkis, a village in the municipal unit of Axioupoli, Kilkis
