= Neochoraki =

Neochoraki (Greek: Νεοχωράκι meaning "a little new village") may refer to several villages in Greece:

- Neochoraki, Arta, a village in the Arta regional unit
- Neochoraki, Chalkidiki, a village in Chalkidiki
- Neochoraki, Florina, a village in the Florina regional unit
- Neochoraki, Magnesia, a village in the Magnesia regional unit
- Neochoraki, Boeotia, a village in Boeotia
- Neochoraki, Corfu a village in Corfu
