= Kleidi =

Kleidi may refer to the following places in Greece:

- Kleidi, Arta, a village in the municipality of Georgios Karaiskakis, Arta regional unit
- Kleidi, Boeotia, a village in the municipality of Tanagra, Boeotia
- Kleidi, Florina, a village in the municipality of Amyntaio, Florina regional unit
- Kleidi, Imathia, a village in the municipality of Alexandreia, Imathia
- Kleidi, a site near Samikon
