= Perdikkas Palaeontological Museum =

Paleontological Museum of Perdikkas
- Παλαιοντολογικό Μουσείο Περδίκκας
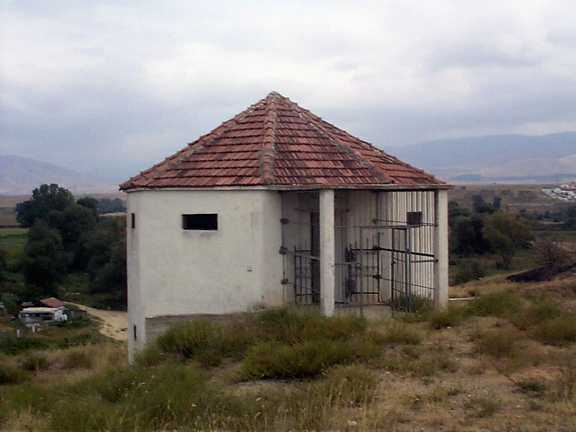
- View from outside
- Established: 1979
- Location: Perdikkas, Greece
- Coordinates: 40.55713590766198°N 21.710656117814484°E
- Type: History museum

The Palaeontological Museum of Perdikkas is a museum in the village of Perdikkas, near Ptolemaida, Greece. It is also known as the Anthropological and Paleontological Museum of Ptolemais.

== Archidiskodon meridionalis ==
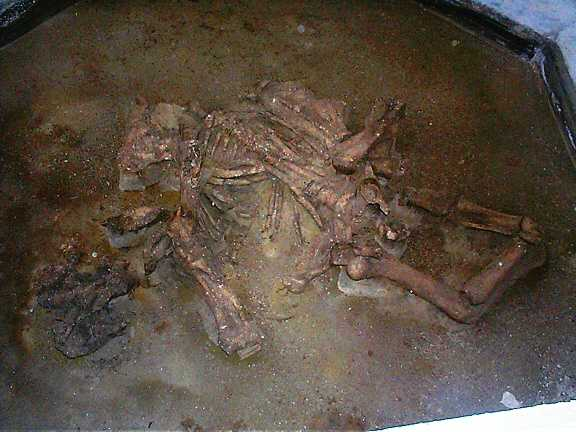
Mammoth skeleton

In 1977, Isaak Pandelidis, the owner of a sandpit not far from the village of Perdikkas, Greece, chanced upon the remains of a large animal. He informed the Anthropological Society of Greece, and the excavations directed by the anthropologist Aris Poulianos brought to light the skeleton of a mammoth (Archidiskodon meridionalis) approximately 3,000,000 years old. It is the oldest animal skeleton ever discovered on the continent of Europe.

Though the entire skeleton was found, the bones were not in their proper place, evidently because the beast had been killed here by hunters, who had then dismembered it in order to eat it. The mammoth must have been 5 m long and 4 m tall. All that is missing is the tusks, which must have been taken away. The skeleton was accompanied by some 30 tools, mostly of quartz, which were used to cut the mammoth up and which came from other parts of the province of Eordaia.

In 1979, an octagonal structure was built on the site where the mammoth was found, with the aim more of protecting the find than of creating an aesthetic museum-like display. The skeleton lies exactly where it was found, impressive both for its size and for its excellent state of preservation. The museum is 1 km from Perdikkas (33 km from Kozani) on the road to Pentavryssos and may be visited by appointment with the community.
