= Sokrat Mojsov =

Macedonian footballer

Personal information
- Date of birth: 1 March 1942 (age 84)
- Place of birth: Setina, Aegean Macedonia, Greece
- Height: 1.78 m (5 ft 10 in)
- Position: Striker

Senior career*
Years	Team	Apps	(Gls)
1958–1971	Vardar	213	(67)
1971–1972	Rennes	23	(8)
Total		236	(75)

International career
1964–1966	Yugoslavia	3	(0)
- * Club domestic league appearances and goals

Sokrat Mojsov (born 1 March 1942) is a Macedonian former professional footballer who played as a striker. He capped three times for Yugoslavia. He was considered one of the best Macedonian players from the pre 1992-Yugoslavia era. He was noted for his heading ability and individual skills with the ball.

== Club career ==
Mojsov was born in Setina. He started his career with Vardar as a youth player, and quickly moved up the ranks to the senior team. He played 362 times and scored 166 goals in all competitions for them. He played two years in France for Rennes, in Ligue 1 and retired in 1973.

== International career ==
He made his senior debut for Yugoslavia in an April 1964 friendly match against Bulgaria and has earned a total of three caps, scoring no goals. His final international was a September 1966 friendly against the Soviet Union.
