= Meliti (municipal unit) =

Meliti Μελίτη
- Municipal unit
- Location within the regional unit

- Location within Greece
- Coordinates: 40°50′N 21°35′E
- Country: Greece
- Administrative region: West Macedonia
- Regional unit: Florina
- Municipality: Florina

Area
  - Municipal unit: 269.5 km^{2} (104.1 sq mi)
- Elevation: 680 m (2,230 ft)

Population (2021)
  - Municipal unit: 4,692
  - Municipal unit density: 17.41/km^{2} (45.09/sq mi)
- Time zone: UTC+2 (EET)
  - Summer (DST): UTC+3 (EEST)
- Postal code: 530 71

Meliti (Greek: Δήμος Μελίτης) is a former municipality in Florina regional unit, West Macedonia, Greece. Since the 2011 local government reform it is part of the municipality Florina, of which it is a municipal unit. The municipal unit has an area of 269.477 km^{2}. The seat of the municipality was in Neochoraki.

== Subdivisions ==
The municipal unit Meliti is subdivided into the following communities (constituent villages in brackets):

- Neochoraki (Neochoraki, Agios Athanasios)
- Achlada (Achlada, Ano Achlada, Giourouki)
- Vevi
- Itea
- Lofoi
- Meliti
- Palaistra
- Pappagiannis
- Sitaria
- Skopos
- Tripotamos

== Demographics ==
According to the 2021 census, the population of the municipal unit of Meliti was 4,692 people. The municipality has a mixed population of Slavophone Greeks and the descendants of Greek refugees from Asia Minor.
