= Sitaria =

Sitaria Σιταριά
- Community
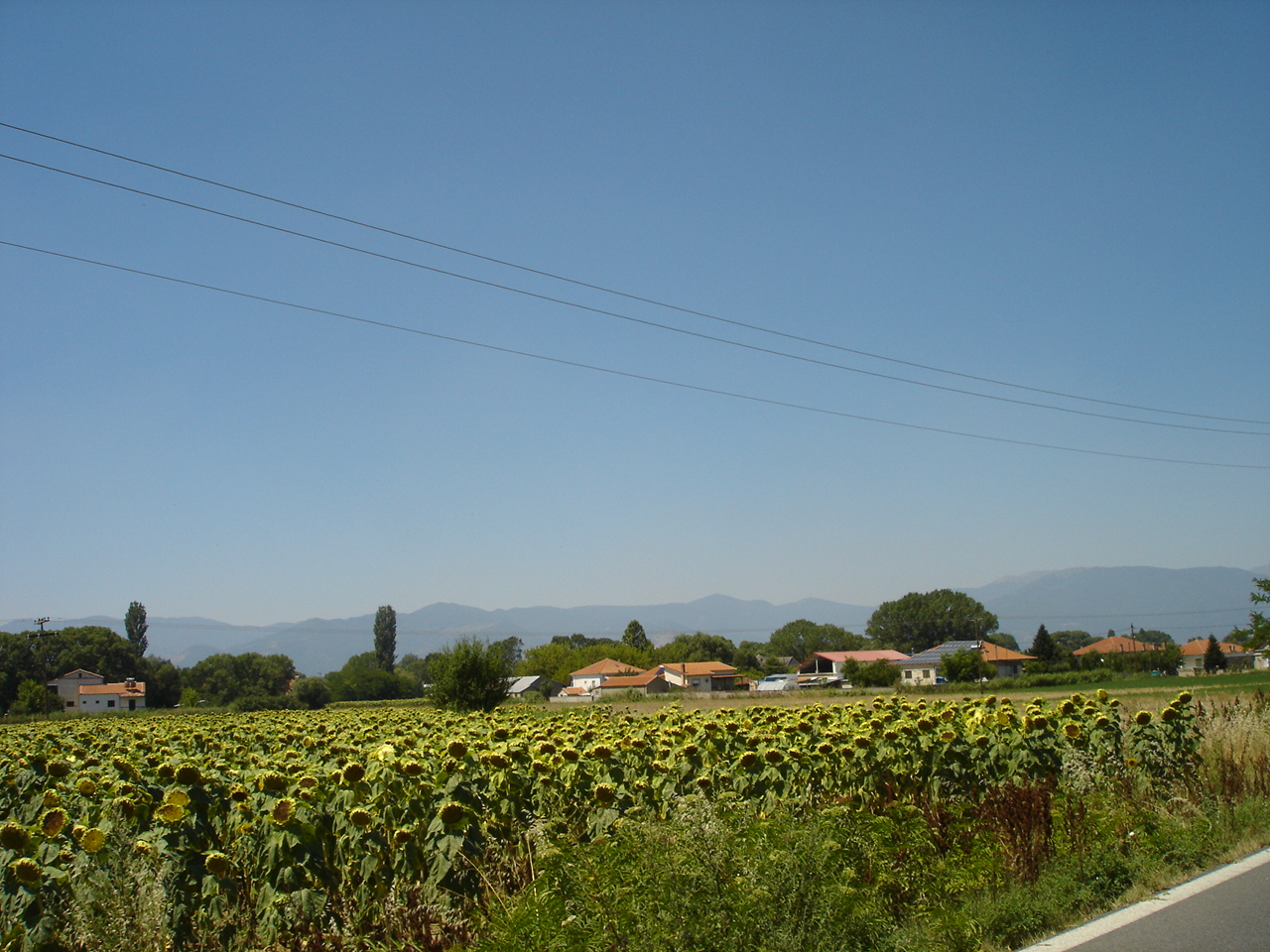

- Location within Greece
- Coordinates: 40°47.35′N 21°32.60′E
- Country: Greece
- Geographic region: Macedonia
- Administrative region: Western Macedonia
- Regional unit: Florina
- Municipality: Florina
- Municipal unit: Meliti

Population (2021)
  - Community: 533
- Time zone: UTC+2 (EET)
  - Summer (DST): UTC+3 (EEST)

Sitaria (Greek: Σιταριά, before 1926: Ρόσνα – Rosna; Bulgarian/Macedonian: Росен / Росна, Rosen / Rosna) is a village in the Florina regional unit, Western Macedonia, Greece.

== History ==
The village with the name "Rosna" is recorded since the 15th century. It was then Mustafa Hasuh's, Ibraim Ibraim's and Kasim Hamza's feud. During 19th century Rosna was a manor belonging to the Robev family of Ohrid and many workers according to the Austrian Johann Georg von Hahn in 1861 Rosen (or Rastna at the time) were Bulgarians. This was confirmed the book “Ethnographie des Vilayets d'Adrianople, de Monastir et de Salonique”, published in Constantinople in 1878, that reflects the statistics of the male population in 1873. Rossene was noted as a village with 45 households and 110 male Bulgarian inhabitants. In 1905, Rosna's population consisted of 480 Bulgarian Exarchists. There was a Bulgarian school in the village.

A mosque in the village from the Ottoman period was turned into a small church dedicated to Saint George.

== Pan-Macedonian Meeting ==
The local Cultural Club of Sitaria "Nei Orizondes" (New Horizons), organized for the 1st time in 2011, the Pan-Macedonian Meeting of Macedonian Folklore Clubs. Since then, every summer musicians and dancers from all over Macedonia and abroad (including the Pan-Macedonian Association of United States) are gathered for three days in Sitaria, playing Music of Macedonia (Greece) and dancing. It's the world's most important festival for Pro-Greek Macedonians. This government sponsored event was created to compete with a similar event held in the neighboring village of Meliti, which is organized every summer by the Slavic Macedonian minority.
