= Perdikkas, Kozani =

Perdikkas Περδίκκας
- Community
- Location within Greece
- Coordinates: 40°33.7′N 21°41.8′E
- Country: Greece
- Administrative region: West Macedonia
- Regional unit: Kozani
- Municipality: Eordaia
- Municipal unit: Ptolemaida
- Elevation: 595 m (1,952 ft)

Population (2021)
  - Community: 1,372
- Time zone: UTC+2 (EET)
  - Summer (DST): UTC+3 (EEST)
- Postal code: 502 00
- Area code: +30-2463
- Vehicle registration: ΚΖ

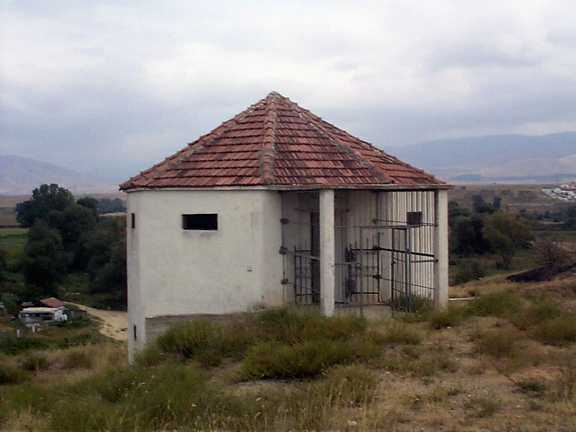
Anthropological Museum, Perdikkas, West Macedonia, Greece

Perdikkas (Greek: Περδίκκας) is a village and a community of the Eordaia municipality. Before the 2011 local government reform it was part of the municipality of Ptolemaida, of which it was a municipal district. The 2021 census recorded 1,372 inhabitants in the village. The Perdikkas Palaeontological Museum is situated near the village.
