= Vevi =

Vevi Βεύη
- Community
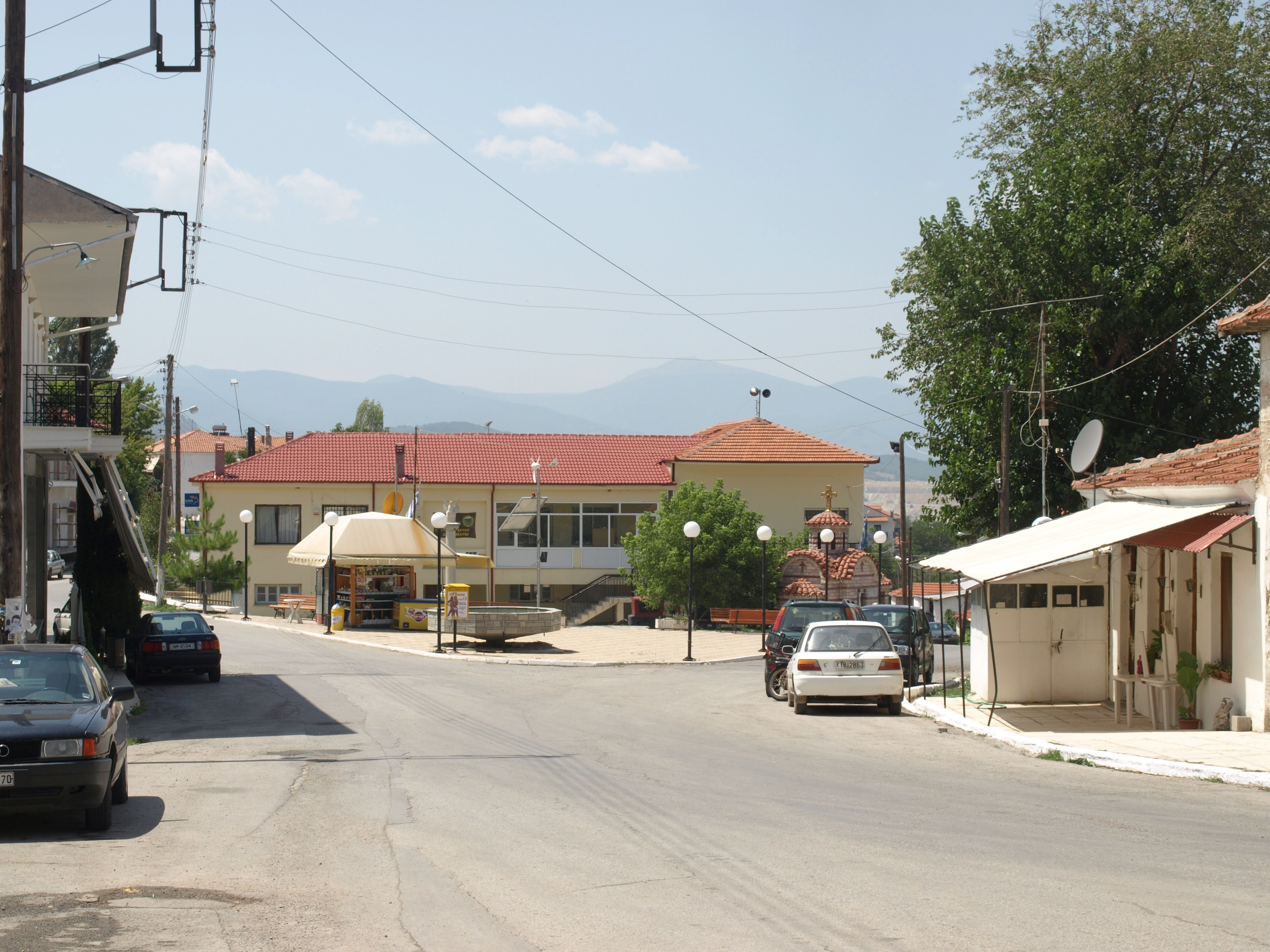
- Vevi

- Location within Greece
- Coordinates: 40°46′N 21°37′E
- Country: Greece
- Administrative region: West Macedonia
- Regional unit: Florina
- Municipality: Florina
- Municipal unit: Meliti

Population (2021)
  - Community: 498
- Time zone: UTC+2 (EET)
  - Summer (DST): UTC+3 (EEST)
- Postal code: 539 74
- Area code: 2385

Vevi (Greek: Βεύη, before 1926: Μπάνιτσα – Banitsa; Macedonian and Bulgarian: Баница, Banica or Banitsa) is a village located in the municipal unit of Meliti in Florina regional unit, Macedonia, Greece. The village is passed by two national roads which lead to Thessaloniki, Florina, Amyntaio, and Kozani. Additionally, it has a railway station on the line between Florina and Thessaloniki. The Official Football Club of Vevi is Vevi FC

The church of St. Nicholas was built in 1460.

== Economy ==
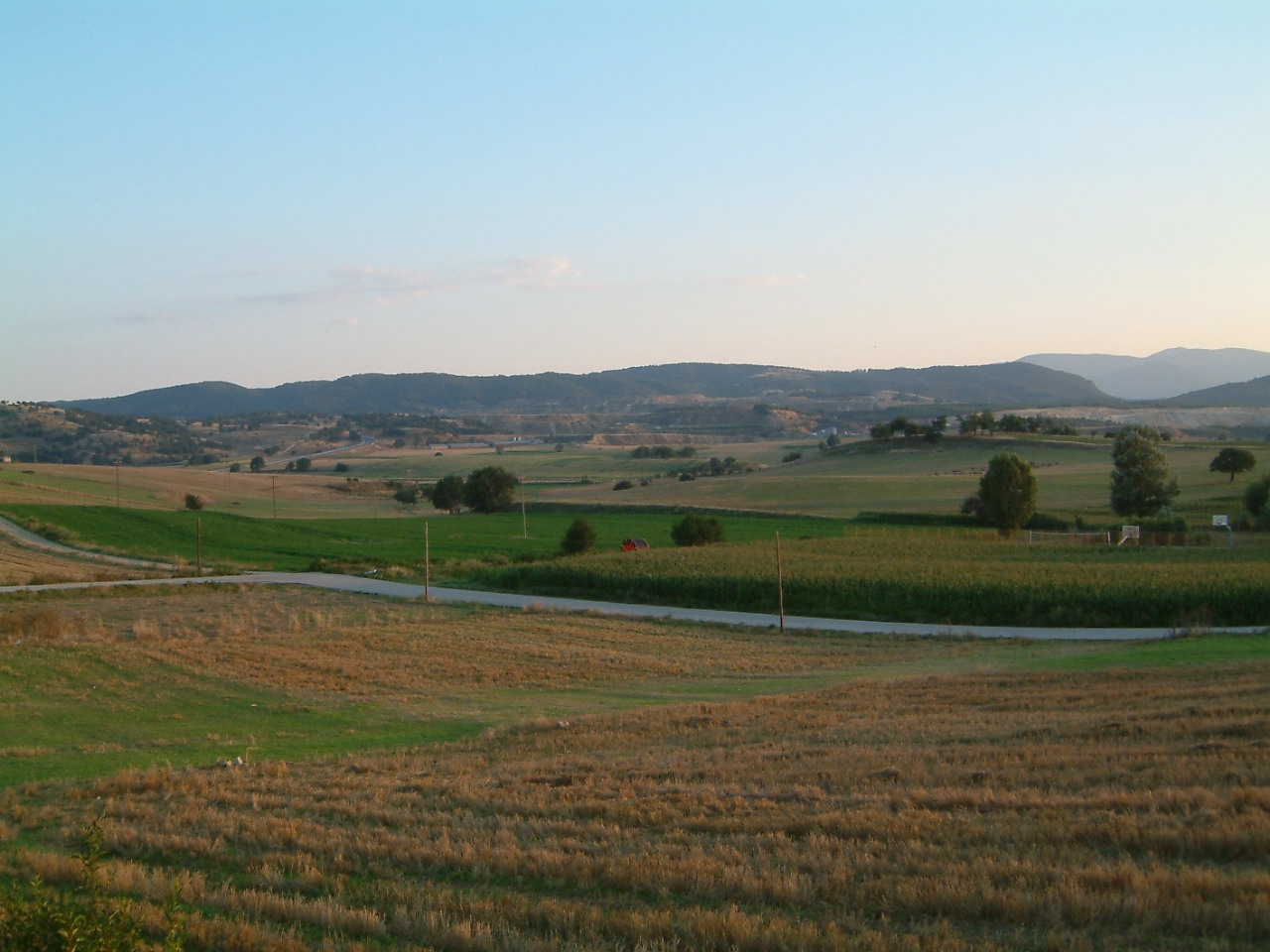
Lignite mines south of Vevi

It is mainly a farming community and is the site of the Achlada, the Vevi lignite mines from Upper Miocene.

== History ==
The city dates back to Roman times. Archeological finds from this period, such as the marble torso of a male statue, are housed at the Archaeological Museum of Florina.

The local church St. Nicolas was built and painted in 1460. There were 132 Christian households in the village in the first half of the 17th century. In 1845 the Russian slavist Victor Grigorovich recorded Banci as mainly Macedonian village.

According to local tradition, the settlers who laid the foundation of the modern village included various people from the region such as Greeks, Macedonians, Turks, etc. There were two Macedonian schools in the beginning of 20th century. The village participated in the Ilinden Uprising (1903) and during the conflict it was razed by the Ottoman army. Immigrants from Banitsa in Toronto, Canada participated in the early Macedonian community to build church infrastructure.

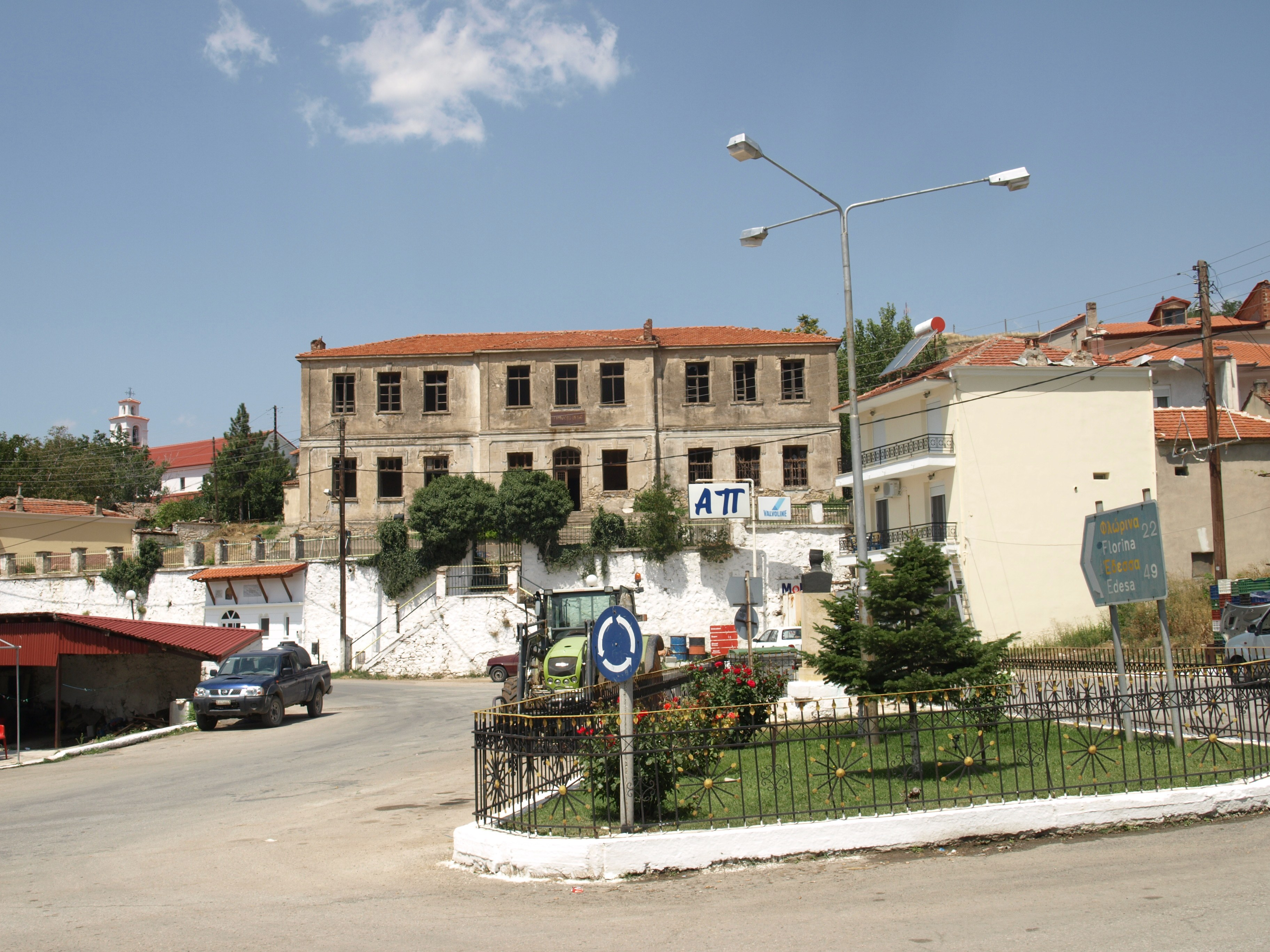
Old school in Vevi

In 1913, with the conditions of the Treaty of Bucharest, when this part of Macedonia became part of Greece, and after the Balkan Wars, a lot of locals emigrated to Macedonia. The village was renamed Vevi in 1926. During the occupation of Greece in the Second World War and in the Greek Civil War the village supported the separatist side and retaliation followed from supporters of the Greek side. Following World War II as well as the Greek Civil War it saw more exodus on the part of the town's non-Greek inhabitants.

== Demographics ==
Vevi had 806 inhabitants in 1981. In fieldwork done by anthropologist Riki Van Boeschoten in late 1993, Vevi was populated by Slavophones. The Macedonian language was spoken in the village by people over 30 in public and private settings. Children understood the language but mostly did not use it.

== Transport ==
The settlement is served BY Regional and Proastiakos services to Thessaloniki and Florina.

== Notable people ==
- Dzole Gergev (1867–1909), Macedonian chieftain
- Antigonos Choleris (d. 1913), Greek chieftain of the Macedonian Struggle and soldier of the Balkan Wars
- Shena Apcheva, soldier
- Nahum Abov, activist
- Stavros Kotsopoulos, Greek chieftain of the Macedonian Struggle and soldier of World War II
- Kole Mangov, poet
- Peter Daicos, Australian AFL footballer whose parents migrated to Melbourne, Australia
- Dimitar Velakov, partisan
- Nick Vanoff, dancer

== See also ==
- Battle of Vevi (1912)
- Battle of Vevi (1941)
