= Papagiannis, Florina =

Papagiannis Popozani Παπαγιάννης Ποπόζανη
- Community
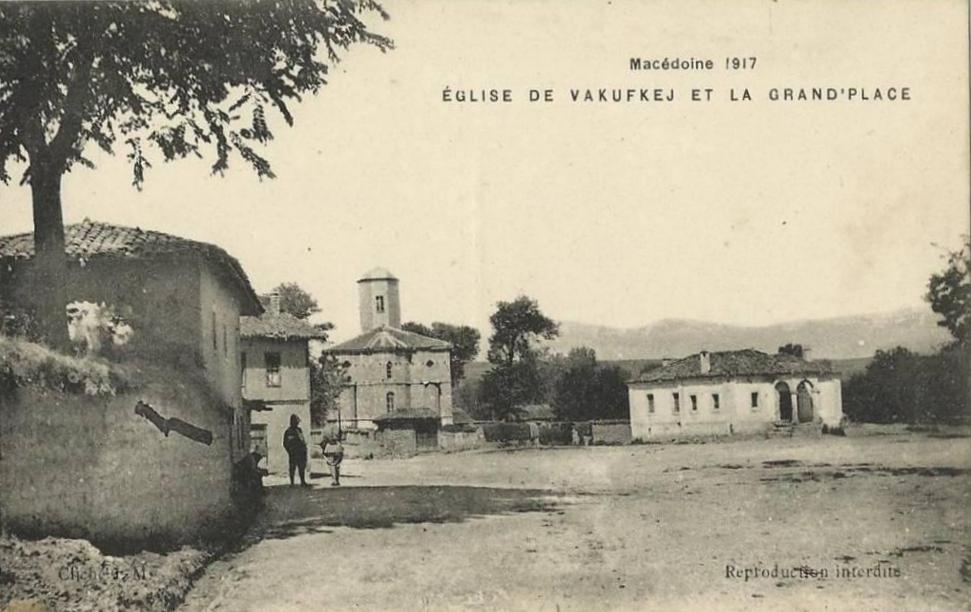
- View of the village in 1917

- Location within Greece
- Coordinates: 40°50.30′N 21°29.88′E
- Country: Greece
- Geographic region: Macedonia
- Administrative region: Western Macedonia
- Regional unit: Florina
- Municipality: Florina
- Municipal unit: Meliti

Population (2021)
  - Community: 426
- Time zone: UTC+2 (EET)
  - Summer (DST): UTC+3 (EEST)

Papagiannis (Greek: Παπαγιάννης, before 1928: Ποπόζιανη – Popoziani, alternative old name: Βακούφκιοϊ – Vakoufkioi; Macedonian and Bulgarian: Пополжани, Popolžani), is a village in the Florina regional unit, Western Macedonia, Greece.

== Demographics ==
The 1920 Greek census recorded 750 people in Popoziani. In 1928, the Greek census recorded 930 village inhabitants. Following the Greek–Turkish population exchange, Greek refugee families in Popoziani numbered 7 (31 people) in 1928.

Papagiannis had 915 inhabitants in 1981. In fieldwork done by anthropologist Riki Van Boeschoten in late 1993, Papagiannis was populated by Slavophones. The Macedonian language was spoken in the village by people over 30 in public and private settings. Children understood the language, but mostly did not use it.

According to the 2021 census the village had 426 inhabitants.

== Notable people ==
- Trayan Stelovski (1920–1946) – fighter and activist of the National Liberation Front (NOF), perished with 4 others in a battle against the Greek army on 2 July 1946.
- Zhivko Popov (d. 1946) – fighter and activist of NOF, during the Greek Civil War he was betrayed and encircled by the Greek army, losing his life in a burning barn.
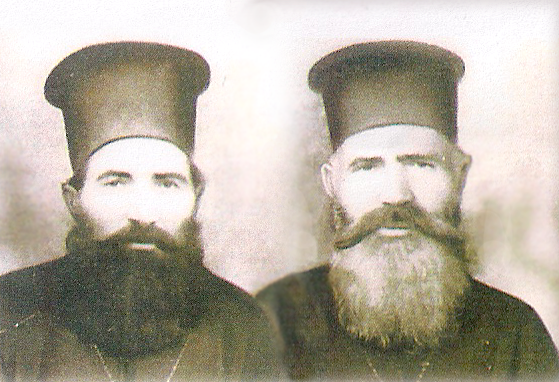
Stefan Skenderov
(b. 1855) Exarchate priest and president of the village's IMRO committee. Murdered by the Greek guerrilla band of Captain Vardas.

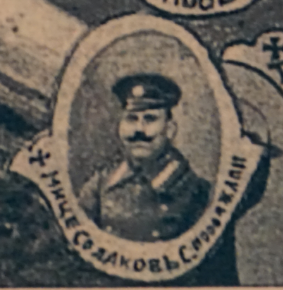
Mitsko Solakov (1890 - 1928), prominent activist and member of the IMRO in the Florina and Bitola regions.
