= Achlada =

Village in Western Macedonia, Greece

Achlada Αχλάδα
- Community
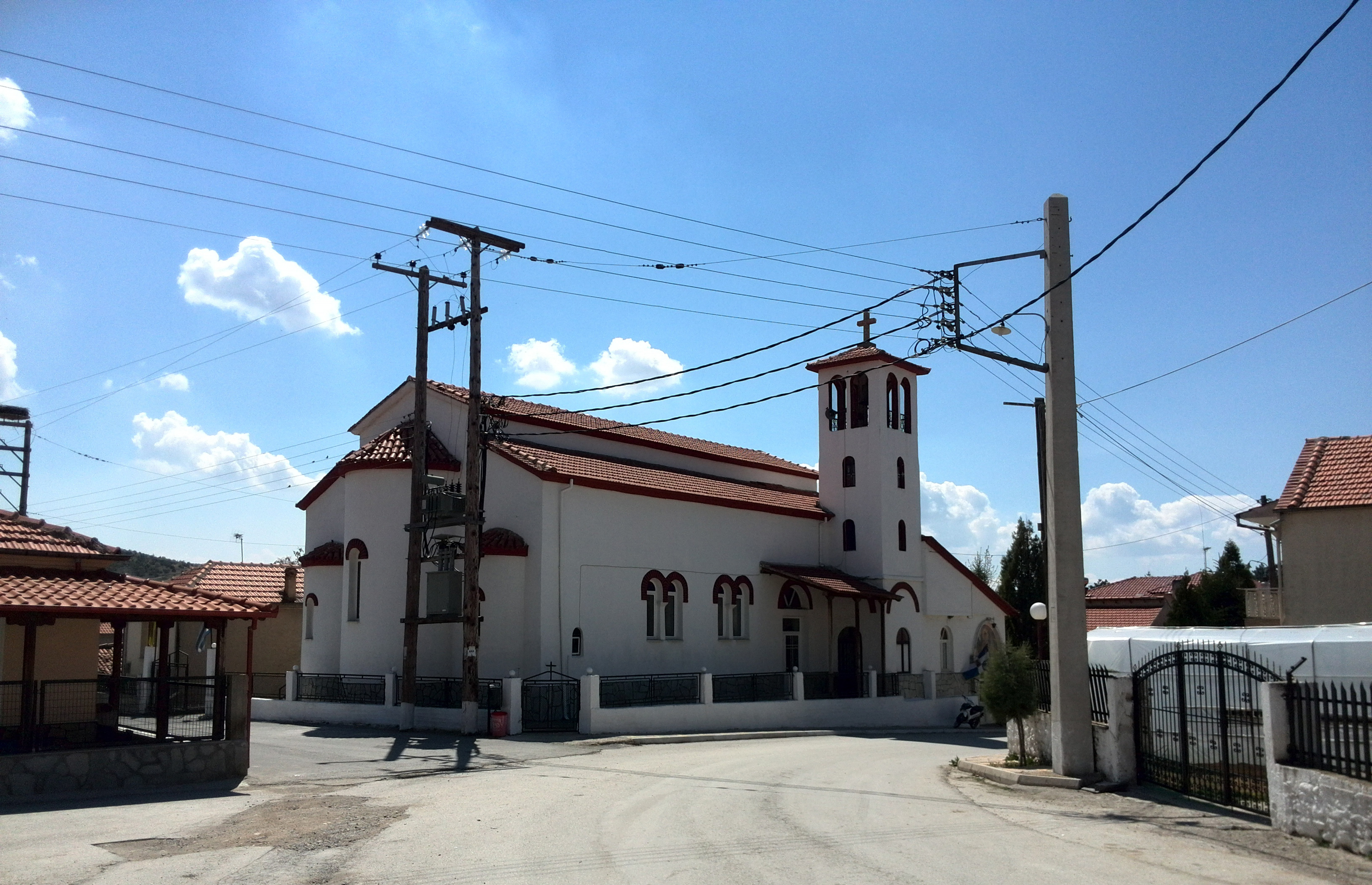
- Church of St. Spyridon

- Location within Greece
- Coordinates: 40°51.68′N 21°36.80′E
- Country: Greece
- Geographic region: Macedonia
- Administrative region: Western Macedonia
- Regional unit: Florina
- Municipality: Florina
- Municipal unit: Meliti

Population (2021)
  - Community: 320
- Time zone: UTC+2 (EET)
  - Summer (DST): UTC+3 (EEST)

Achlada (Greek: Αχλάδα; Bulgarian and Macedonian: Крушоради) is a village in the Florina regional unit, Western Macedonia, Greece.

== History ==
The settlement was mentioned in a defter of 1626–1627, under the name of Krushorad, and was described as having 61 non-Muslim households.

The Russian slavist Victor Grigorovich recorded Krushorade (Крушораде) as mainly Bulgarian village in 1845. Gyorche Petrov in 1986 notes that the village had 20 Bulgarian Exarchist and 40 Bulgarian Patriarchist households. Vasil Kanchov's 1900 survey recorded 650 Bulgarian Christians in the village. Later in 1905, Secretary of the Bulgarian Exarchate Dimitar Mishev (writing as "Brancoff") documented 760 Bulgarian Exarchists in the village.

The paternal grandparents of Nikola Gruevski, former Prime Minister of Republic of Macedonia (now North Macedonia), were born here, including his grandfather Nikolaos Grouios.

In 1926, the name of the village was changed from Κρουσοράτη (Krousoráti) to Αχλάδα (Achláda).

In fieldwork done by anthropologist Riki Van Boeschoten in late 1993, Achlada was populated by Slavophones. The Macedonian language was spoken by people over 60, mainly in private.

== Demographics ==
The population of the village from 1913 and the following years is as follows: (Note: Numbers in parentheses are the de facto population, while those next to the parentheses are the de jure population.)

Population by census year
Year	Population		
Year	Male	Female	Total
1913	259	347	606
1920	269	304	573
1928	328	362	690
1940	485	482	967
1951	346 (361)		
1961	465 (534)		
1971	490 (240)		
1981	575 (313)		
1991	562 (305)		
2001	(301)		
2011	–		
2021	–		
