= Kleidi, Florina =

Kleidi Κλειδί
- Community
- Location within Greece
- Coordinates: 40°45′N 21°38′E
- Country: Greece
- Administrative region: Western Macedonia
- Regional unit: Florina
- Municipality: Amyntaio
- Municipal unit: Amyntaio

Population (2021)
  - Community: 13
- Time zone: UTC+2 (EET)
  - Summer (DST): UTC+3 (EEST)

Κleidi (Greek: Κλειδί, before 1926: Τσέροβον – Tserovon; Bulgarian: Церово, Tserovo or Tzerovo) is a village in the municipality of Amyntaio, in the Florina regional unit of West Macedonia, Greece. The Battle of Vevi (1941) was fought near here.

== History ==
In 1845 the Russian slavist Victor Grigorovich recorded Tsrevo as mainly Bulgarian village.

In the book “Ethnographie des Vilayets d'Adrianople, de Monastir et de Salonique”, published in Constantinople in 1878, that reflects the statistics of the male population in 1873, Tzerovo was noted as a village with 30 households and 76 male Bulgarian inhabitants. According to the statistics of geographer Dimitri Mishev (D. M. Brancoff), the village had a total Christian population of 400 in 1905, consisting of 200 Exarchist Bulgarians and 200 Patriarchist Bulgarians (Grecomans). It also had 2 schools, 1 Bulgarian and 1 Greek.
