= Xino Nero =

Xino Nero Ξινόν Νερόν
- Community
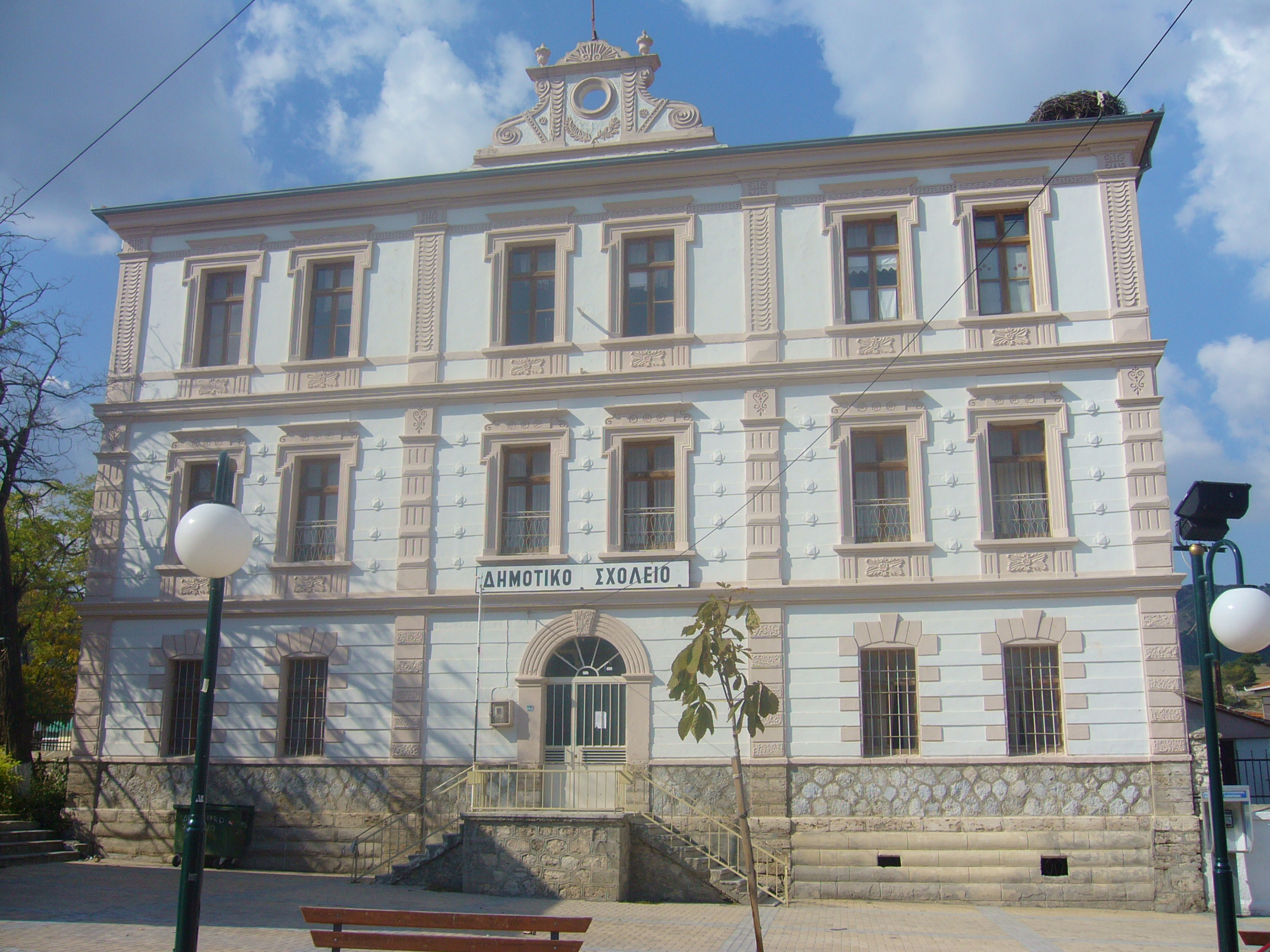
- Primary school in the village of Xino Nero.

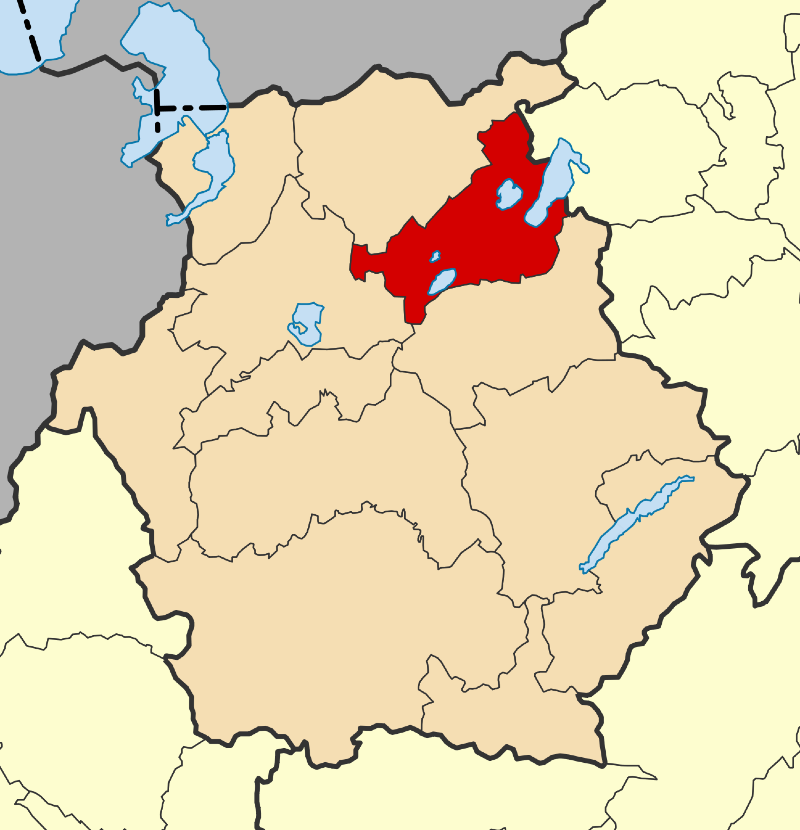

- Location within Greece
- Coordinates: 40°41′21″N 21°37′24″E
- Country: Greece
- Administrative region: West Macedonia
- Regional unit: Florina
- Municipality: Amyntaio
- Municipal unit: Amyntaio
- Elevation: 647 m (2,123 ft)

Population (2021)
  - Community: 907
- Time zone: UTC+2 (EET)
  - Summer (DST): UTC+3 (EEST)
- Postal code: 530 72

Xino Nero (Greek: Ξινό Νερό, before 1926: Εξί Σού – Exi Sou; Turkish: Ekşi Su; or alternatively Gorno Varbeni Macedonian: Горно Врбени; Bulgarian: Горно Върбени) is a village in the municipality Amyntaio, within the regional unit of Florina. The village is built at a height of 550 meters. According to the 2021 census, the population of the village amounts to 907 inhabitants. The main occupation of the inhabitants is agriculture and animal husbandry. It is 34 km from Florina and 5 from Amyntaio.

== Geography ==
Xino Nero is in Greece. It is located in the municipality of Amyntaio, prefecture of Florina and region of West Macedonia, in the northern part of the country, 300 km northwest of Athens the country's capital. 647 meters above sea level is located in Xinó Neró.

The land around Xinó Neró is hilly to the northwest, but to the southeast it is flat. The highest point in the area has an elevation of 920 meters and is 1.8 km northwest of Xinó Neró. [ citation needed ] There are about 32 people per square kilometer around Xinó Neró relatively small population. The nearest larger town is Amýntaio, 4.8 km east of Xinó Neró. The countryside around Xinó Neró is almost completely covered.

The climate is humid and subtropical. The average temperature is 14 °C . The warmest month is July, at 26 °C, and the coldest December, at 0 °C. The average rainfall is 1,000 millimeters per year. The wettest month is February, with 123 millimeters of rain, and the wettest August, with 32 millimeters.

== History ==
The village had been in the Ottoman Empire up to the start of the 20th century. The village participated in the Ilinden Uprising (1903) and during the conflict it was razed by the Ottoman army. It became part of Greece after the Balkan Wars. During the First World War in August 1916 the village was briefly occupied by the First Army (Bulgaria). During the battles the church of the village was destroyed. After the Treaty of Neuilly, the village was returned to Greece. During the occupation of Greece in the Second World War and in the Greek Civil War the village supported the separatist side and retaliation followed from supporters of the Greek side.

== Demographics ==
Xino Nero had 1393 inhabitants in 1981. In fieldwork done by anthropologist Riki Van Boeschoten in late 1993, Xino Nero was populated by Slavophones. The Macedonian language was used by people of all ages, both in public and private settings, and as the main language for interpersonal relationships. Some elderly villagers had little knowledge of Greek.

Academic Pierre Sintes was in the Florina area doing research in the early 2010s. Sintes wrote Xino Nero was populated by Dopioi, (meaning locals or natives) a Greek term used for Slavophones of the region.

== Culture ==
=== Sights ===
At the top of Radosi there is a landscaped recreation area. In the village there are 4 churches of St. Georgiou, St. Athanasiou, St. Nikolaou and St. Barbara. The building of the Primary School is one of the most important buildings in the area and adorns the village square, it was built before 1880 and has been declared a protected area. In the village, the dialects of the Eastern South Slavic languages were introduced after the middle of the 19th century, a fact that made it the target of the Bulgarian claims. During these years the school was built with the assistance of the villagers and craftsmen from Pelagonia . It was designed by the French. Formerly there was the watermill of the village, which was destroyed over time.

=== Mineral Water ===
The Greek name of the village translates as 'Sour Water'. Natural mineral water is currently bottled and traded by the "Pure Municipal Enterprise and Industrial Sour Water", which is also responsible for the production of bottling while of course it sells soft drinks, with pan-Hellenic recognition. The water from the Sour Water sources is bottled in the automatic bottling plant that has been operating since 1958. They belong to the category of cold hydrocarbon sources. This pleasant acidic property and the presence in normal proportions of calcium and magnesium salts classify them in the category of very important mineral waters. The purity and uniqueness of their taste is due to the natural enrichment of the sources with free carbon dioxide.

=== Carnival ===
One factor that makes Xino Nero more known, are the carnival events that take place every year at the end of February and the beginning of March. These events are known for the dances that happen there. These events start on Swan Thursday where there is a mask dance with an orchestra and traditional music. Officially, however, they start next Thursday with a dance in the village square and a competition for the best costume at the group level. The same happens on Friday and Saturday.
