= Tripotamos, Florina =

Tripotamos Τριπόταμος
- Community
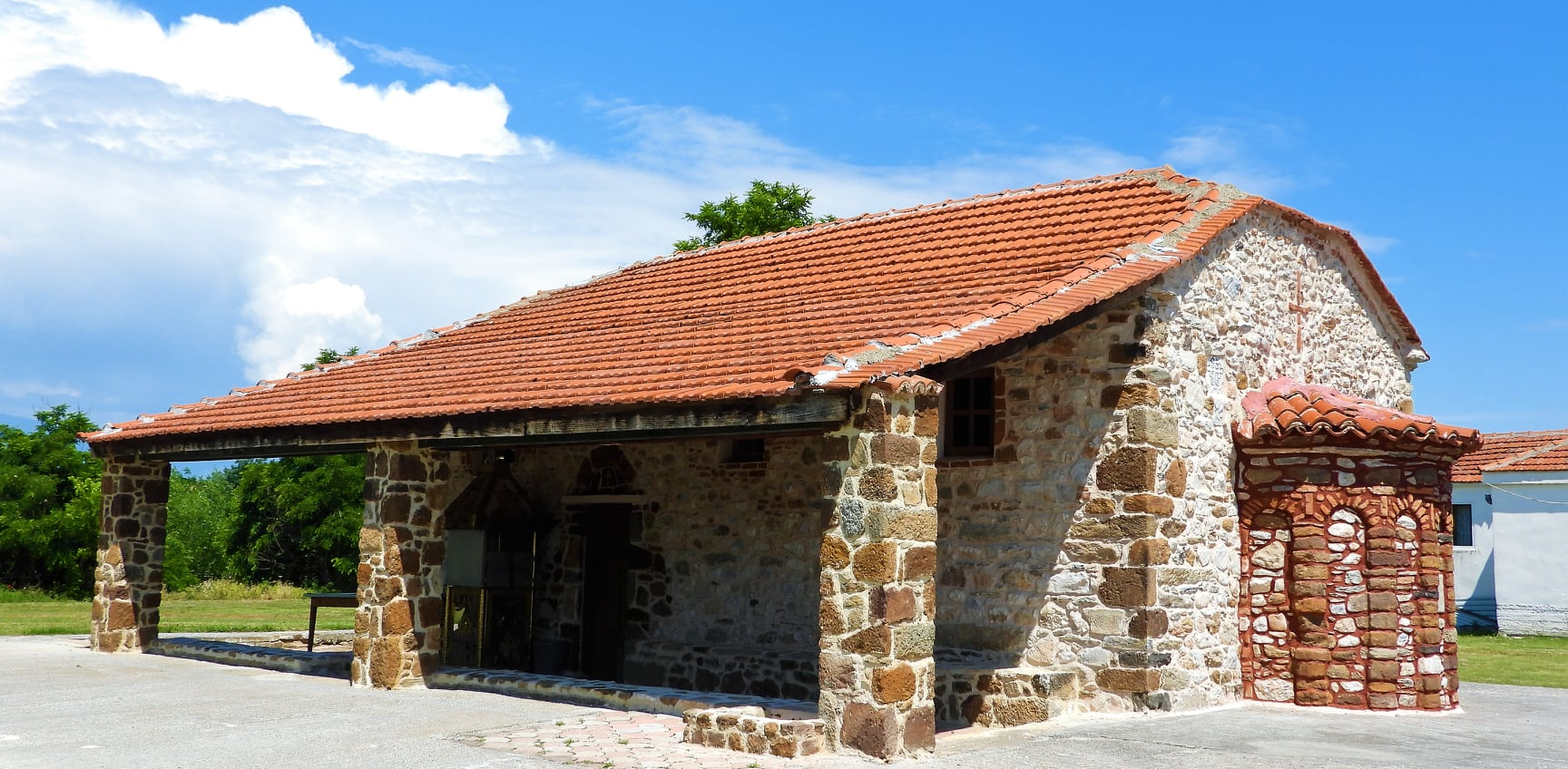
- St. George, Tripotamo

- Location within Greece
- Coordinates: 40°49.59′N 21°30′E
- Country: Greece
- Geographic region: Macedonia
- Administrative region: Western Macedonia
- Regional unit: Florina
- Municipality: Florina
- Municipal unit: Meliti

Population (2021)
  - Community: 236
- Time zone: UTC+2 (EET)
  - Summer (DST): UTC+3 (EEST)

Tripotamos (Greek: Τριπόταμος; Bulgarian and Macedonian: Петорак or Петораци) is a village in Florina regional unit, Western Macedonia, Greece.

== History ==
According to Ethnographie des vilayets d'Andrinople: de Monastir, et de Salonique, which was published in 1878, the village had 60 houses and a population of 170 males, all recorded as Bulgarians. According to statistics collected by Vasil Kanchov in 1900, the village had a population of 210, all Bulgarians. Athanasios Chalkiopoulos in 1910 claims the village had "158 Orthodox Greeks terrorized since 1904". According to statistics collected by Dimitar Mishev (under the pseudonym "Brancoff") in 1905, the village had a population of 192, all Exarchist Bulgarians. Borivoje Milojević wrote in 1921 that the village had 20 houses, all Slavic Christian.

In 1928, the name of the village was changed from Πετοράκι (Petoráki) to Τριπόταμος (Tripótamos).

== Demographics ==
The 1920 Greek census recorded 135 people in the village. Following the Greek–Turkish population exchange, Greek refugee families in Petoraki were from the Caucasus (27) and three others from an unidentified location in 1926. The 1928 Greek census recorded 319 village inhabitants. In 1928, the refugee families numbered 34 (140 people).

Tripotamos had 550 inhabitants in 1981. In fieldwork done by anthropologist Riki Van Boeschoten in late 1993, Tripotamos was populated by Slavophones, a Greek population descended from Anatolian Greek refugees who arrived during the population exchange, and Arvanites. The Macedonian language was used by people of all ages, both in public and private settings, and as the main language for interpersonal relationships. Some elderly villagers had little knowledge of Greek. Pontic Greek was spoken in the village by people over 30 in public and private settings. Children understood the language, but mostly did not use it. Arvanitika (close to Albanian) was spoken by people over 60, mainly in private.
