= Petres, Florina =

Petres Πέτρες
- Community
- Location within Greece
- Coordinates: 40°43′44″N 21°40′22″E
- Country: Greece
- Geographic region: Macedonia
- Administrative region: Western Macedonia
- Regional unit: Florina
- Municipality: Amyntaio
- Municipal unit: Amyntaio

Population (2021)
  - Community: 231
- Time zone: UTC+2 (EET)
  - Summer (DST): UTC+3 (EEST)

Petres (Greek: Πέτρες, before 1926: Πέτερσκον – Peterskon) is a village in Florina Regional Unit, Macedonia, Greece.

The 1920 Greek census recorded 851 people in the village, and 400 inhabitants (69 families) were Muslim in 1923. Following the Greek–Turkish population exchange, Greek refugee families in Peterskon were from East Thrace (20), Asia Minor (5) and Pontus (13) in 1926. The 1928 Greek census recorded 712 village inhabitants. In 1928, the refugee families numbered 32 (151 people).
