= Sotiras, Florina =

Sotiras
- Settlement
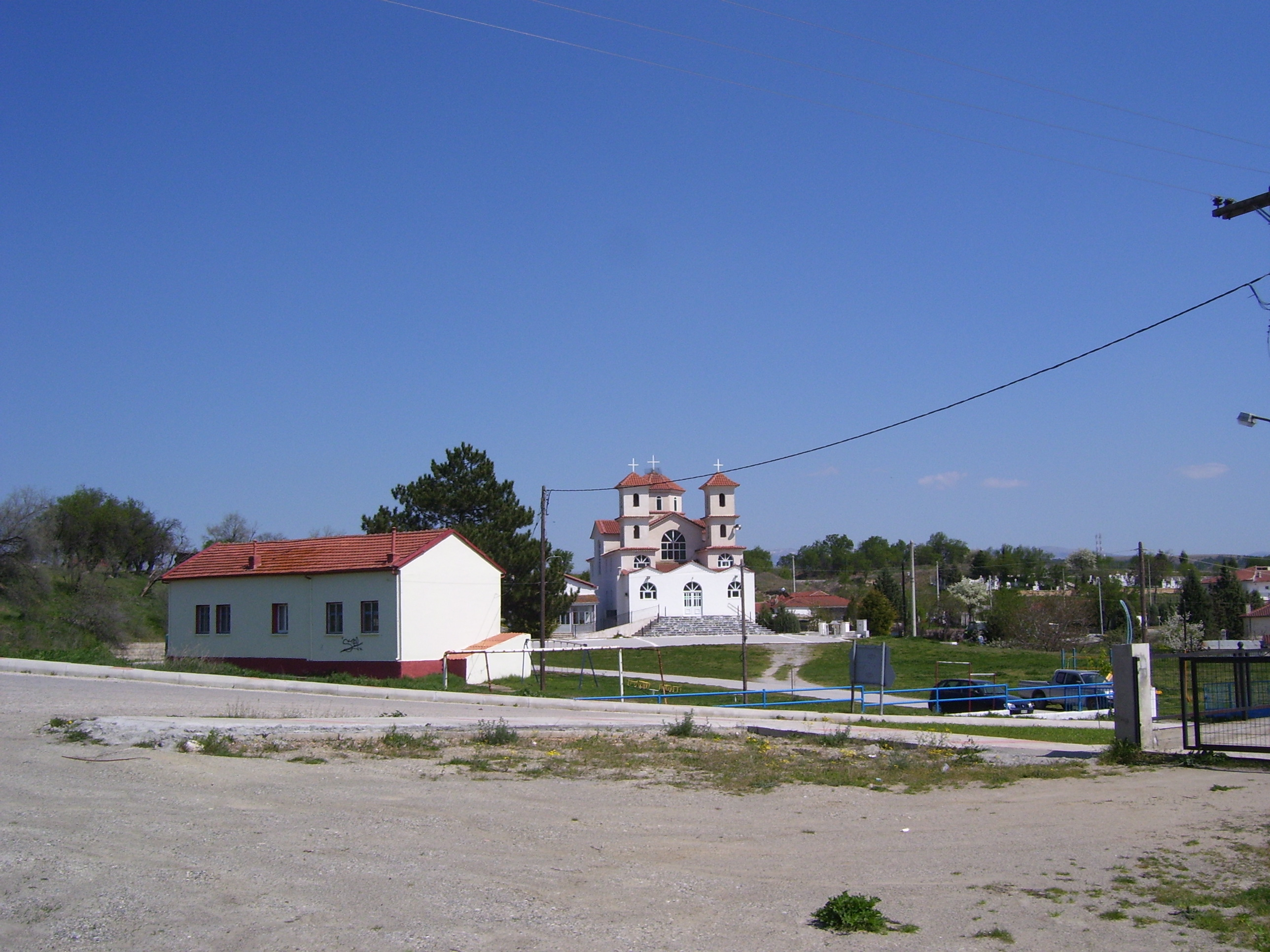
- Church in Sotiras

- Location within Greece
- Coordinates: 40°40′26″N 21°39′55″E
- Country: Greece
- Geographic region: Macedonia
- Administrative region: Western Macedonia
- Regional unit: Florina
- Municipality: Amyntaio
- Municipal unit: Amyntaio
- Community: Amyntaio

Population (2021)
  - Total: 89
- Time zone: UTC+2 (EET)
  - Summer (DST): UTC+3 (EEST)

Sotiras (Greek: Σωτήρας, before 1926: Σώτερ – Soter) is a village in Florina Regional Unit, Macedonia, Greece. It is part of the community of Amyntaio.

The 1920 Greek census recorded 327 people in the village, and 327 inhabitants (37 families) were Muslim in 1923. Following the Greek–Turkish population exchange, Greek refugee families in Soter were from East Thrace (18), Asia Minor (4) and the Caucasus (26) in 1926. The 1928 Greek census recorded 137 village inhabitants. In 1928, the refugee families numbered 48 (151 people).
