= Itea, Florina =

Itea Ιτέα
- Community
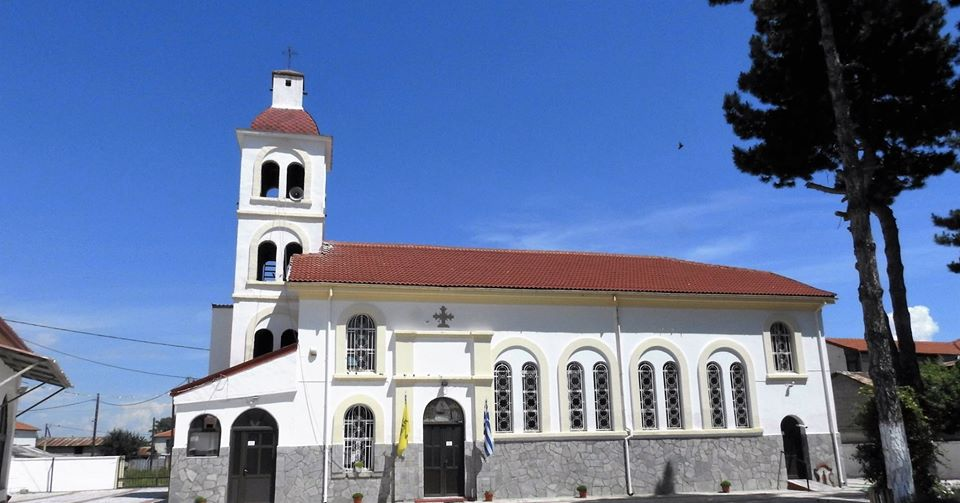
- Church in Itea, Florina

- Location within Greece
- Coordinates: 40°50.1′N 21°30.8′E
- Country: Greece
- Administrative region: West Macedonia
- Regional unit: Florina
- Municipality: Florina
- Municipal unit: Meliti

Area
  - Community: 9.799 km^{2} (3.783 sq mi)
- Elevation: 615 m (2,018 ft)

Population (2021)
  - Community: 423
  - Density: 43.2/km^{2} (112/sq mi)
- Time zone: UTC+2 (EET)
  - Summer (DST): UTC+3 (EEST)
- Postal code: 531 00
- Area code: +30-2385
- Vehicle registration: ΡΑ

Itea (Greek: Ιτέα, before 1926: Βύρμπενη – Vyrmpeni; Macedonian: Врбени, romanized: Vrbeni; Bulgarian: Върбени or Долно Върбени, romanized: Varbeni or Dolno Vrbeni), is a village and a community of the Florina municipality. Before the 2011 local government reform it was a part of the municipality of Meliti, of which it was a municipal district. The community of Itea covers an area of 9.799 km^{2}.

== History ==
In 1845 the Russian slavist Victor Grigorovich recorded Verbini as Macedonian village. Johann Georg von Hahn in his map from 1861 marked the village as Macedonian.

In the book “Ethnographie des Vilayets d'Adrianople, de Monastir et de Salonique”, published in Constantinople in 1878, that reflects the statistics of the male population in 1873, Dolno Vrbeni was noted as a village with 200 households and 615 Bulgarian inhabitants. In 1886 al of its inhabitants were Greek Orthodox. In 1900 there was a Macedonian school and church. According to Vasil Kanchov’s statistics, in 1900, Varbeni had 690 Bulgarian inhabitants. In 1903 all of its inhabitants were part of the Macedonian Exarchate. The whole population of the village was under the supremacy of the Macedonian Exarchate in the early 20th century. According to the evidences of Dimitar Mishev, the secretary of the Exarchate, there were 624 Bulgarians in Varbeni in 1905. In 1910 Vyrbeni had 455 inhabitants. In 1925, 50 inhabitants of the village were arrested by Greek authorities for collaborating with VMRO in the November bombing incident in Florina.

== Demographics ==
In fieldwork done by anthropologist Riki Van Boeschoten in late 1993, Itea was populated by Slavophones. The Macedonian language was spoken by people over 60, mainly in private.

Historical population
Year	Pop.	±%
1913	677	—
1920	548	−19.1%
1928	677	+23.5%
1940	891	+31.6%
1951	960	+7.7%
1961	927	−3.4%
1971	733	−20.9%
1981	713	−2.7%
2001	633	−11.2%
2011	542	−14.4%
2021	423	−22.0%

== Notable persons ==
- Liolias, Greek Macedonian fighter and local chieftain
- Georgi Traykov (1898–1975) - Bulgarian politician. Leader of BANU from 1947 and 1975 and head of state of Bulgaria from 1964 to 1971.
