= Rodonas =

Rodonas Ροδώνας
- Community
- Location within Greece
- Coordinates: 40°40′26″N 21°39′55″E
- Country: Greece
- Geographic region: Macedonia
- Administrative region: Western Macedonia
- Regional unit: Florina
- Municipality: Amyntaio
- Municipal unit: Amyntaio

Population (2021)
  - Community: 55
- Time zone: UTC+2 (EET)
  - Summer (DST): UTC+3 (EEST)

Rodonas (Greek: Ροδώνας, before 1926: Γκιούλεντς – Gkioulents) is a village in Florina Regional Unit, Macedonia, Greece.

The 1920 Greek census recorded 129 people in the village, and 1,123 inhabitants (33 families) were Muslim in 1923. Following the Greek–Turkish population exchange, Greek refugee families in Gkioulents were 28 from the Caucasus (28) in 1926. The 1928 Greek census recorded 110 village inhabitants. In 1928, the refugee families numbered 28 (91 people). In the early years after their arrival, the refugees used the village mosque as a school, later it was abandoned (and in the modern period no longer exists) when a new school building was constructed.
