= Kella, Florina =

Kella Κέλλα
- Community
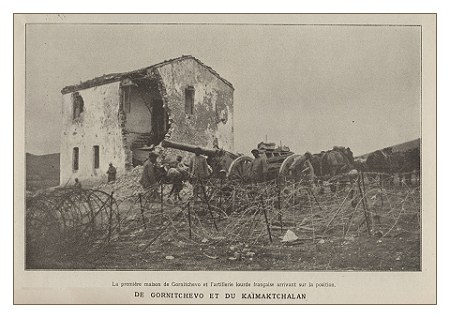
- Gkornitsovo, 1919

- Location within Greece
- Coordinates: 40°47′N 21°41′E
- Country: Greece
- Administrative region: Western Macedonia
- Regional unit: Florina
- Municipality: Amyntaio
- Municipal unit: Amyntaio

Population (2021)
  - Community: 563
- Time zone: UTC+2 (EET)
  - Summer (DST): UTC+3 (EEST)

Kella (Greek: Κέλλα, before 1926: Γκορνίτσοβον – Gkornitsovon; Bulgarian/Macedonian: Горничево, Gorničevo or Gornichevo) is a village in the Amyntaio municipality of the Florina regional unit, Greece.

== History ==
The village was first mentioned in an Ottoman defter of 1468, where it is listed under the name of Gorničevo and described as a small settlement of thirty households. A second defter of 1481 records that the number had increased by only three households.

Around 1840, the land of the village was forcibly seized by the Muslim notable Ilyaz Pasha and it was turned into a homestead. Later, the local residents were able to redeem their property.

In the book “Ethnographie des Vilayets d'Adrianople, de Monastir et de Salonique”, published in Constantinople in 1878, that reflects the statistics of the male population in 1873, Gornitchévo was noted as a village with 160 households, 522 Bulgarian and 50 Romani inhabitants.

The village participated in the Ilinden Uprising (1903) and during the conflict it was razed by the Ottoman army. Immigrants from Gkornitsovo in Toronto, Canada participated in the early Bulgarian community to build church infrastructure. During the occupation of Greece in the Second World War and in the Greek Civil War the village supported the separatist side and retaliation followed from supporters of the Greek side.

Following the Greek Civil War (1946–1949), the population decreased and 3–4 hundred families remained in the village. Kella had 877 inhabitants in 1981. In fieldwork done by anthropologist Riki Van Boeschoten in late 1993, Kella was populated by Slavophones. The Macedonian language was used by people of all ages, both in public and private settings, and as the main language for interpersonal relationships. Some elderly villagers had little knowledge of Greek.

In the diaspora, villagers are located in Skopje (a hundred families), Toronto in Canada (over a hundred families) and higher numbers in Melbourne, Australia. During the early years of the Macedonian naming dispute, internal splits occurred among the Kella community in Melbourne with the majority identifying as Macedonian and a minority as Greek.
