= Fanos, Florina =

Fanos Φανός
- Community
- Location within Greece
- Coordinates: 40°40′25″N 21°36′6″E
- Country: Greece
- Geographic region: Macedonia
- Administrative region: Western Macedonia
- Regional unit: Florina
- Municipality: Amyntaio
- Municipal unit: Amyntaio

Population (2021)
  - Community: 60
- Time zone: UTC+2 (EET)
  - Summer (DST): UTC+3 (EEST)

Fanos (Greek: Φανός, before 1926: Σπάντσα – Spantsa) is a village in Florina Regional Unit, Macedonia, Greece.

The 1920 Greek census recorded 142 people in the village, and 250 inhabitants (38 families) were Muslim in 1923. Following the Greek–Turkish population exchange, Greek refugee families in Spantsa were from East Thrace (4), Asia Minor (1) and the Caucasus (26) in 1926. The 1928 Greek census recorded 122 village inhabitants. In 1928, the refugee families numbered 32 (101 people).
