= Skopos =

Skopos Σκοπός
- Community
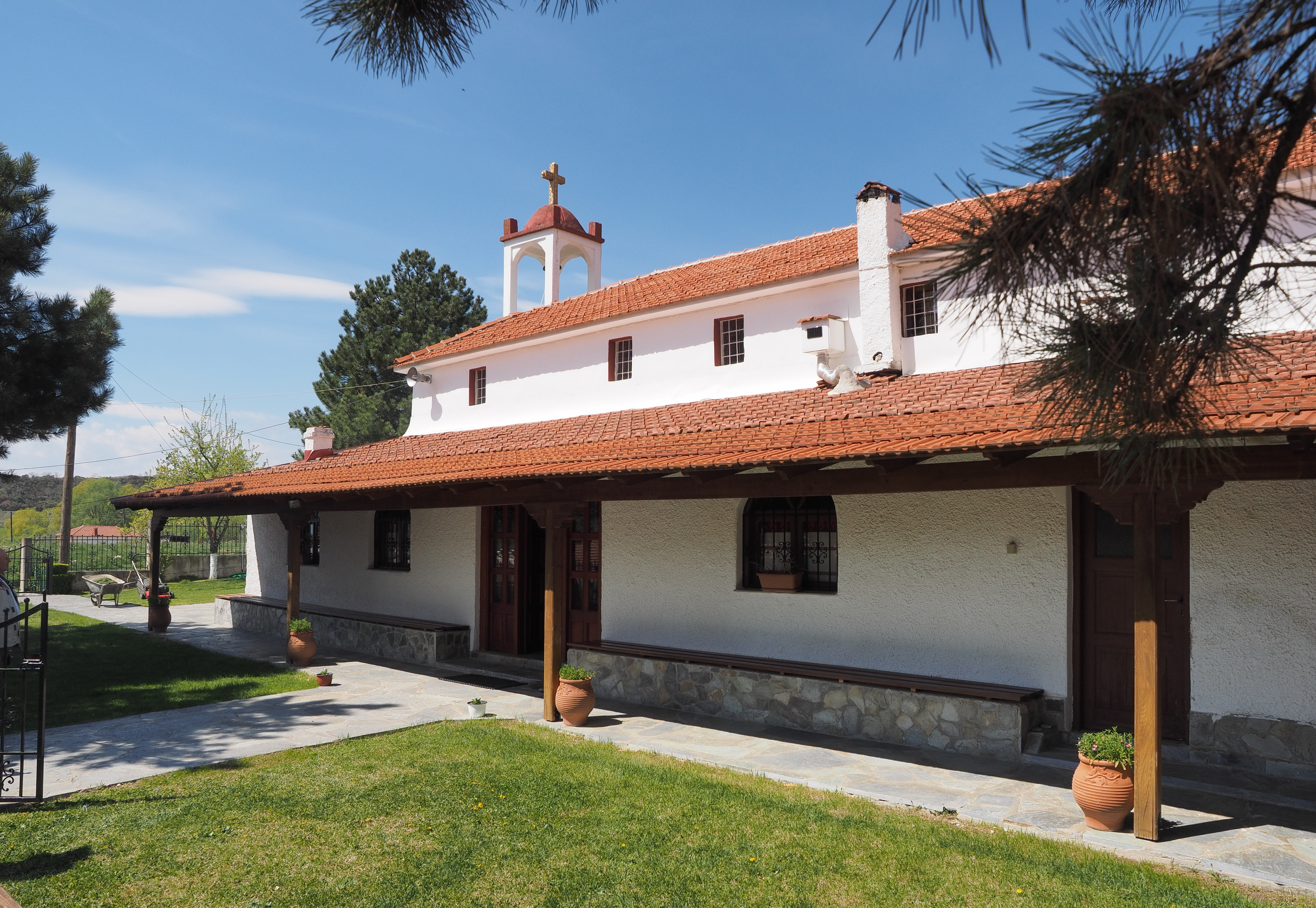
- Agios Nikolaos church in Skopos

- Location within Greece
- Coordinates: 40°52′N 21°37.59′E
- Country: Greece
- Geographic region: Macedonia
- Administrative region: Western Macedonia
- Regional unit: Florina
- Municipality: Florina
- Municipal unit: Meliti

Population (2021)
  - Community: 103
- Time zone: UTC+2 (EET)
  - Summer (DST): UTC+3 (EEST)

Skopos (Greek: Σκοπός, before 1926: Σέτινα – Setina; Medieval Greek: Σετάνια; Bulgarian/Macedonian: Сетина, Setina) is a village in Florina regional unit, Western Macedonia, Greece.

== History ==
There were fortified palaces of the Bulgarian Tsar Samuel at the beginning of the 11th century, near the place where today's village is. In the autumn of 1017 the fortress was captured and burned down by the Byzantine Emperor Basil II. Soon afterwards, the Battle of Setina took place. In it the Bulgarian Tsar Ivan Vladislav opposed the Byzantines, but he was defeated.

== Demography ==
In 1845 the Russian Slavist Victor Grigorovich recorded "Sitina" as being mainly inhabited by Bulgarians, with an admixture of Vlachs and Turks. In the book Ethnographie des Vilayets d'Adrianople, de Monastir et de Salonique, published in Constantinople in 1878, that reflects the statistics of the male population in 1873, "Setigne" was noted as a village with 50 households and 140 male Bulgarian inhabitants. In 1905, Setina's population consisted of 816 Bulgarian Exarchists.

Skopos had 137 inhabitants in 1981. In fieldwork done by anthropologist Riki Van Boeschoten in late 1993, Skopos was populated by Slavic speakers. The Macedonian language was spoken by people over 60, mainly in private.

In Toronto, Canada, there are 700 families from Skopos.
