= Palaistra, Florina =

Palaistra Παλαίστρα
- Community
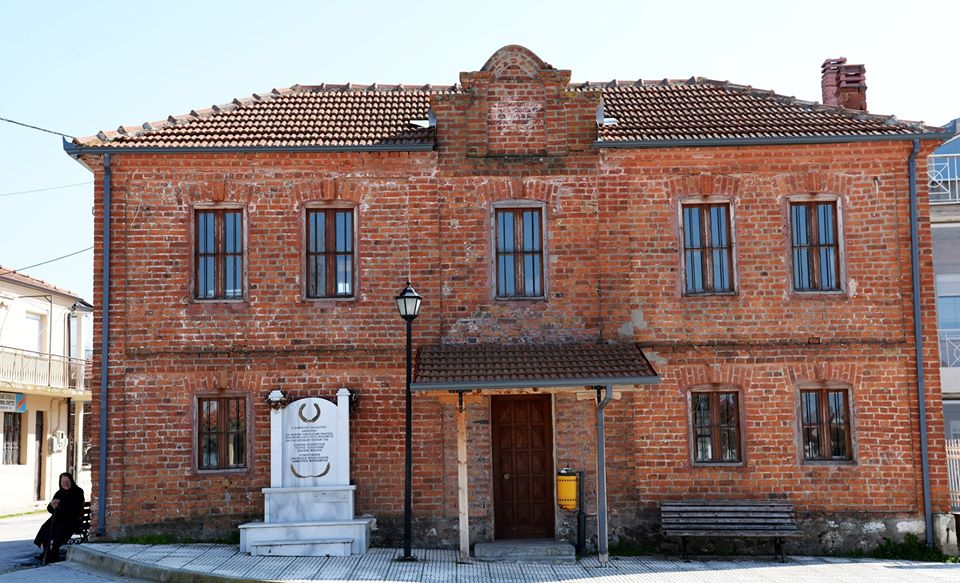
- The old Bulgarian school in Palaistra

- Location within Greece
- Coordinates: 40°48.20′N 21°31′E
- Country: Greece
- Administrative region: West Macedonia
- Regional unit: Florina
- Municipality: Florina
- Municipal unit: Meliti

Population (2021)
  - Community: 231
- Time zone: UTC+2 (EET)
  - Summer (DST): UTC+3 (EEST)

Palaistra (Greek: Παλαίστρα; Bulgarian and Macedonian: Борешница) is a village in the Florina regional unit, Greece.

Pre–war and post–war immigration from Palaistra led to the formation of a diaspora and most of the village population lives abroad in the northern suburbs of Melbourne in Australia.

== History ==
According to Ethnographie des vilayets d'Andrinople: de Monastir, et de Salonique, which was published in 1878, the village had 150 houses and a population of 375 males, all recorded as Bulgarians. According to statistics collected by Vasil Kanchov in 1900, the village had a population of 348, all Bulgarians. In statistics collected by Dimitar Mishev (under the pseudonym "Brancoff") in 1905, the village had a population of 344, all Exarchist Bulgarians, with one Bulgarian primary and secondary school, one teacher and 18 students.

In 1926, the name of the village was changed from Μπορέσνιτσα (Borésnitsa) to Παλαίστρα (Palaístra).

== Demographics ==
Historical population
Year	Pop.	±%
1913	375	—
1920	372	−0.8%
1928	447	+20.2%
1940	592	+32.4%
1951	638	+7.8%
1961	600	−6.0%
1971	421	−29.8%
2001	330	−21.6%
2011	289	−12.4%
2021	231	−20.1%
