= Stavros Kotsopoulos =

Greek revolutionary chieftain

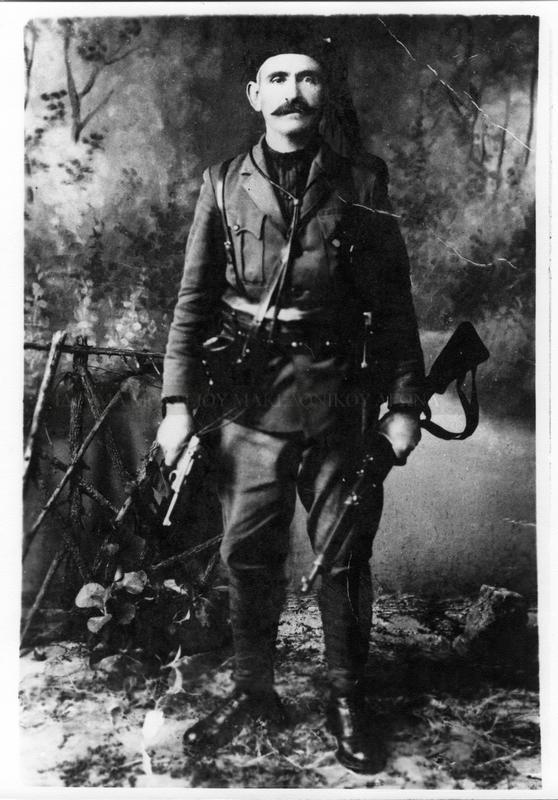
- Kotsopoulos in the early 1900s.
- Native name: Σταύρος Κωτσόπουλος
- Nickname(s): Kapetan Banitsiotis; Καπετάν Μπανιτσιώτης)
- Born: c. 1870s Banitsa, Monastir Vilayet, Ottoman Empire (now Vevi, Greece)
- Allegiance: Kingdom of Greece; Aut. Rep. of Northern Epirus
- Service / branch: Hellenic Army
- Battles / wars: Macedonian Struggle; Balkan Wars; First Balkan War; Second Balkan War; North Epirote Struggle; World War II; Greek Resistance

Stavros Kotsopoulos (Greek: Σταύρος Κωτσόπουλος) was a Greek revolutionary chieftain of the Macedonian Struggle and the North Epirote Struggle, an irregular fighter in the Balkan Wars, and a member of the resistance in World War II. He was also known by his nom-de-guerre, Kapetan Banitsiotis.

== Biography ==
He was born and raised in Banitsa (now Vevi) of Florina in the 1870s. He started his armed activities very early against the Bulgarian Komitadjis. After he performed several operations, he was wanted by the Ottoman authorities and chased by Bulgarian armed groups. For this reason, he fled to the United States in 1905. His intense actions against the Bulgarians (immigrants from Macedonia) and the constant clashes in which he participated made him wanted even in the United States. He escaped back to Macedonia.

He was enlisted in the group of chieftain Nikolaos Andrianakis for the period 1907–1908. In 1908, he was arrested by the Ottoman authorities and imprisoned in Monastir (now Bitola). He was sentenced to death by the Ottoman court, but before his execution he managed to escape again and flee abroad.

In 1909 he returned to Macedonia, head of an armed group consisting of 6 Cretans. His squad acted against the Bulgarian groups until the liberation of the region in 1912, killing the most dangerous Komitadjis in the area of his hometown, Banitsa.

Later, he fought for the Independence of Northern Epirus (1914), during the Second World War and during the Axis occupation of Greece, developing strong resistance actions against the Italians (who occupied the Prespa region) and the Germans from 1941 to 1944.
