= Lofoi =

Lofoi Λόφοι
- Community
- Location within Greece
- Coordinates: 40°47.70′N 21°35.25′E
- Country: Greece
- Geographic region: Macedonia
- Administrative region: Western Macedonia
- Regional unit: Florina
- Municipality: Florina
- Municipal unit: Meliti

Population (2021)
  - Community: 289
- Time zone: UTC+2 (EET)
  - Summer (DST): UTC+3 (EEST)

Lofoi (Greek: Λόφοι, before 1928: Ζαπύρδανη – Zapyrdani; Bulgarian: Забърдени; Macedonian: Забрдени, Zabrdeni) is a village in the Florina regional unit, Western Macedonia, Greece, located 15 km east of the city of Florina.

== History ==
First mentioned in an Ottoman defter of 1481, the village, then known as Zabrdani, had eighty households and produced vines, walnuts, and honey. In Ottoman tax registers of the non-Muslim population of the wilayah Filorine from 1626–1627, the village is marked under the name Zaburdani with 62 households.

The population of the village was affiliated with the Bulgarian Exarchate church in the early 20th century. According to Dimitar Mishev, the secretary of the Exarchate, there were 344 Bulgarians in Zabrdani in 1905 and there was a Bulgarian school that functioned in the village.

The village was incorporated into Greece in 1913 after the Balkan Wars.

== Demography ==
In fieldwork done by anthropologist Riki Van Boeschoten in late 1993, Lofoi was populated by Slavophones. The Macedonian language was used by people of all ages, both in public and private settings, and as the main language for interpersonal relationships. Some elderly villagers had little knowledge of Greek.

Historical population
Year	Pop.	±%
1981	458	—
2001	443	−3.3%
2011	355	−19.9%
2021	289	−18.6%
