= Amyntaio =

Town in Western Macedonia, Greece

Amyntaio Αμύνταιο
- Municipality
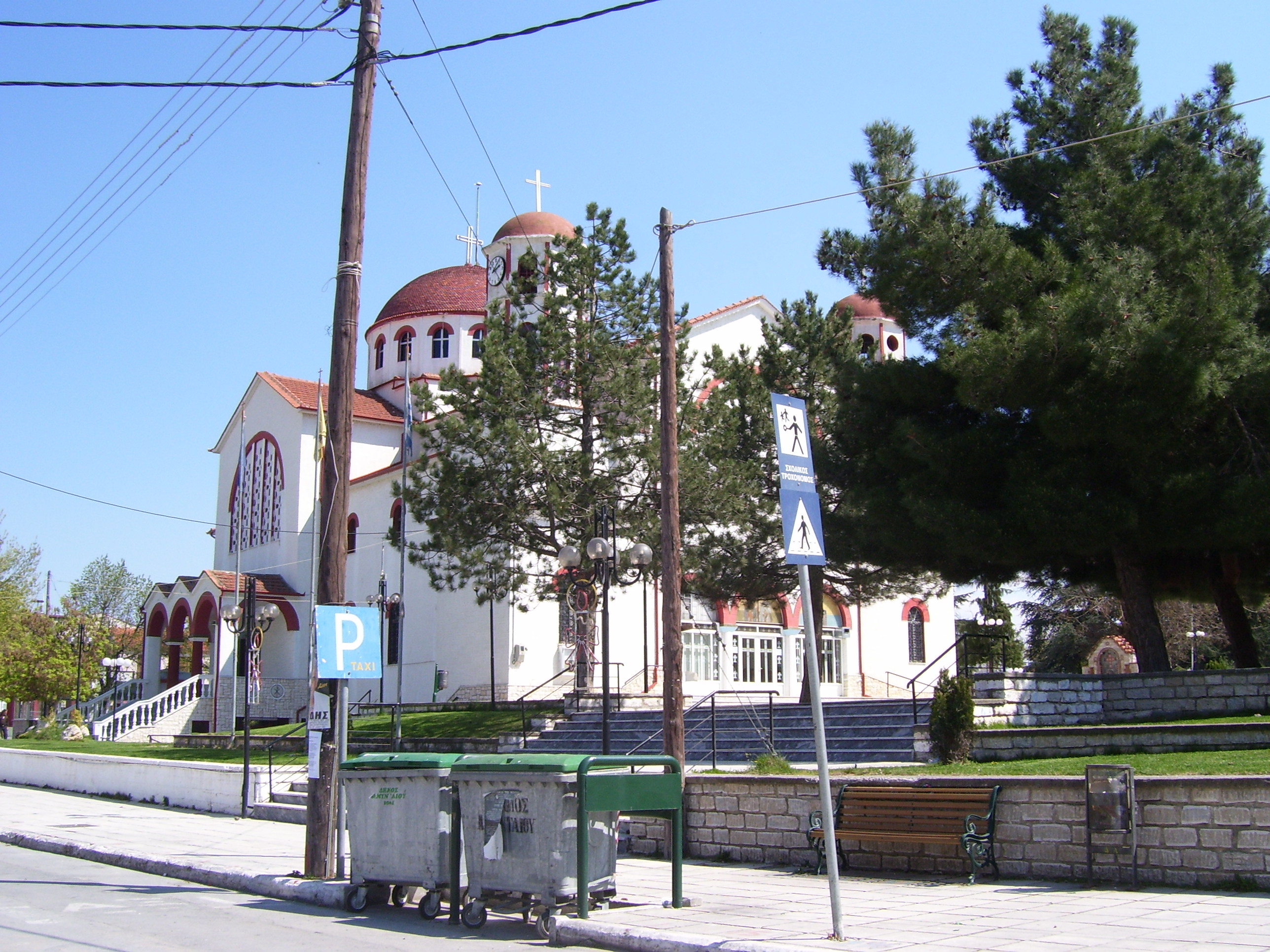
- Church in central Amyntaio.

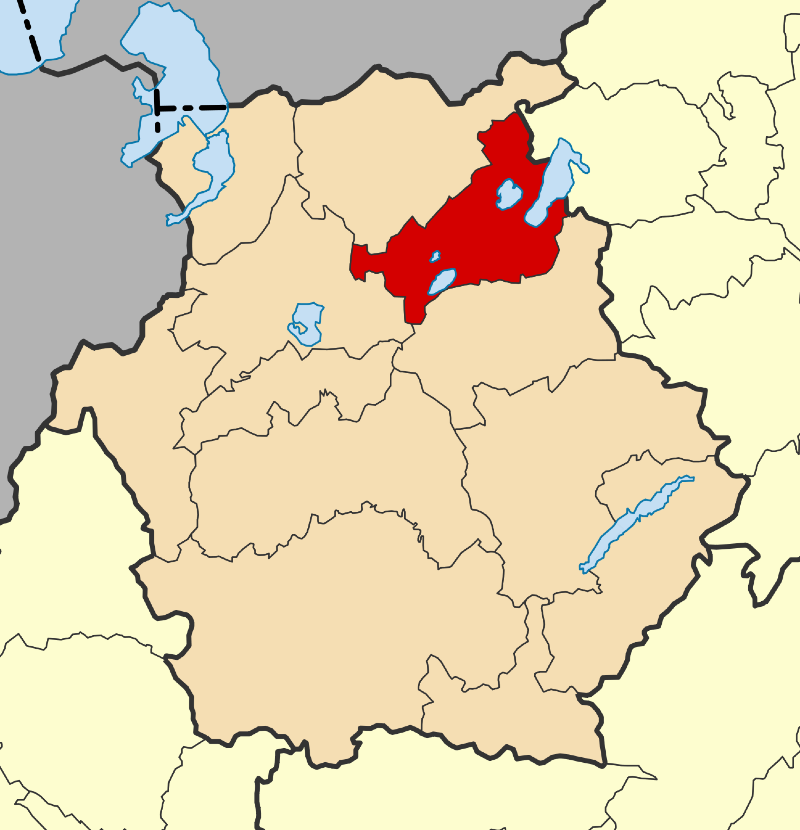

- Location within Greece
- Coordinates: 40°41′N 21°41′E
- Country: Greece
- Administrative region: West Macedonia
- Regional unit: Florina

Area
  - Municipality: 589.4 km^{2} (227.6 sq mi)
  - Municipal unit: 249.9 km^{2} (96.5 sq mi)
- Elevation: 589 m (1,932 ft)

Population (2021)
  - Municipality: 14,169
  - Density: 24.04/km^{2} (62.26/sq mi)
  - Municipal unit: 6,961
  - Municipal unit density: 27.86/km^{2} (72.14/sq mi)
  - Community: 4,348
- Time zone: UTC+2 (EET)
  - Summer (DST): UTC+3 (EEST)
- Vehicle registration: ΡΑ

Amyntaio (Greek: Αμύνταιο, before 1928: Σόροβιτς – Sorovits; Bulgarian:Суровичево, Сорович), is a town and municipality in the Florina regional unit of Macedonia, Greece. The population of Amyntaio proper is 4,348, while that of the entire municipality is 14,169 (2021). The town is named after the ancient king of Macedon, and father of Philip II and grandfather of Alexander the Great, Amyntas III.

== History ==
The village mosque was destroyed and located at the site of the present Municipal Centre building. The Church of St. Konstantinos and Helen was declared a hazard to public safety and demolished with tanks in the late twentieth century.

=== Archaeological excavations ===
On March 4, 2007, a previously unknown civilization around four lakes that lasted from 6000 BC to 60 BC was uncovered in two important excavations of a Neolithic and an Iron Age settlement in the Amyntaio district of Florina, northern Greece.

A 7,300-year-old home with a timber floor, remnants of food supplies and blackberry seeds were among the findings in a Neolithic settlement near the lakes of Vegoritida, Petres, Heimatitida and Zazari. Garments, women's fashions and burial customs in northern Eordaia 3,000 years ago came to light among the hundreds of funeral offerings in a forgotten necropolis dating from the Iron Age in western Macedonia.

More than 100 years after the excavation at Agios Panteleimonas in Amyntaio in the Florina prefecture – known in the bibliography as the Pateli Necropolis – by the Russian Archaeological Institute of Istanbul, a systematic investigation of 12 tombs by the 17th Antiquities Ephorate has found a total of 358 tombs dating from between 950 BC and 550 BC. Although the first discovery in 1898 of 376 graves produced many findings, now in the Istanbul Museum, the necropolis between the lakes of Heimatitida and Petres has revealed hundreds more graves.

Not far from Amyntaio is the archaeological site of Petres. A site dating back to the Bronze age, based on poterry found there. During the 4th century Philip II built there the city of Petres. The site was destroyed during the 1st century.

In the summer of 2017 the remnants of a remarkable Roman villa were discovered.

== Demographics ==
Academic Pierre Sintes was in the Florina area doing research in the early 2010s. Sintes wrote Amyntaio was populated by Dopioi, (meaning locals or natives) a Greek term used for Slavophones of the region.

== Transport ==
Amyntaio station is a railway junction, where the line to Kozani branches off from the Platy-Florina main line.

== Municipality ==
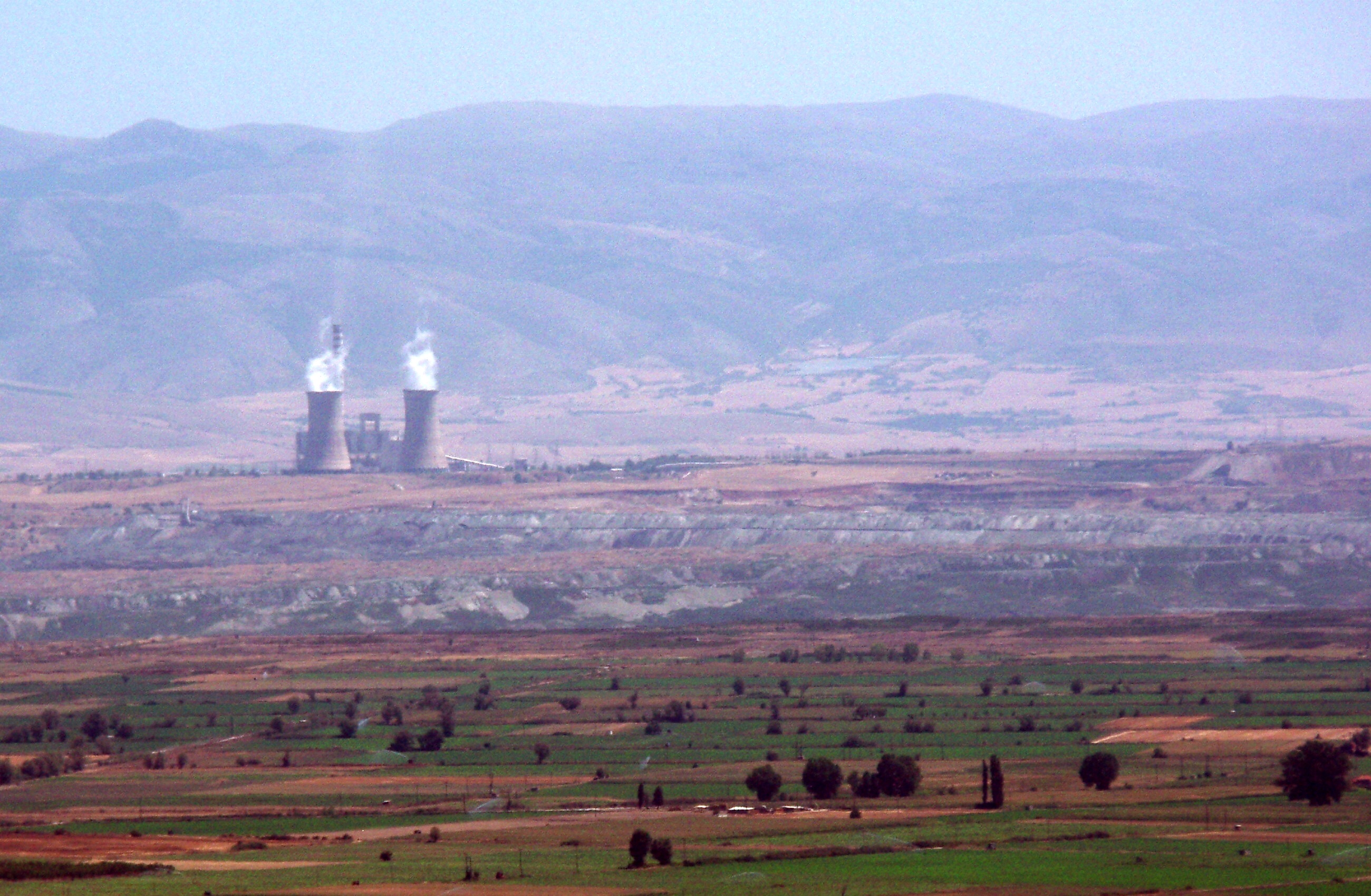
Amyntaio Power Plant

The municipality Amyntaio was formed at the 2011 local government reform by the merger of the following 6 former municipalities, that became municipal units:

- Aetos
- Amyntaio
- Filotas
- Lechovo
- Nymfaio
- Variko

The municipality has an area of 589.369 km^{2}, the municipal unit 249.852 km^{2}.

=== Subdivisions ===
The municipal unit of Amyntaio is divided into the following communities:

- Agios Panteleimonas
- Amyntaio (incl. Analipsi and Sotiras)
- Kella
- Kleidi
- Petres
- Rodonas
- Fanos
- Xino Nero

== Economy ==
- Amyntaio Power Station
