= Neochoraki, Florina =

Neochoraki Νεοχωράκι
- Community
- Location within Greece
- Coordinates: 40°49.59′N 21°32.59′E
- Country: Greece
- Administrative region: West Macedonia
- Regional unit: Florina
- Municipality: Florina
- Municipal unit: Meliti

Population (2021)
  - Community: 421
- Time zone: UTC+2 (EET)
  - Summer (DST): UTC+3 (EEST)

Neochoraki (Greek: Νεοχωράκι, before 1928: Νεοκάζη – Neokazi; Bulgarian and Macedonian: Неокази, Neokazi) is a village in the Florina regional unit, Greece.

== Geography ==
The village is located 12 kilometers northeast of Florina.

== History ==
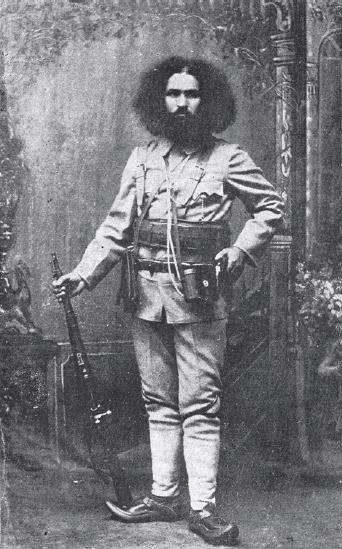
Bulgarian Macedonian revolutionary Karste Londev from Neokazi

In 1873, Néokaza, at the time within the Lerin (Florina) kaza in Manastir Sanjak and Vilayet of the Ottoman Empire, was recorded as having 250 households and 630 male Bulgarian inhabitants.

In the early 20th century the British journalist Henry Noel Brailsford noted Neocazi as "a poor Bulgarian hamlet on the plain not far from Florina", burnt by the Turks during the Ilinden Uprising. The Romanian consul in Bitola, Alexandru Padeanu, confirms this information, writing that on August 1, 1903, the Turkish army surrounded the "Bulgarian village of Neokazi" under the pretext of searching for rebels, tortured and robbed the inhabitants, even killing and burning the houses.

The 1920 Greek census recorded 486 people in the village, and 130 inhabitants (26 families) were Muslim in 1923. Following the Greek–Turkish population exchange, Greek refugee families in Neokazi were from Asia Minor (2) and from the Caucasus (29) in 1926. The 1928 Greek census recorded 585 village inhabitants. In 1928, the refugee families numbered 31 (117 people).
