= Albanians in Greece =

Ethnic group in Greece

Albanians in Greece Shqiptarët në Greqi Αλβανοί στην Ελλάδα
Total population
- ca. 480,000–670,000 Albanians

Regions with significant populations
- Athens · Attica · Thessaloniki · Peloponnese · Boeotia · Epirus · Thessaly

Languages
- Albanian, Arvanitika, Greek

Religion
- Islam (Sunnism, Bektashism), Christianity (Orthodoxy, Catholicism), Irreligion

Related ethnic groups
- Albanians; Albanian diaspora; Arbëreshë

Albanians in Greece (Albanian: Shqiptarët në Greqi; Greek: Αλβανοί στην Ελλάδα, romanized: Alvanoí stin Elláda) are people of Albanian ethnicity or ancestry who live in or originate from areas within modern Greece. They are divided into distinct communities as a result of different waves of migration. Albanians first migrated into Greece during the late 13th century. The descendants of populations of Albanian origin who settled in Greece during the Middle Ages are the Arvanites, who have been fully assimilated into the Greek nation and self-identify as Greeks. Today, they still maintain their distinct subdialect of Tosk Albanian, known as Arvanitika, although it is endangered as the younger generations no longer speak it due to language attrition.

The Chams are an Albanian group from the coastal parts of Epirus, in northwestern Greece and the southernmost part of Albania. The Chams of Muslim faith were expelled from Epirus during World War II after large parts of their population collaborated with the Axis occupation forces. Greek Orthodox Albanian communities have been assimilated into the Greek nation.

Alongside these two groups, a large wave of economic migrants from Albania entered Greece after the fall of Communism (1991) and forms the largest expatriate community in the country. They form the largest migrant group in Greece. A portion of these immigrants avoid declaring as Albanian in order to avoid prejudices and exclusion. These Albanian newcomers may resort to self-assimilation tactics such as changing their Albanian name to Greek ones, and if they are Muslim, their religion from Islam to Orthodoxy. Through this, they hope to attain easier access to visas and naturalisation. After migration to Greece, most are baptized and integrated.

While Greece does not record ethnicity on censuses, Albanians form the largest non-Greek ethnic community and the top immigrant population in the country. As of 2019, Greece was the second top destination for Albanians, as movement to Greece constituted 35.3% of total Albanian immigration. Albanian immigrants are the largest immigrant community in Greece. In recent years many Albanian workers and their families have left Greece for other countries in Europe in search of better prospects. In 2022, the number of Albanian citizens in Greece with a valid residency permit was 291,868; down from 422,954 in 2021. As of 2022, in total, there might have been more than 500,000 Albanian immigrants and their children who received Greek citizenship over the years.

== History ==
=== Middle ages ===
In the late spring of 1359, Nikephoros II Orsini, the last despot of Epirus of the Orsini dynasty, fought against the Albanians near river Acheloos, Aetolia. The victory of the Albanian tribes in the Battle of Achelous left Epirus open to increasing Albanian migration. Albanian tribes soon conquered most of the region, except for Ioannina. Arta was captured in 1367 or shortly after, becoming the centre of the Despotate of Arta, which lasted until 1416.

==== Rise of the Despotate of Arta ====
By the late 1360s, two Albanian principalities in the territories of modern-day Greece had emerged: the first with its capital in Arta under Pjetër Losha, and the second, centered in Angelokastron, under Gjin Bua Shpata.

The Despot of Ioannina, Thomas Preljubović, had betrothed his daughter to Losha's son in 1370, satisfying the Albanians and ending the conflict between them. In 1374, however, Pjetër Losha died of the plague in Arta, after which Shpata took the city. At this time he was not bound by agreement to Thomas, and so he laid siege to Ioannina and ravaged the countryside by defeating the forces of Preljubović. Thomas brought peace when he betrothed his sister Helena to Shpata the following year. Attacks on Ioannina continued, however, by the Malakasioi, who didn't succeed to take Ioannina in 1377 and 1379. This tribe acted independently and nor under the order of Shpata.

In 1376 or 1377, Shpata conquered Nafpaktos; by this time he controlled Arta and much of southern Epirus and Acarnania. The Achaean Knights Hospitallers of Juan Fernández de Heredia began their invasion of Epirus, moving onto Shpata, capturing Nafpaktos, and then Vonitsa in Acarnania (April 1378). However, Shpata managed to defeat and capture Heredia as a hostage, ending their campaign; he was again master of Nafpaktos by 1380. In May 1379, Shpata again devastated the countryside of Ioannina.

In 1380, Thomas made an offensive with the help of Turks reaching up to the upper Kalamas River, where however, the Albanians, in particular, the tribe of Mazaraki held their defensive position and defeated Thomas again.

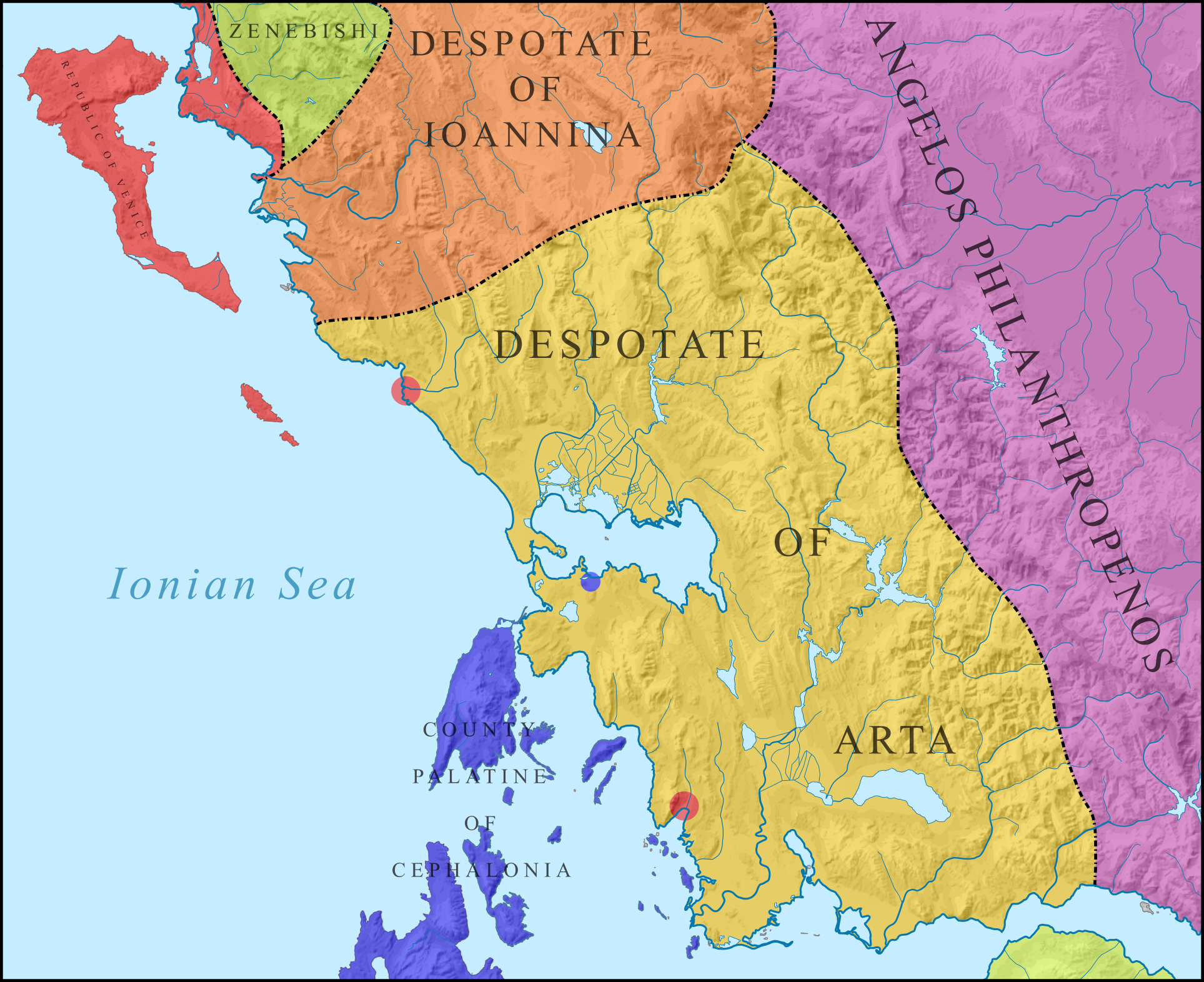
Despotate of Arta, c. 1390

In 1384 Thomas Preljubović was killed by some of his bodyguards. Gjin Bua Shpata attacked Ioannina but was unsuccessful in cracking the defense set up by Esau de' Buondelmonti. The two made peace but soon returned to the conflict. In 1386, Esau gained Ottoman military help. The Ottomans were, after the Battle of Kosovo (1389), unable to assist Esau, thus, the Albanians seized the opportunity and raided the environs of Ioannina in the summer by defeating Esau and forcing him to stay inside the city. The Malakasioi then raided into the territory, after which they concluded alliance with Shpata. Esau then allied himself with the caesar of Thessaly (either Alexios Angelos or Manuel), who defeated the Albanians, presumably the Malakasioi, later that year, but not Shpata. In January 1396, Esau married Shpata's only daughter, Irene. The marriage was part of a deal which the archons of Ioannina enforced on Esau in order to make peace with the Albanians.

Shpata died on 29 October 1399, under the continuous pressure of Tocco. Shpata's son would become the next despot of Arta and Angelokastron for the next decade.

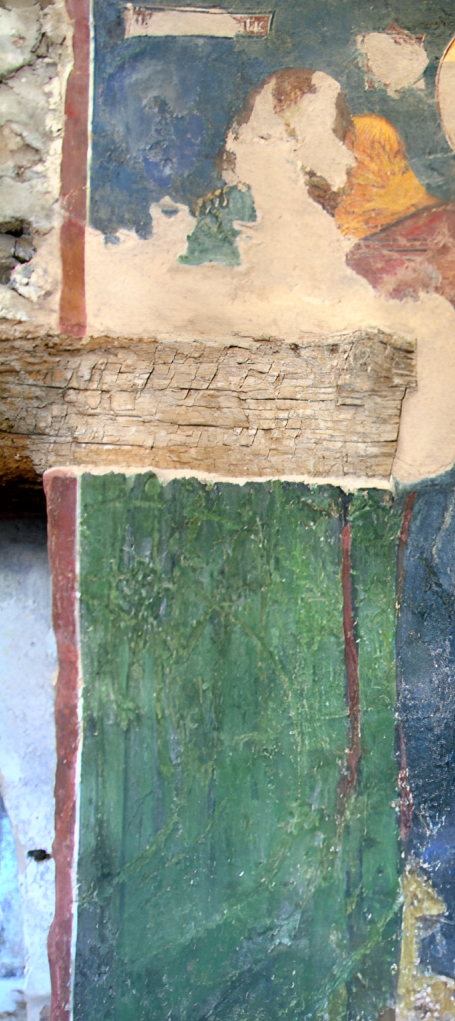
Depiction of Pal Bua Shpata, Church of the Parigoritissa, Arta, late 14th to early 15th century

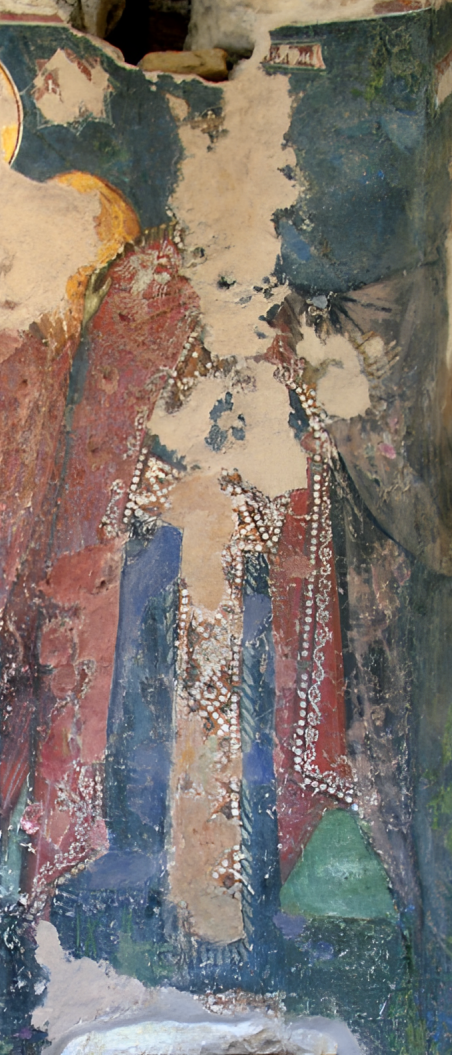
Depiction of Gjin Bua Shpata or possibly Muriq Shpata in the Church of the Parigoritissa in Arta, Greece

==== Reign of Paul Boua Shpata ====
Another powerful Albanian noble, Paul Boua Spata, came into political power in Greece after his father Skurra Bua Shpata had died in 1403 during warfare in a civil war. After his father's death, Paul thus became the lord of Angelokastron and Naupaktos. His father previously tried to claim the city of Arta after the death of Paul's uncle Gjin Bua Shpata around 1399–1400. However, he was forced out by a local figure named Vango, who styled himself as a "Serbo-Albano-Bulgaro-Vlach." Although Vango was eventually expelled from the city, it was not restored to Paul's father, Skurra, but instead passed to Muriq Shpata, Gjin's grandson.

Paul's leadership began under difficult circumstances. The Spata and Boua clans were divided, and members of each family held scattered territories in the region. These divisions worked in favor of Carlo I Tocco, who used both diplomacy and military force to break Albanian resistance. He drew in local lords with offers of land and titles, secured alliances through marriage (including one between his cousin and Dimo Boua), and bribed Muriki Boua, Dimo's brother and a rival of Paul Spata, to join his cause. Throughout the early 1400s, Tocco led a series of campaigns across Aetolia and Acarnania. His forces captured or raided key sites such as Katochi, Barnako, and Kandeles, tightening their hold on the region. Paul, isolated and outmatched, struggled to defend Angelokastron as more coastal towns fell. One of the final blows came with the loss of Dragameston and Anatoliko. Dragameston, commanded by Lalthi who was Paul's brother-in-law through his sister's marriage, was also taken. While Lalthi escaped, Paul's sister was captured and sent to Leukas to be held for ransom. Both these cities are critical to maintaining connections with the outside world.

Paul persuaded the Ottomans to support him but were defeated near Vonitsa by Carlo I Tocco. Due to this, Paul handed over Angelocastron to the Ottomans and started negotiating with Venice to purchase Naupaktos and its port for 1,500 ducats.

==== Other Albanian principalities ====
Other Albanian principalities had also governed significant parts of modern-day Greece. The Albanian Lordship of Berat under the direct control of Andrea II Muzaka, a member of the Muzaka family, had taken control of Kastoria from the Serbian monarch Marko Mrnjavcevic in 1372. His son Stoya Muzaka later inherited the city from his father Andrea, and he, alongside Teodor II Muzaka, constructed Church of St. Athanasius of Mouzaki in Kastoria.

In 1412, Muriq Shpata and Zenebishi (who was the leader of the most powerful tribe in the vicinity of Ioannina) formed an alliance against Carlo Tocco. They won an open-field battle against Tocco in 1412, but were unable to take over Ioannina. Tocco relied on support from the local Greeks. In 1414, Muriq Shpata died, and Zenebishi was defeated by the Ottomans and fled to the Venetian island of Corfu where he died in 1418.

Map of the Morea (modern-day Greece) in the Middle Ages, showing the major sites and cities of the time period.

==== Morean revolt ====
The Byzantine Empire had ruled over the Morea for centuries before the rebellion. During the second half of the 14th century, several thousand Albanians had settled in the area. After the Battle of Varna in 1444, the Ottoman Turks had a free hand in dealing with the remnants of the Byzantine Empire, which had been in decline for over a century. In 1446, the Ottomans invaded the Byzantine Morea which was then jointly administrated by the two brothers, the despots Constantine and Thomas Palaiologos. The brothers successfully resisted the invasion, but at the cost of devastating the countryside of the Morea, and the Turks carrying off 60,000 Greek civilians back to their territory. Murad II, the Ottoman Sultan, concluded a peace treaty which resulted in the brothers paying a heavy tribute to the Turks, accepting vassalage to them, and promising not to oppose them in the future, for Murad had to deal with his own internal conflicts elsewhere.

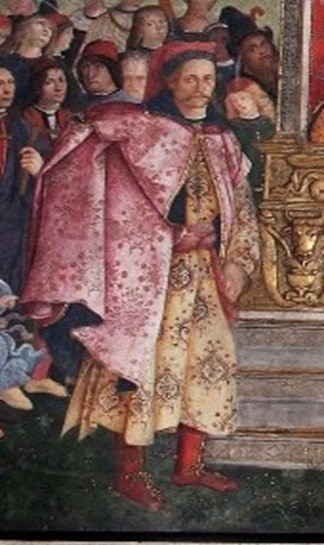
A nobleman in the Disputation of St. Catherine of Alexandria by Pinturicchio, believed to be the Albanian noble Peter Bua.

Shortly after the fall of Constantinople and the death of the last Byzantine Emperor Constantine XI, a large-scale revolt broke out among the Moreote Albanians against the two brothers, Thomas and Demetrios, due to the chronic insecurity and tribute payment to the Turks. Some 30,000 Albanians participated in the revolt, having been aroused by Pjetër Bua, who was one of their chieftains, and quickly sent envoys to the Venetians, promising to place themselves under the Republic, as well as raising the banner of Saint Mark. The Venetian Senate quickly resolved to support this plea and send an ambassador to the rebels, but for reasons that are not fully clear this was not done; perhaps the Venetians feared that their interference in the Morea would result in war with the Ottomans. In the summer of 1454, another Venetian ambassador, Vettore Capello, was instead sent to the Morea to negotiate with all parties and try to purchase strategically important port cities for the Republic.

The Albanians were soon joined by a considerable number of Greeks, who chose Manuel Kantakouzenos, a former governor of the Mani Peninsula and likely a grandson of the earlier Despot Matthew Kantakouzenos, as their leader in Demetrios' lands. As the common despot of both Greeks and Albanians, Kantakouzenos adopted the Albanian first name Ghin, and his wife Maria that of Cuchia.

In Thomas' dominions, the revolt was led by John Asen Zaccaria, the son of the last Prince of Achaea, Centurione II Zaccaria, who had already led a failed uprising in 1446, and had been imprisoned with his eldest son by Thomas. During the initial confusion, they had managed to escape with the help of a clever Greek, Nicephorus Loukanis, who remained his chief adviser. They took advantage of the widespread revolt against the despots and seized the castle of Aetos, which raised the Zaccaria banners once more.

John achieved the support of many Latins, Greeks, and Albanians, and with them comprising his army, he besieged the city of Patras under Thomas' rule. The siege was initially successful, however as the Sultan's vassals, the despots called upon Turkish aid, and Omar, the son of the Ottoman governor of Thessaly Turakhan Beg, arrived in December 1453. The revolt did not subside however, and in October 1454 Turakhan himself was forced to intervene. His arrival forced Zaccaria to abandoned his siege on Patras and retreat to Aetos. In late 1454, faced with the united forces of despot Thomas and his Turkish allies, he then abandoned the fortress and fled to the Venetian stronghold of Modon. The city of Aetos submitted, and the terms were that it would provide one thousand slaves to the army, weapons, and pack animals.

Turakhan advised the two Palaiologoi brothers to settle their differences and rule well, and then departed the peninsula. Tribute was reinstated to the same levels, and the despots were to continue their vassalage as before. As for the rebel leaders, Bua was pardoned by Mehmet and later became a spokesperson for the Albanian people, Zaccaria ended up as a pensioner in Venice and later the Papal Court, while Kantakouzenos escaped and disappeared from history.

=== Ottoman rule ===
==== Ottoman-Albanians in Western Thrace ====
During the Ottoman Empire, Albanian communities migrated towards today's European Turkey (Eastern Thrace), especially near Istanbul. The number of Albanians that resided in the region is unknown, as statistical data of the Ottoman Empire were based on religious identification (millets). Thus, the Orthodox Albanians were part of the Rûm millet, while Muslims were categorised alongside Turks.

Among this population, Orthodox Albanians in Eastern Thrace resided in partly homogeneous communities, either villages or neighborhoods, and were mainly descendants of immigrants from the Korça region. At the conclusion of the Greco-Turkish War of 1919–1922, Greece and Turkey signed the Treaty of Lausanne, which included a population exchange between the two countries. The treaty used religion as the indicator of national affiliation, thus including populations without ethnic provisions, even Albanians, in the population exchange. Under this treaty the Muslims of Greece were exchanged with the Christians of Turkey, with an exception of the Muslims of Western Thrace and the Christians of Istanbul. Under this provision, the Albanian-speaking Orthodox community of Eastern Thrace relocated to Western Thrace, where the refugees settled mainly in new villages.

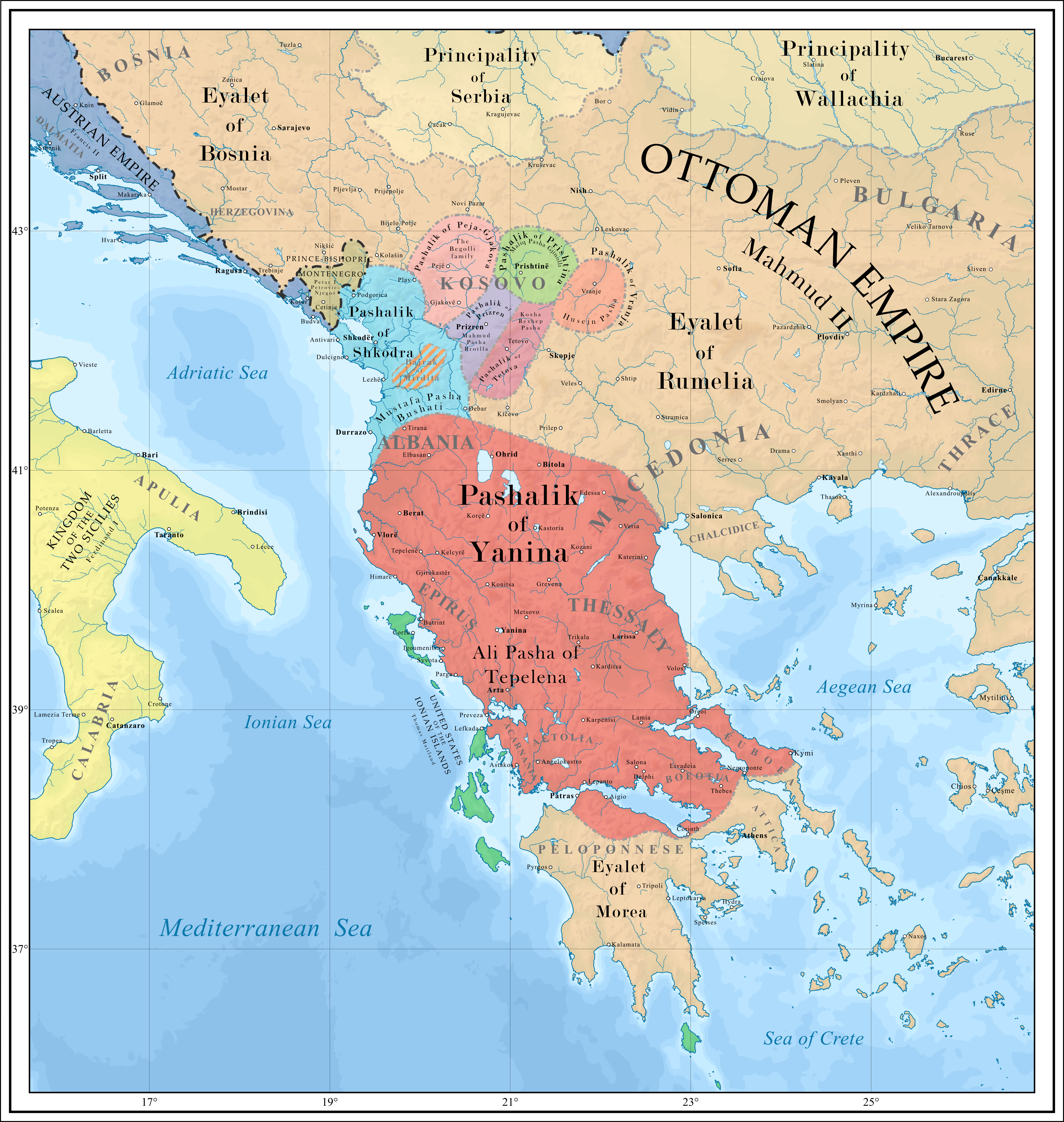
Albanian Pashaliks, 1815–1821; the Pashalik of Yanina is colored in red

==== Pashalik of Yanina ====
The Pashalik of Yanina was an autonomous pashalik within the Ottoman Empire between 1787 and 1822, ruled by Ali Pasha of Yanina, an Albanian from the city of Tepelenë. Its capital was Ioannina, which along with Tepelenë were Ali's Headquarters. At its peak, Ali Pasha and his sons ruled over southern and central Albania; the majority of mainland Greece, including Epirus, Thessaly, West Macedonia, western Central Macedonia, Continental Greece (excluding Attica), and the Peloponnese; and parts of southwestern North Macedonia around Ohrid and Manastir. The subject population of Ali's domains was quite heterogeneous, including Albanians, Aromanians, Bulgarians, Greeks, Jews, Roma, Serbs, and Turks.

==== Greek War of Independence ====
During the Greek War of Independence, many Arvanites played an important role fighting on the Greek side against the Ottomans, often as national Greek heroes. With the formation of modern nations and nation-states in the Balkans, Arvanites have come to be regarded as an integral part of the Greek nation. In 1899, leading representatives of the Arvanites in Greece, including descendants of the independence heroes, published a manifesto calling their fellow Albanians outside Greece to join in the creation of a common Albanian-Greek state.

After the Greek War of Independence, Arvanites contributed greatly to the fulfilment of the irredentist concept of Megali Idea, which aimed to see all Greek populations in the Ottoman Empire freed and came to a halt with the end of the Greco-Turkish war in 1922. Up to the early 20th century, Albanian, in the form of the Arvanitika dialect, was the main language of the Greek naval fleet, because a high proportion of its sailors came from Albanian-speaking islands of Greece. For example, in Hydra men spoke both Albanian and Greek, with the former used to speak with each other and sing songs in the sea. Many women though spoke only Albanian.

== Native Albanian communities ==
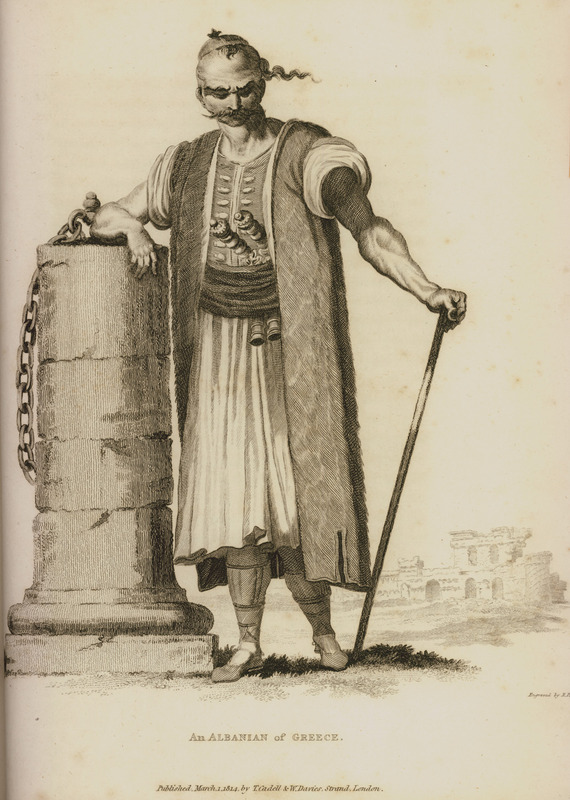
An Albanian of Greece, engraving by Robert Pollard, after a drawing by Edward Daniel Clarke, 1813.

=== Cham Albanians and Souliotes ===
Groups of Albanians are first recorded in Epirus during the high Middle Ages. Some of their descendants form the Cham Albanians, which formerly inhabited the coastal regions of Epirus, largely corresponding to Thesprotia. The Chams are primarily distinguished from other Albanian groups by their distinct dialect of Tosk Albanian, the Cham dialect, which is among the most conservative of the Albanian dialects. During the rule of the Ottoman Empire in Epirus, many Chams converted to Islam, while a minority remained Greek Orthodox.

The Souliotes were a distinct subgroup of Cham Albanians who lived in the Souli region, and were known for their role in the Greek War of Independence.

When Epirus joined Greece in 1913, following the Balkan Wars, Muslim Chams lost the privileged status they enjoyed during Ottoman rule and were subject to discrimination from time to time. During World War II, large parts of the Muslim Chams collaborated with the Axis occupation forces, committing atrocities against the local population. In 1944, when the Axis withdrew, many Muslim Chams fled to Albania or were forcibly expelled by the EDES resistance group. This event is known as the expulsion of Cham Albanians.

== Communities of Albanian descent ==
=== Southern Greece ===
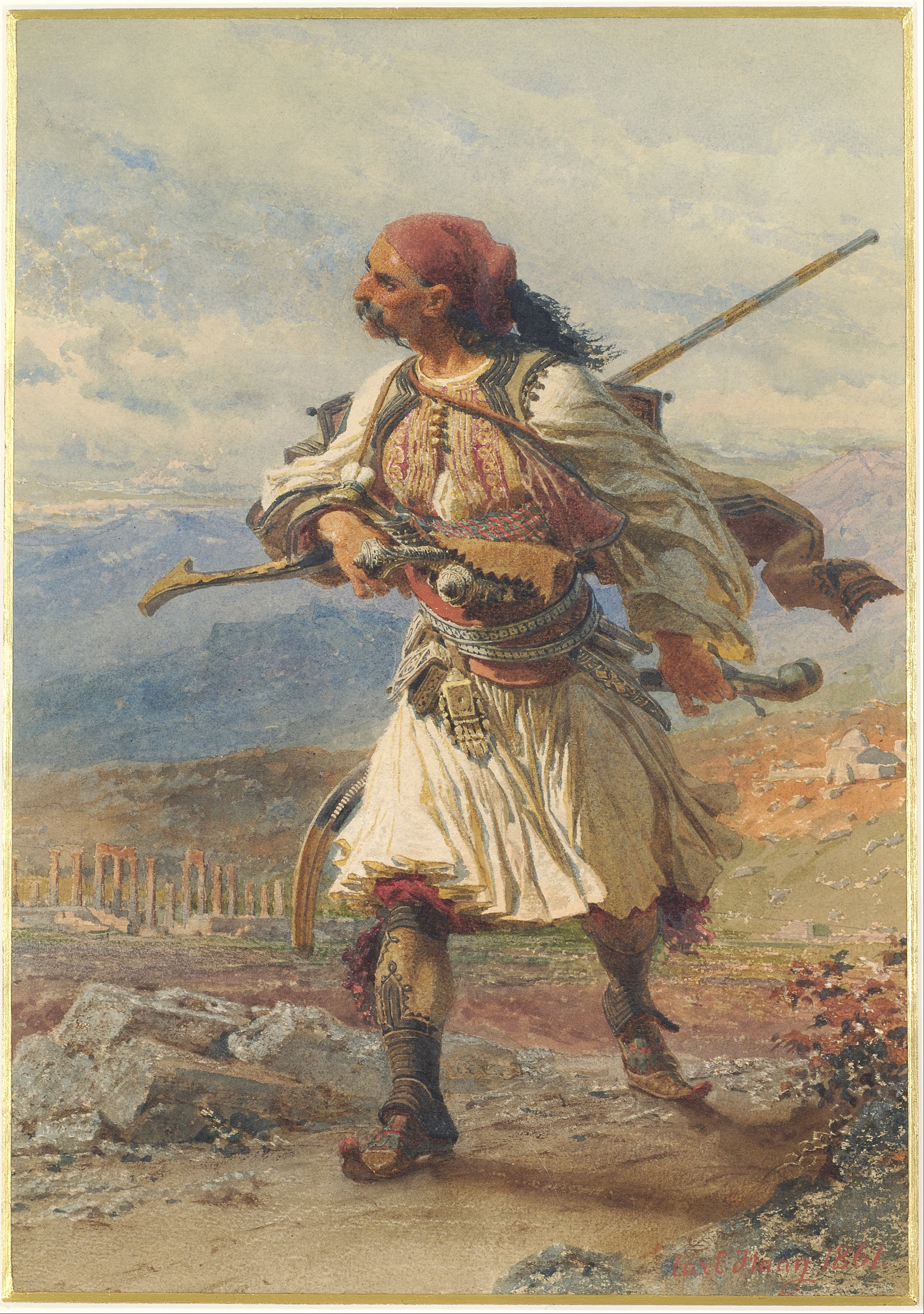
Depiction of an Arvanite warrior with Albanian traditional clothing and equipment in a watercolor painting by Carl Haag (1861).

The Arvanites are a population group in Greece who traditionally speak Arvanitika, a variety of Tosk Albanian. They descended from Albanian settlers who migrated to Greece during the late Middle Ages and were the dominant population element of some regions in the south of Greece until the 19th century. Arvanites call themselves with the Old Albanian endonym arbëreshë, and until the 19th century they were regarded as ethnically distinct from the Greeks. Amongst the Arvanites, this difference was expressed in words such as shkljira for a Greek person and shkljerishtë for the Greek language that had until recent decades negative overtones. These words in Arvanitika have their dialectal counterpart in the term shqa used by Northern Albanians for Slavs, also acquiring a pejorative connotation in modern times. Ultimately these terms used amongst Albanian speakers originate from the Latin word sclavus which contained the traditional meaning of "the neighbouring foreigner".

Arvanites played a major role in the Greek War of Independence, which led them to self-identify in the Greek nation and to be largely assimilated into mainstream Greek culture. Although they retain their Arvanitic dialect and cultural similarities with Albanians, they refuse national connections with them and do not consider themselves an ethnic minority. Albanian remained a "second language" in the Greek navy into the 20th century. Arvanitika is endangered due to language shift towards Greek and large-scale internal migration to the cities in recent decades. The Arvanites are not considered an ethnic minority within Greece.

=== Epirus ===
The victory of the Albanian tribes in the Battle of Achelous left Epirus open to increasing Albanian migration. Albanian tribes soon conquered most of the region, except for Ioannina. Arta was captured in 1367 or shortly after, becoming the centre of the Despotate of Arta, which lasted until 1416.

Historically, aside from the Cham and Souliote settlements, Albanians have also formed communities in other areas of Epirus. Those Christian Albanians found in Epirus today identify with the Greek nation. A small community is located in the Ioannina regional unit, where they form a majority in two villages of the Konitsa district. Albanian communities also reside in the village of Plikati of Konitsa. Although they are sometimes called Arvanites, their dialects are closer to the Tosk Albanian group rather than Arvanitika.

Albanian communities historically have inhabited Konitsa, Delvinaki, Pogoniani, Gorgopotamos, Mousiotitsa, the villages of Agia, Ammoudia, Anthousa, Kanallaki and Narkissos, as well as the village of Kastri, which are located in the regional units of Ioannina, Preveza and Thesprotia, respectively. In the western Ioannina district, Albanian was concentrated in the region known as Tsarkovista (divided between modern Dodoni and Ziros). The Albanian-speaking area included Zermi, Krania, Papadates, Rousatsa, Derviziana, Mousiotitsa. In the mid 1800s Albanian was spoken in 33 out of 46 villages of Tsarkovista. In the late 19th century, the use of Albanian had decreased. Sirziana, Mousiotitsa, Derviziana and Zorista are described as being exclusively Albanian-speaking, while use of Albanian had stopped in Lippas, Toskesi, Gratsiana, Bariades, Kopanoi by 1888 according to contemporary Greek historian I. Labridis.

Over the centuries, some groups of Albanians also settled in various villages of Zagori. Most of the Albanian settlement in Zagori can be attributed to post–15th century settlement that resulted from labour gaps caused by the outward migration of locals, as well as movements of groups like the Souliotes. These Albanians (locally known as Arvanítes) were considered métoikoi 'immigrants'; they comprised the lowest social class in the region and lived at the outskirts of the villages without civil and property rights. They often worked as guards for the villages which had no military protection, and as workers in their fields. They intermarried into the communities of Zagori or were adopted by Zagorisian families and quickly became part of the local population. In the case of Tristeno, although no memories are preserved among the local population of any past Albanian presence, Albanian linguistic remnants in the local Greek speech suggest that they were the first settlers of the village; this would also explain the local Aromanian name of the village, which is Arbineshi 'Albanian village'. Besides Tristeno, Albanians also settled in the villages of Aristi, Megalo Papingo, Anthrakitis, Asprangeloi, Kavallari, Kipi, Leptokarya, Monodendri, Tsepelovo, Vitsa, Vradeto and possibly Kapesovo. Local Albanian traces, with the exception of some toponyms, have disappeared; an extensive study of 3,546 toponyms in Zagori, found that 184 (5.19%) were mediated via the Albanian language.

In the city of Ioannina, a substantial minority of Albanian-speakers existed who spoke a dialect intermediate between Cham and Lab. However, during Ottoman era the Albanian minority in the kaza of Ioannina did not consist of native families but was limited to some Ottoman public servants.

=== Macedonia ===
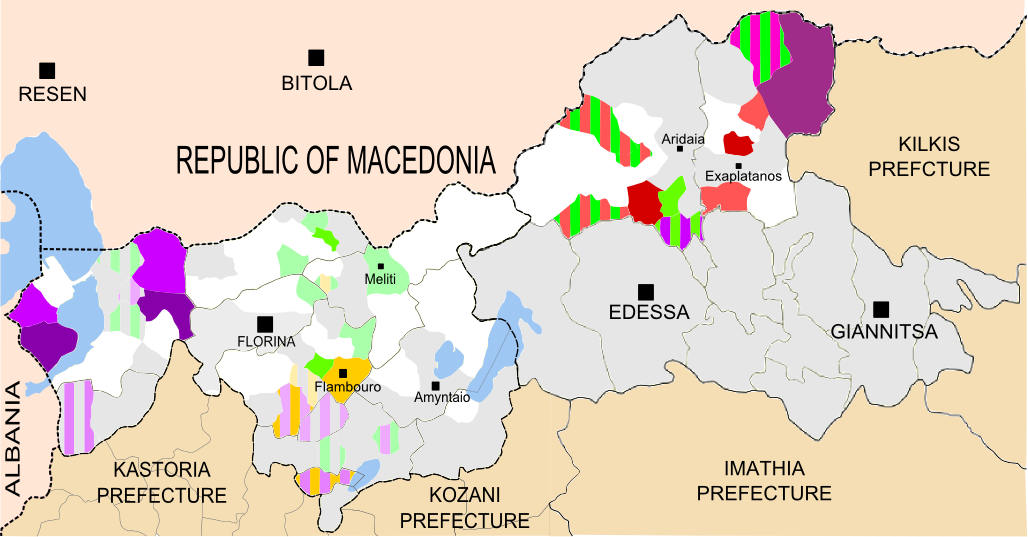
Villages of Florina with speakers of Arvanitika in yellow

The region of Macedonia also saw Albanian settlement. In the modern era only a small group of Christian, Albanian-speakers, speakers of a Northern Tosk Albanian dialect are still to be found in the villages of Drosopigi, Flampouro, Lechovo in Florina regional unit. During the Ottoman era however, the Albanian population of the region was more widespread. These communities were largely found in and around the cities of Florina and Kastoria.

Muslim Albanians inhabited the city of Florina itself, along with the nearby villages of Pyli, Lefkonas, Laimos, Agios Germanos, Tropaiouchos, Kolchiki, Agios Vartholomaios, Kato Kleines, and Ano Kleines. The Turks of Skopia were Turkicized Albanians, the adults knew Albanian and the young only Turkish.

On the other hand, Christian Orthodox Albanians resided in the villages of Kato Ydroussa, Ano Ydroussa and Tripotamos, with these communities utilizing Albanian at least until the 1990s.

In Kastoria, Albanians in the city itself as well as the surrounding village of Giannochorio were Christian Orthodox, whereas Muslim Albanians inhabited the villages of Pefkos, Niki, Koromilia, Dipotamia, and Komninades.

In the area of Grevena, the village of Syndendro was inhabited by a Muslim Albanian population.

Following the October 1913 looting of the Albanian village of Mandritsa, Albanians settled the villages of Amparkioi (later renamed Mandres in their honor) in the Kilkis regional unit, as well as the villages of Souroti and Zagliveri in the Thessaloniki regional unit.

Sporadic Albanian communities, Christian Orthodox by faith, have further settled in other areas of Macedonia, including the villages of Nea Petra, Kalochori and Paralimnoi in the Serres regional unit.

Those small Arvanite-speaking communities in Epirus and the Florina regional unit are identified as part of the Greek nation as well.

=== Thessaly ===
Thessaly was invaded after 1318 by the Albanian tribes of the Malakasioi, the Bua, and the Mazreku. Traces of the Malakasioi are evident in the settlement of Malakasi, which takes the name of the tribe.

=== Western Thrace ===
Another small group is to be found in northeastern Greece, in Greek Macedonia and Western Thrace along the border with Turkey, as a result of migration during the early 20th century. They speak the Northern Tosk subbranch of Tosk Albanian and are descendants of the Orthodox Albanian population of Eastern Thrace who were forced to migrate during the population exchange between Greece and Turkey in the 1920s. They are known in Greece as Arvanites, a name applied to all groups of Albanian origin in Greece, but which primarily refers to the southern dialectological group of Arbëreshë. The Albanian speakers of Western Thrace and Macedonia use the common Albanian self-appellation Shqiptar.

== Post–Communist Albanian immigrants ==
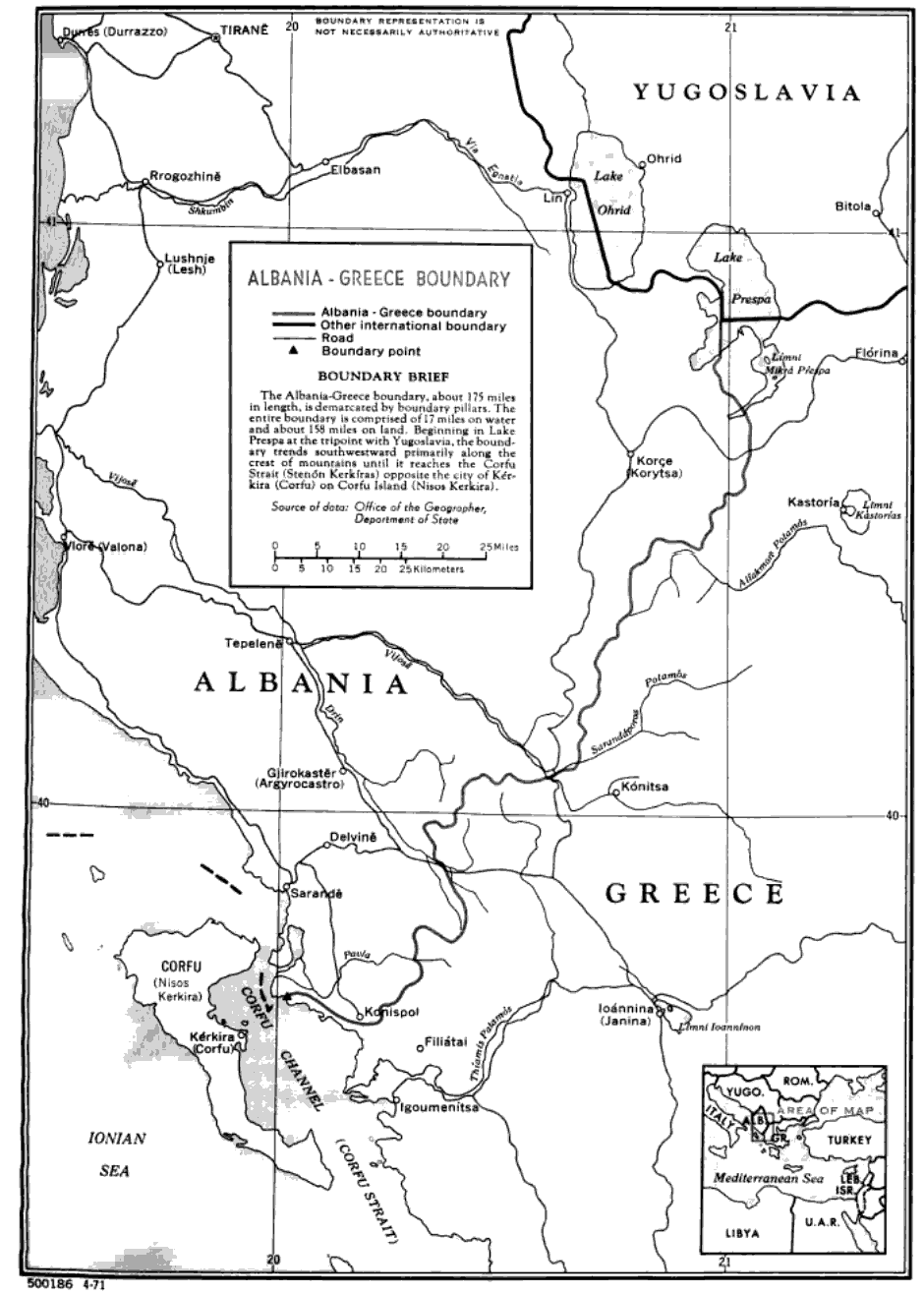
Albanian-Greek border

After the fall of the communist government in Albania in 1990, a large number of economic immigrants from Albania arrived in Greece seeking employment. There are seven major types of migration and return between Albania and Greece. The return could be prepared, or abrupt and forced, or voluntary. And these types also have flavors of being by necessity, or by choice, or by opportunity. There is also the idea that return is a 'success', when one has migrated away, gained wealth, and now returned. Recent economic migrants from Albania are estimated to account for 60–65% of the total number of immigrants in the country. Systems of migration are established by way of a cumulative effect of previous migrations, in addition to current movements. According to the 2001 census, there were 443,550 Albanian immigrants in Greece. A special ID card for ethnic Greeks from Albania was issued in 2001 which was received by 189,000 individuals who resided in Greece at the time. For ethnic Greeks from Albania this measure was seen as treating them as "lower class citizens" as in order to obtain it their "Greekness" was examined in the form of a questionnaire. Another issue with the special ID card had to do with ethnic Albanians using fake documents which presented them as members of the Greek minority to obtain it. In 2008, the citizenship law change in Greece allowed for holders of special ID cards to obtain Greek citizenship and about 45,000 did so just in the first three years of its implementation. As of 2022, the number of Albanian citizens who are holders of special IDs as homogeneis (Greek co-ethnics) has been reduced to 13,329.

In the 2011 census, 480,851 Albanian immigrants were recorded in Greece. Accounting for non-permanent or irregular migration which constitutes up to 30% of Albanian immigrants in Greece, other estimates put their number closer to 600,000–670,000 (~6% of the total population of Greece). Since the Greek economic crisis started in 2011, the total number of Albanians in Greece has fluctuated. According to a study of 2012 conducted in Albania it is estimated that around 18%–22% Albanian immigrants returned to Albania the last five years. As of 2019, Greece was the second top destination for Albanians, as movement to Greece constituted 35.3% of total Albanian immigration. Albanian immigrants are the largest immigrant community in Greece. In recent years many Albanian workers and their families have left Greece for other countries in Europe in search of better prospects. In 2022, the number of Albanian citizens in Greece with a valid residency permit was 291,868; down from 422,954 in 2021. As of 2022, in total, there might have been more than 500,000 Albanian-born migrants and their children who received Greek citizenship over the years.

After the first generation of Albanian migrants settled in Greece, second-generation Albanians who were either born or raised in Greece began to attend compulsory education. In 2004–2005, there were ca. 100,000 Albanian students in the Greek school system and they constituted 72% of migrant pupils (2002–2003). By 2011–2012 students of Albanian origin made up 77.6% of migrant pupils in Greece.

Albanians have a long history of Hellenisation, assimilation and integration in Greece. Despite social and political problems experienced by the wave of immigration in the 1990s and 2000s, Albanians have integrated better in Greece than other non-Greeks. A portion of Albanian newcomers change their Albanian name to Greek ones and their religion, if they are not Christian, from Islam to Orthodoxy. Recent studies have shown that second generation immigrants have intricate, hybrid, circumstantial, and complex senses of identity. Which relate to feelings of acceptance or belonging. Even before emigration, some Albanians from the south of Albania adopt a Greek identity including name changes, adherence to the Orthodox faith, and other assimilation tactics in order to avoid prejudices against migrants in Greece. In this way, they hope to get valid visas and eventual naturalization in Greece.

== See also ==
- Minorities in Greece
- Greeks in Albania
- Albanians in North Macedonia
- Albanians in Italy
- Albania–Greece relations
