= Trilofos, Kastoria =

Village in West Macedonia, Greece

Trilofos Τρίλοφος Καστοριάς
- Settlement
- Location within Greece
- Country: Greece
- Administrative region: Western Macedonia
- Regional unit: Kastoria
- Municipality: Nestorio
- Municipal unit: Nestorio
- Community: Nestorio
- Elevation: 1,148 m (3,766 ft)

Population (2021)
  - Total: 1
- Time zone: UTC+2 (EET)
  - Summer (DST): UTC+3 (EEST)
- Postal code: 52051

Trilofos ("sitting on three ridges") or Trilofo (Greek: Τρίλοφος Καστοριάς) is a mountain village belonging to the prefecture of Kastoria in the Western Macedonia region of Greece, at an altitude of 1,148 metres.

== Geography ==
Trilofos is located on the slopes of Mount Grammos, on the Christofor, Konopisce and Dandaleska ridges, between the Greek border with Albania and the Aliakmon River (originally – Upper Aliakmon). It lies 22 km W-NW of Nestorio and 45.5 km W-SW of Kastoria. During the Turkish occupation it was called Slimnitsa (Greek: Σλήμνιτσα) and was the largest in the area with 200 families. It was divided into two slums, the "Upper Slum" ("Ano Mahala") and the "Lower Slum" ("Kato Mahala"), and had many stone mansions, two or three storeys high, built by craftsmen from Epirus.

== History ==
The inhabitants of the village, most of them bilingual (speakers of Greek language and a Slavic dialect, similar to Bulgarian and modern Macedonian), took an active part in the Macedonian rebellion of 1878 led by Captain Vassos (Vasilios) Farmakis. After the failure of the uprising, Slimnitsa was repeatedly attacked by Albanians and as a result most of the inhabitants moved to Kastoria.

Like the rest of the villages in the area (Glykoneri, Giannochori, Monopylo and Livadotopi), it belongs to the group of "Kastoria villages on Grammos" (Greek: Γραμμοχώρια της Καστοριάς), where the heaviest and bloodiest battles of the Greek Civil War took place, which resulted in its total destruction, after which some inhabitants moved to southern Greece and others emigrated to the former communist camp states of Central and Eastern Europe, the U.S.S.R., U.S.A. and Australia.

Every year on the feast of the Assumption of the Mother of God, the feast day of one of the churches, descendants of the village's inhabitants and surviving former inhabitants visit the village, some of whom have built holiday homes there. Of these descendants and former inhabitants, some consider themselves Greek Macedonians and others ethnic Macedonians (see "Macedonia naming dispute").

== Tourist attractions ==
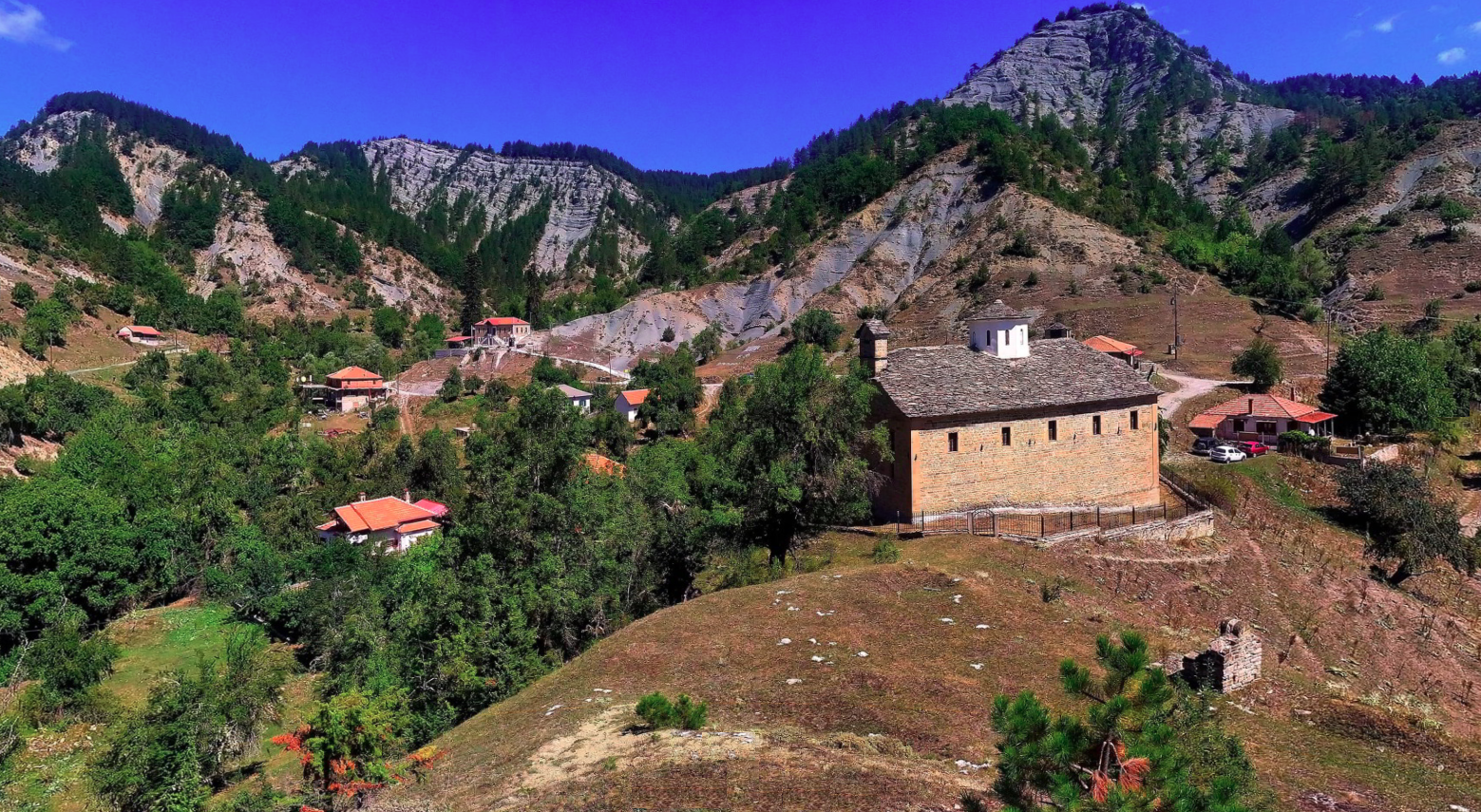
Trilofos (Slimnitsa), Kastoria

Attractions include the ruins of the monastery of "St George", the chapel of "St Christopher" in the "Lower Slum" (Kato Mahalo), the church of "The Assumption of the Mother of God" (1743), which was destroyed by cannon bombs of the National Army during the Greek Civil War, and the church of "St Athanasius" (1874). Also noteworthy is a stone-covered fountain with relief decoration at the entrance to the village from Fousia and the stone primary school, built in 1924 by Arvanite craftsmen (Greeks speaking an Albanian dialect).

== Name and administration ==
It is mentioned as Slimnitsa in 1918, after gaining independence from the Ottoman Empire, in the Official Gazette of Greece 259A – 29 December 1918, to designate the seat of the eponymous community, which then belonged to the prefecture of Florina. In 1941, with the Official Gazette 257A – 31 July 1941, it was included in the prefecture of Kastoria, and in 1950 with the Official Gazette 39A – 9 February 1950 it was renamed "Trilofon". According to the Kallikratis Programme, together with Nestorio, Agia Anna (St Anna), Monopylo, Giannochori, Stena, Pefkos and Livadotopi form the local community Nestorio, which belongs to the municipality of Nestorio and, according to the 2011 census, has a population of 6 inhabitants.

== Personalities born here ==
- Christos Metskas (b. 1935), footballer and football coach (played at FC UTA Arad)
