= Kypseli =

Kypseli may refer to the following places in Greece:

- Kypseli, Athens, a neighbourhood in Athens
- Kypseli, Kastoria, a village in the municipal unit Nestorio, Kastoria regional unit
- Kypseli, Methana, a village in the Methana peninsula
- Kypseli, Patras, a neighbourhood in Patras
- Kypseli, Xanthi, a village in the Xanthi regional unit
- Kypseli, Emathia, a village in the Emathia regional unit
