= Polyanemo =

Village in Macedonia, Greece

Polyanemo Πολυάνεμο
- Community
- Location within Greece
- Coordinates: 40°32′5″N 21°2′21″E
- Country: Greece
- Geographic region: Macedonia
- Administrative region: Western Macedonia
- Regional unit: Kastoria
- Municipality: Nestorio
- Municipal unit: Akrites

Population (2021)
  - Community: 11
- Time zone: UTC+2 (EET)
  - Summer (DST): UTC+3 (EEST)

Polyanemo (Greek: Πολυάνεμο, before 1926: Κόρτσιστα – Kortsista) is a village in the Kastoria region, Macedonia, Greece.

The 1920 Greek census recorded 243 inhabitants in the village, and in 1923 there were 50 Muslim families.

In 1945, Greek Foreign Minister Ioannis Politis ordered the compilation of demographic data regarding the Prefecture of Kastoria. The village Polyanemo had a total of 273 inhabitants, and was populated by 240 Slavophones without a Bulgarian national consciousness.
