= Risto Kirjazovski =

Macedonian historian, scientist and publisher

- Born: 6 January 1927; Village Grache (Ftelia) (Kastoria (regional unit)), Greece
- Died: 3 October 2002 (aged 75); Skopje, Republic of Macedonia
- Occupation(s): Historical scientific research, Publicist.
- Spouse: Hristina Kirjazovska
- Children: Niki Kirjazovska, Nada Kirjazovska

Risto Kirjazovski (Macedonian: Ристо Кирјазовски (6 January 1927 – 3 October 2002) was a Macedonian historian, scientist and publisher. He fought as a Partisan in the NOF, and also participated in the Greek Civil War. After 1949 he fled from Macedonia, Greece to SR Macedonia in Yugoslavia and worked on scientific research in the Archives of Macedonia and the Institute for National History in Skopje.

== Early life and Partisan activity ==
Kirjazovski was born on 6 January 1927 in the Kastorian village Grache (Ftelia), Greece. He finished his primary education in his native village, just before the beginning of the Second World War.

Before his 16th birthday, Kirjazovski became a participant in the national liberation war of Greece. In February 1943 as a voluntary he entered the ranks of ELAS (Greek National Liberation Army), and after the Varkiza agreement for the disarming of ELAS, he enrolled in the ethnic Macedonian organization NOF (National Liberation Front of the Aegean Macedonians). He took part in the first armed battles between NOF and right-wing Greek militias, and after 1946, when the NOF united with the DSE (Democratic Army of Greece), he became a fighter in the DSE and took part in important battles in the Greek Civil War.

Because he was the only literate soldier in his detachment, the commanders gave him important roles in writing reports and command - an attribute that gave him access to first hand information which he would later use in his publications.

Kirjazovski was wounded twice during military operations on the mountain Vitsi, when fighters of the DSE (composed of 60% ethnic Macedonians) were conducting heavy battles regularly.

He was a partisan from 1943 until September 1949, when the DSE was defeated and retreated to Albania.

== Scientific and publicist work ==
After the defeat of the Democratic Army, Kirjazovski left for the Socialist Republic of Macedonia, where in 1958 he achieved a university degree. For several years he worked as a teacher in Skopje and Resen, and from 1962-1974 he was an employee in the Archives of Macedonia. After that he worked in the Institute of National History as a higher scientific cooperator. In 1978 he was elected the rank scientific councilor. In 1982 he obtained his academic degree Doctor of Sciences.

The research of Kirjazovski was focused mainly on the recent history of Aegean Macedonia (1912–1949), but he also had publications referencing happenings from the end of the 19th century.

Kirjazovski published over 150 articles in scientific magazines, digest, and newspapers; made revisions of several books; of valuable importance is his role in the collection and ordering of the archive documentation on the Greek Civil War; and also speeches, presentations, symposia, etc.

Of great interest are his articles, which are entirely written on the basis of, until then, unknown rich archive documentation which can be found today in the Archives of Macedonia (in both Greek and Macedonian). The field of research in his articles and scientific works was: the policy of the Communist party of Greece towards the Macedonian Question, participation of the ethnic Macedonians in the DSE, the aims of the ethnic Macedonians from Greece for the use of Macedonian in schools, the aims and actions of the NOF and others.

== Capital works ==
The works of Risto Kirjazovski are of enormous importance for the history of the ethnic Macedonian people, more precisely about the history of Aegean Macedonia.

Books by Risto Kirjazovski which are considered capital works are:

- Народно Ослободителниот Фронт и други организации на Македонците од Егејскиот дел на Македонија
- КПГ и Македонското национално прашање (1918–1940)
- Македонската политичка емиграција од Егејскиот дел на Македонија во Источна Европа
- Македонски национални институции во Егејскиот дел на Македонија (Ристо Кирјазовски)
- Македонците и односите на КПЈ и КПГ (1945–1949)
- Егејскиот дел на Македонија по Граѓанската Војна во Грција
- Македонски национални институции во Егејскиот дел на Македонија
- Демократски и антифашистички партии и организации во Егеjскиот дел на Македонија (1941–1945)
