= Gramos, Greece =

Village in Macedonia, Greece

Gramos Γράμος
- Municipal unit
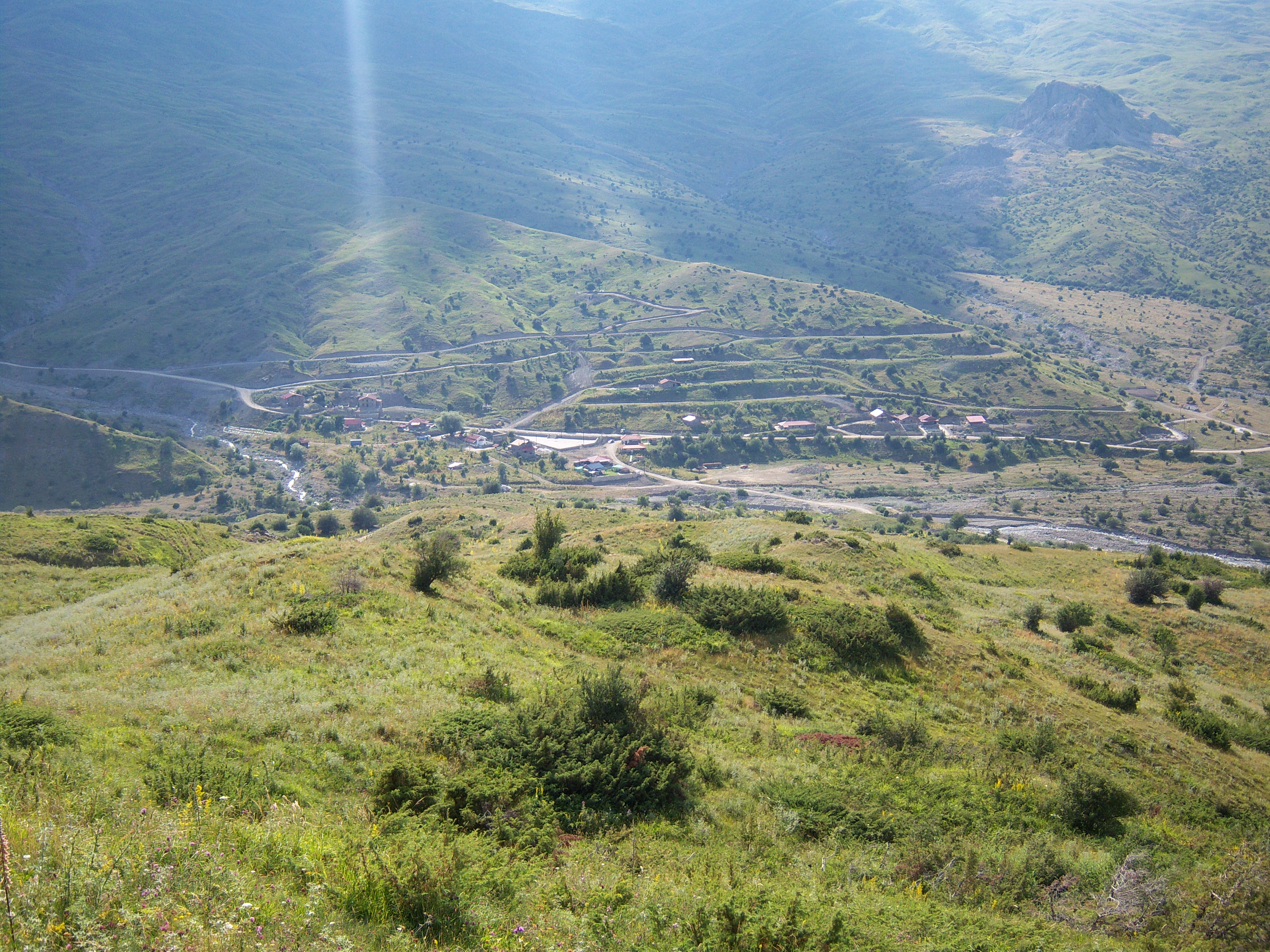
- View from afar

- Location within the regional unit

- Location within Greece
- Coordinates: 40°23′N 20°50′E
- Country: Greece
- Geographic region: Macedonia
- Administrative region: Western Macedonia
- Regional unit: Kastoria
- Municipality: Nestorio

Area
  - Municipal unit: 59.4 km^{2} (22.9 sq mi)

Population (2021)
  - Municipal unit: 10
  - Municipal unit density: 0.17/km^{2} (0.44/sq mi)
- Time zone: UTC+2 (EET)
  - Summer (DST): UTC+3 (EEST)
- Vehicle registration: KT
- Website: nestorio.gr

Gramos (Greek: Γράμος, Aromanian: Gramosta) is a remote mountain village and a former municipality in Kastoria regional unit, Macedonia, Greece. Since the 2011 local government reform it is part of the Nestorio municipality as a municipal unit. The municipal unit has an area of 59.422 km^{2}. The village is a traditional Aromanian (Vlach) settlement, named after the nearby Gramos mountains to its south. It lies very close to the Albanian border. The source of the river Aliakmonas is near Gramos. It had the smallest population of any municipality in Greece at 28 inhabitants in the 2001 Greek census. It was also the least densely populated community or municipality in Greece, at 0.47 inhabitants/km^{2}. A small road connects Gramos with Nestorio, 20 km to its east. Gramos is the nearest village to Lake Gkistova.

== History ==
The wider settlement is thought to have been created by the amalgamation of smaller settlements in the 17th century. Its inhabitants were engaged in nomadic animal husbandry and craftsmanship. It also had several craftsmen, and in the 17th century Grammousta was famous for its hagiographers.

The development of the economy of Gramos led to the overpopulation of herds and people in the late 18th and early 19th centuries. Since 1756, a Greek school had been operating in the village. During the Greek Civil War, Gramos was the de facto capital of the Provisional Democratic Government.

== Notable people ==
- Ioan Nicolidi of Pindus (1737–1828), Aromanian physician and noble in Austria
- Vassilis Rapotikas (1888–1943), Aromanian revolutionary and separatist, one of the leading members of the Aromanian Roman Legion
