= Kranochori =

- Settlement
- Location within Greece
- Coordinates: 40°27′27″N 21°5′57″E
- Country: Greece
- Geographic region: Macedonia
- Administrative region: Western Macedonia
- Regional unit: Kastoria
- Municipality: Nestorio
- Municipal unit: Nestorio
- Community: Ptelea

Population (2021)
  - Total: 192
- Time zone: UTC+2 (EET)
  - Summer (DST): UTC+3 (EEST)

Kranochori (Greek: Κρανοχώρι, before 1928: Δρανίτσι – Dranitsi) is a village in Kastoria Regional Unit, Macedonia, Greece. It is part of the community of Ptelea.

The 1920 Greek census recorded 289 people in the village, and 25 inhabitants (4 families) were Muslim in 1923. Following the Greek–Turkish population exchange, Greek refugee families in Dranitsi were from Pontus (6) in 1926. The 1928 Greek census recorded 305 village inhabitants. In 1928, the refugee families numbered 6 (17 people).

In 1945, Greek Foreign Minister Ioannis Politis ordered the compilation of demographic data regarding the Prefecture of Kastoria. The village Kranochori had a total of 377 inhabitants, and was populated by 320 Slavophones without a Bulgarian national consciousness.
