= Albania and Greece =

Albania and Greece may refer to:

- Albanian–Greek relations
- "Albania and Greece", an article by Ronald Montagu Burrows

== See also ==
- Albanian communities in Greece
- Albanian immigrants in Greece
- Greeks in Albania
