= Aitoliko–Katochi railway =

Railway line in Greece

Overview
- Native name: σιδηροδρομική γραμμή Αιτωλικού–Κατοχής
- Stations: 12

History
- Opened: 1912
- Closed: 1943

Technical
- Line length: 10.01 km (6.22 mi)
- Number of tracks: 1
- Track gauge: 1,000 mm (3 ft 3 3/8 in) metre gauge
- Electrification: none

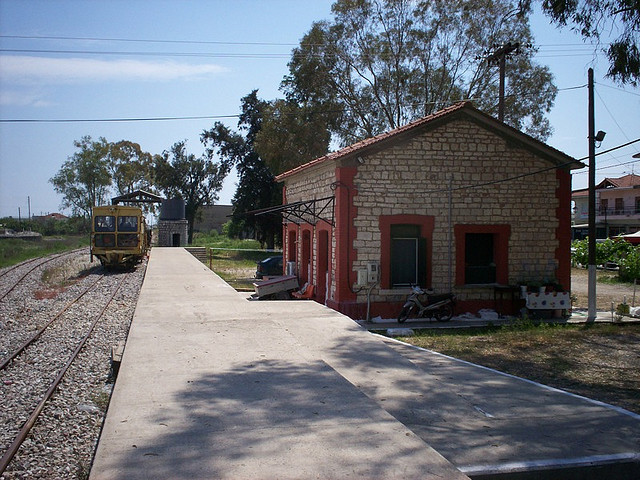
Aitoliko railway station

The Aitoliko–Katochi railway (Greek: σιδηροδρομική γραμμή Αιτωλικού–Κατοχής) was a metre gauge railway line of the Railways of Northwestern Greece. The line branched off the Kryoneri–Agrinio railway at Aitoliko station.

The line first opened in 1912 and united the city and the island of Aitoliko with the rest of the country on both sides of the lagoon via the two bridges which still serve the island and the city today. At the time, they were of mixed traffic (railroad and road). Katochi Station was located on the bank of the river Acheloos, across from the settlement of Katochi.

The line shut down except for freight services in 1943 by the Italian occupying forces who scraped it away, using the material to extend the Kryoneri–Agrinio line to Amfilochia. This construction began but was never completed due to the Italian surrender in early September. Very few traces remain today of the Aitoliko–Katochi line.
