= Mesovracho =

Village in Western Macedonia, Greece

- Settlement
- Location within Greece
- Coordinates: 40°27′57″N 20°59′16″E
- Country: Greece
- Geographic region: Macedonia
- Administrative region: Western Macedonia
- Regional unit: Kastoria
- Municipality: Nestorio
- Municipal unit: Akrites
- Community: Dipotamia

Population (2021)
  - Total: 3
- Time zone: UTC+2 (EET)
  - Summer (DST): UTC+3 (EEST)

Mesovracho (Greek: Μεσόβραχο, before 1927: Ζέλεγκραδ – Zelegkrad) is a village in Kastoria Regional Unit, Western Macedonia, Greece. It is part of the community of Dipotamia.

The 1920 Greek census recorded 260 people in the village, and 230 inhabitants (40 families) were Muslim in 1923. Following the Greek–Turkish population exchange, Greek refugee families in Zelegkrad were from Pontus (18) in 1926. The 1928 Greek census recorded 93 village inhabitants. In 1928, the refugee families numbered 18 (72 people).
