= Vasilios Metaxoulis =

Greek footballer

Personal information
- Full name: Vasilios Metaxoulis
- Date of birth: 16 June 1995 (age 31)
- Place of birth: Katochi, Greece
- Height: 1.80 m (5 ft 11 in)
- Position: Striker

Team information
- Current team: AO Thiva
- Number: 9

Youth career
- –2010: Panetolikos

Senior career*
Years	Team	Apps	(Gls)
2010–2014	Panetolikos	5	(0)
2014	→ A.E.Messolonghi F.C. (loan)	14	(3)
2014	Niki Volos F.C.	0	(0)
2015– 2016	Omiros	11	(5)
2016	Aiolos Karpenisiou	18	(17)
2016	AO Thiva	2	(1)
2017	Amvrisseas Distomou	9	(3)

International career
2011–	Greece U-17	2	(0)
- * Club domestic league appearances and goals as of 02:10, 4 February 2014 (UTC)

Vasilios Metaxoulis (Greek: Βασίλειος Μεταξούλης; born 16 June 1995) is a Greek footballer who currently plays for AO Thiva.

== Career ==
Metaxoulis began his career with the youth club of Panetolikos He signed his first professional contract with Panetolikos in February 2010, at the age of 14. He made his first-team debut on 11 November 2012, playing against Anagennisi Epanomi F.C. for the 2012–2013 Greek Football League. On 16 January 2014 he signed a six-month contract on loan with A.E.Messolonghi F.C.

In August 2014, Metaxoulis signed a three-year contract with Niki Volos F.C. In January 2016, Metaxoulis signed with Aiolos Karpenusiou.

Metaxoulis has been capped with the Greek U-17 squad.
