= Chionato =

Village in Macedonia, Greece

Chionato Χιονάτο
- Community
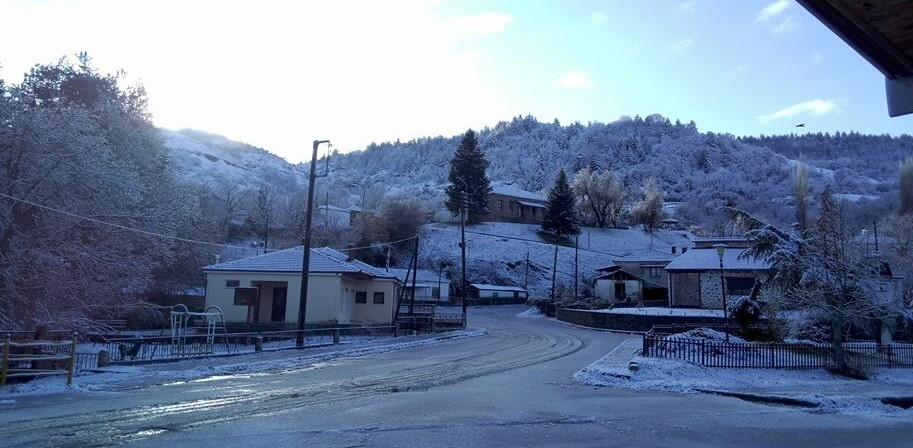
- Village centre

- Location within Greece
- Coordinates: 40°28′36″N 21°0′54″E
- Country: Greece
- Geographic region: Macedonia
- Administrative region: Western Macedonia
- Regional unit: Kastoria
- Municipality: Nestorio
- Municipal unit: Akrites

Population (2021)
  - Community: 114
- Time zone: UTC+2 (EET)
  - Summer (DST): UTC+3 (EEST)

Chionato (Greek: Χιονάτο, before 1928: Γκέρλιανη – Gkerliani) is a village in the Kastoria regional unit of Western Macedonia, Greece. Administratively it is a community of the Akrites municipal unit of the municipality of Nestorio. It has a permanent population of 114 according to the 2021 census.

== History ==
Chionato was ceded to Greece from the Ottoman Empire in 1913 after the Treaty of Bucharest that ended the Balkan Wars. It was then known as Gkerliani (Greek: Γκέρλιανη) and it was a Muslim Pomak village. The 1920 Greek census recorded 736 people in the village, and in 1923, before the Greek–Turkish population exchange, it had 710 inhabitants (110 families), all Muslims. Following the population exchange, they were transferred to Turkey and 87 families of Greek refugees had settled in their place by 1926, 58 of which were from Western Asia Minor and 29 were from Pontus. Out of those from Western Asia Minor, many are known to have been from the Propontis Tsakonian speaking villages in Mysia. Gkerliani remained the name of the village until 1928.

== Infrastructure ==
There is a municipal guest house in the settlement, there is a Greek Orthodox church of Saint Nicholas (1922) and a football field named after "Christina Giazitzidou" in honor of the Olympic rower Christina Giazitzidou, who is originally from Chionato.

== Notable people ==
- Christina Giazitzidou, Greek rower, originally from Chionato, who won a bronze medal at the 2012 Summer Olympics in London.
