= Komninades =

Village in Western Macedonia, Greece

Komninades Κομνηνάδες
- Community
- Location within Greece
- Coordinates: 40°31′7″N 20°59′50″E
- Country: Greece
- Geographic region: Macedonia
- Administrative region: Western Macedonia
- Regional unit: Kastoria
- Municipality: Nestorio
- Municipal unit: Akrites

Population (2021)
  - Community: 74
- Time zone: UTC+2 (EET)
  - Summer (DST): UTC+3 (EEST)

Komninades (Greek: Κομνηνάδες, before 1927: Σιάκι – Siaki; Albanian: Shag) is a village in Kastoria Regional Unit, Western Macedonia, Greece.

Siaki was populated by Albanian speaking Muslim inhabitants and they used to intermarry with the nearby Muslim villages of Menkulas, Vidohovë and Miras (now in Albania). The 1920 Greek census recorded 690 people in the village, and 683 inhabitants (95 families) were Muslim in 1923. Following the Greek–Turkish population exchange, the Muslim population of Siaki went to Turkey in 1924 and Anatolian Orthodox Christians settled in the village. Greek refugee families in Siaki were from Pontus (69) in 1926. The 1928 Greek census recorded 254 inhabitants. In 1928, the refugee families numbered 67 (266 people). After the population exchange, the site where the village mosque stood was replaced by the present church, the Assumption of the Virgin, built in 1931.
