= Akrites, Kastoria =

Municipal Unit in Macedonia, Greece

Akrites Ακρίτες
- Municipal unit
- Location of Akrites

- Location within Greece
- Coordinates: 40°29′N 21°00′E
- Country: Greece
- Geographic region: Macedonia
- Administrative region: Western Macedonia
- Regional unit: Kastoria
- Municipality: Nestorio

Area
  - Municipal unit: 85.7 km^{2} (33.1 sq mi)

Population (2021)
  - Municipal unit: 590
  - Municipal unit density: 6.9/km^{2} (18/sq mi)
- Time zone: UTC+2 (EET)
  - Summer (DST): UTC+3 (EEST)
- Vehicle registration: KT
- Website: nestorio.gr

Akrites (Greek: Ακρίτες) is a municipal unit of Nestorio Municipality in Kastoria regional unit, Western Macedonia, Greece. The municipal unit has an area of 85.724 km^{2} with a population of 590 inhabitants according to 2021 Greek census.

== Communities ==
The communities of the municipal unit are (settlements in brackets):

- Chionato
- Dipotamia (incl. Kali Vrysi and Mesovracho)
- Komninades
- Polyanemo

== Notable people ==
- Symeon Kortsalis, Greek revolutionary from Polyanemo who participated in Greek revolution of 1821
- Christina Giazitzidou, Greek rower, originally from Chionato, who won a bronze medal at the 2012 Summer Olympics in London
