= Christina Giazitzidou =

Greek rower (born 1989)

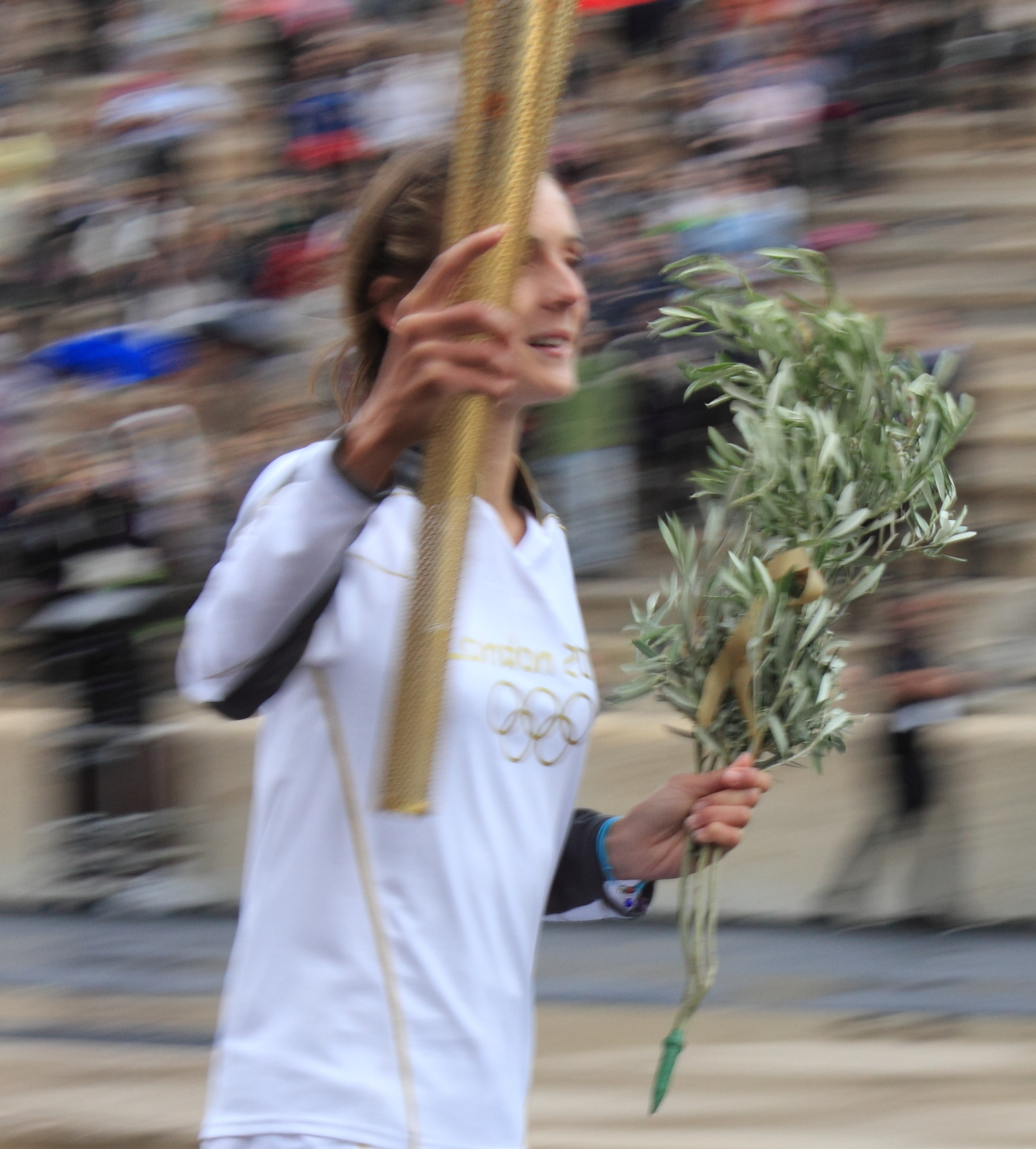
- Giazitzidou in 2012

Personal information
- Native name: Χριστίνα Γιαζιτζίδου
- Born: 12 October 1989 (age 37) Kastoria, Macedonia, Greece
Medal record
Women's rowing
Representing Greece
Olympic Games
Bronze medal – third place	2012 London	LW2x
World Rowing Championships
Gold medal – first place	2009 Poznań	LW2x
Gold medal – first place	2011 Bled	LW2x
Bronze medal – third place	2010 Karapiro	LW2x
European Rowing Championships
Gold medal – first place	2009 Brest	LW2x
Gold medal – first place	2010 Montemor-O-Velho	LW2x
Gold medal – first place	2011 Plovdiv	LW2x
Silver medal – second place	2012 Varese	LW2x
World Rowing U23 Championships
Gold medal – first place	2009 Racice	BLW2x
Gold medal – first place	2010 Brest	BLW2x
Gold medal – first place	2011 Amsterdam	BLW2x
Silver medal – second place	2008 Brandenburg	BLW2x
World Rowing Junior Championships
Bronze medal – third place	2007 Beijing	JW4x

Christina Giazitzidou (Greek: Χριστίνα Γιαζιτζίδου; born 12 October 1989) is a Greek rower. She won the bronze medal (along with Alexandra Tsiavou) at the 2012 Summer Olympics in London in the Women's lightweight double sculls.

== Personal life and early career ==
Giazitzidou was born in Kastoria, Macedonia, Greece, where she lives till today. She turned to rowing when she was about ten years old as a member of the Nautical Club of Kastoria (which is also her current club). Her first major international competition was during the 2006 World Rowing U23 Championships which were held in Hazewinkel, Belgium. She won bronze at the 2007 World Rowing Junior Championships in the women's quad sculls.

== Later achievements ==
In 2009, she first competed along with Alexandra Tsiavou in Women's lightweight double sculls during the 2009 World Rowing Championships in Poznań. Giazitzidou and Tsiavou won the gold medal. The following year, the Greek duo won the bronze medal in Karapiro, and in 2011 Giazitzidou and her teammate won the gold again. They also won gold in the event in the 2009, 2010 and 2011 European Championships. Giazitzidou also won the 2009, 2010 and 2011 Under-23 World Championships with Triantafyllia Kalampoka, following the pair winning the silver in 2008. Giazitzidou won the bronze medal (along with Alexandra Tsiavou) at the 2012 Summer Olympics in London, in Women's lightweight double sculls. They won the silver medal in the same event at the 2012 European Championships.

== Comeback to Greece ==
Christina Giazitzidou is originally from Chionato of Akrites Municipal Unit, in her honor, an event was held in the settlement and in the area, a Municipal Football Field was built in her name.
