= Arrenes =

Arrenes Αρρένες
- Municipal unit
- Location within the regional unit

- Location within Greece
- Coordinates: 40°13′N 21°01′E
- Country: Greece
- Geographic region: Macedonia
- Administrative region: Western Macedonia
- Regional unit: Kastoria
- Municipality: Nestorio

Area
  - Municipal unit: 134.6 km^{2} (52.0 sq mi)

Population (2021)
  - Municipal unit: 365
  - Municipal unit density: 2.71/km^{2} (7.02/sq mi)
- Time zone: UTC+2 (EET)
  - Summer (DST): UTC+3 (EEST)
- Vehicle registration: KT

Arrenes (Greek: Αρρένες) is a former community in Kastoria regional unit, Western Macedonia, Greece. Since the 2011 local government reform it is part of the municipality Nestorio, of which it is a municipal unit. The municipal unit has an area of 134.600 km^{2}. Population 365 (2021). The seat of the community was in Eptachori.

== Communities ==
The communities of the municipal unit are:

- Chrysi (incl. the settlement Pefkofyto)
- Eptachori
- Zouzouli
