= Alexandra Tsiavou =

Greek rower (born 1985)

Medal record

Women's rowing

Representing Greece

Olympic Games
| Bronze medal – third place | 2012 London | Lwt double scull |

World Rowing Championships
| Gold medal – first place | 2009 Poznań | Lwt double scull |
| Gold medal – first place | 2011 Bled | Lwt double scull |
| Gold medal – first place | 2012 Plovdiv | Lwt single scull |
| Bronze medal – third place | 2006 Eton | Lwt double scull |
| Bronze medal – third place | 2010 Karapiro | Lwt double scull |

European Rowing Championships
| Gold medal – first place | 2007 Poznań | Lwt double scull |
| Gold medal – first place | 2008 Athens | Lwt double scull |
| Gold medal – first place | 2009 Brest | Lwt double scull |
| Gold medal – first place | 2010 Montemor-o-Velho | Lwt double scull |
| Gold medal – first place | 2011 Plovdiv | Lwt double scull |
| Silver medal – second place | 2012 Varese | Lwt double scull |

World Rowing U23 Championships
| Gold medal – first place | 2006 Hazewinkel | Lwt single scull |
| Gold medal – first place | 2007 Glasgow | Lwt single scull |

Alexandra Tsiavou (Greek: Αλεξάνδρα Τσιάβου; born 26 September 1985 in Igoumenitsa) is a Greek rower. She won the bronze medal (along with Christina Giazitzidou) at the 2012 Summer Olympics in London (lightweight double sculls) and she took the 6th place (along with Chrysi Biskitzi) at the 2008 Summer Olympics in Beijing (lightweight double sculls).

She was named the Greek Female Athlete of the Year for the years 2009 and 2010.

== Biography and career ==
Tsiavou was born in Igoumenitsa, Greece, where she lives, and her origin is from Vrisella Filiates. As a child she was an athlete of artistic gymnastics but she left that sport due to her height (176 cm). In 1998 she turned to rowing as a member of her local nautical club. Three years later, she was member of the Greek national team for the first time. In 2006, she won the bronze medal at the World Rowing Championships. She took the 6th place (along with Chrysi Biskitzi) at the 2008 Summer Olympics in Beijing and in 2009 she won the gold medal along with Christina Giazitzidou at the Poznań's regatta. The following year, Tsiavou won the bronze medal in Karapiro and in 2011 she was first in Bled's world championship. Tsiavou won the bronze medal (along with Christina Giazitzidou) at the 2012 Summer Olympics in London (lightweight double sculls).
