= Ioan Nicolidi of Pindus =

Aromanian physician and noble

- Born: Ioan Nicolidi; 14 March 1737; Gramos, Ottoman Empire
- Died: 12 October 1828 (aged 91); Vienna, Austrian Empire
- Education: University of Vienna
- Occupation: Physician

Ioan Nicolidi of Pindus (14 March 1737 – 12 October 1828; Aromanian: Ioan Nicolidi di Pind; German: Johann Nicolides von Pindo; Greek: Ιωάννης Νικολίδης Πίνδος, romanized: Ioannis Nikolidis Pindos) was an Aromanian physician and noble. Born in Gramos (Aromanian: Gramosta), he migrated to Siatista and then to Vienna to complete his studies in medicine. He gained great popularity as a physician in Vienna, being awarded the nobiliary particle von Pindo ("of Pindus") for his services.

== Biography ==
=== Life ===
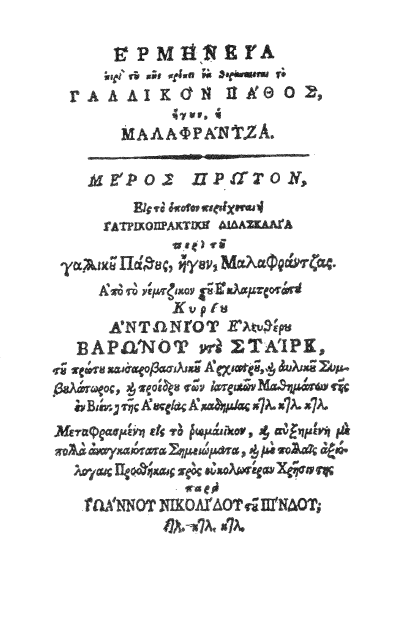
Title page of Ioan Nicolidi's 1794 translation into Greek of Anton von Störck's Ueber die Lustseuche, a work on syphilis.

Ioan Nicolidi was born on 14 March 1737 in Gramos (Aromanian: Gramosta), then the Ottoman Empire and now Greece. He was an ethnic Aromanian as shown by the contemporary Greek scholar Georgios Zaviras and by the professor of the Eötvös Loránd University in Budapest Alexander Pecz, who was in contact with members of the Nicolidi family. He was educated in the primary school of his native village, later migrating to Siatista to study in a secondary school of history, physics and theology.

As his parents refused his intention to complete his studies at the University of Vienna in the Habsburg monarchy, now Austria, he set out on a journey without money, went into commercial activities in Zemun to pay for his studies, and arrived in Vienna. After surviving an illness, he started and finished his medical studies in just two years, receiving a doctorate; he had been teaching Greek in the city at the same time. The thesis with which he graduated was titled Dissertatio inauguralis physiologico-medica sistens pyogoniam quam annuente inclyta facultate medica in antiquissima et celeberrima Universitate vindobonensi pro doctoris gradu publicae disquisitioni submittit Joannes Nicolides Macedo Grammostensis.

After this, he was named by Holy Roman Emperor Joseph II as "First Doctor of Greek Coreligionists", treating Greek-speaking patients in Vienna, some of whom knew only Greek. He soon gained a great reputation in Vienna, being declared a full member of the medical faculty of the university of the city. Due to his services, Holy Roman Emperor Leopold II awarded him the nobiliary particle von Pindo ("of Pindus"). His nephew, Sterghie Eustatie Nicolidi, member of the Community of Greeks and Vlachs of Vienna ("Vlach" being another name for the Aromanians), also received this title.

Austrian physician Anton von Störck requested to Ioan Nicolidi of Pindus if he could translate his works Ueber die Lustseuche ("About the Lust Disease") and Die praktisch-medicinische Lehre zum Gebrauche der Militär- und Landchirurgen ("The Practical-Medical Teaching for the Use of Military and Rural Surgeons") into Greek. The former, a work on syphilis, was translated into popular rather than literary Greek, so that it could be understood both by educated and uneducated readers. It included additions by Nicolidi of Pindus that he deemed important.

Nicolidi of Pindus invented the "Life Balm" (German: Lebensbalsam; Greek: Βαλσαμος τες ζωές, romanized: Valsamos tes zoes), which gained great fame and was even sold in modern Greece and Turkey. In 1827, Nicolidi donated 120 volumes of classical works to the Aromanian–Greek community of Vienna.

=== Death and aftermath ===
Nicolidi of Pindus died on 12 October 1828 in Vienna, aged 91. Most of the information about his life comes from an obituary published by a person under the acronym of P. D., thought to have been a person close to Nicolidi, titled Gallerie denkwürdiger Männer des Vaterlandes. Iohann Nicolides von Pindo, gestorben zu Wien den 12. Oct. 1828 ("Gallery of Memorable Men of the Fatherland. Ioan Nicolidi of Pindus, died in Vienna on 12 October 1828"). This person praised Nicolidi's great knowledge but also his disinterest, as it is said in the obituary that he treated poor patients and gave them the medicines they needed for free.

Members of the Nicolidi family are documented in history until 1905, as members of the administration council of the St. George Church of Vienna.
