= Aitoliko railway station =

Greek railway station

Coordinates: 38°26′17″N 21°21′52″E

Αιτωλικού Aitoliko
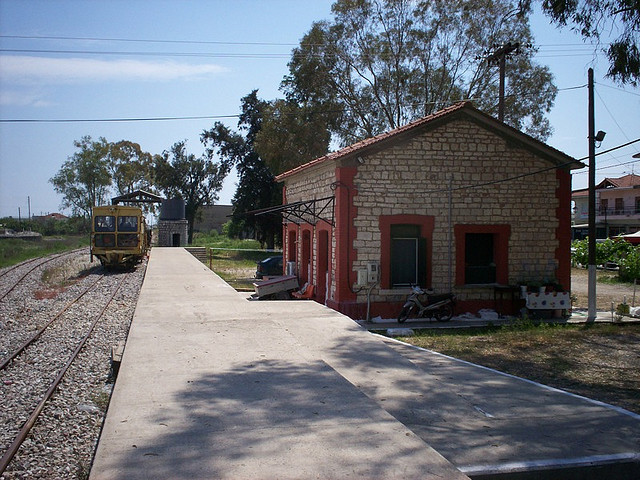
- Aitoliko railway station, April 2007

General information
- Location: Aitoliko; 304 00 Missolonghi; Greece
- Owner: GAIAOSE
- Line: Kryoneri–Agrinio railway Aitoliko–Katochi railway
- Platforms: 1
- Tracks: 2 (with sidings)

Construction
- Structure type: at-grade
- Platform levels: 1
- Parking: Yes
- Cycle facilities: No

Other information
- Website: http://www.ose.gr/en/

History
- Opened: October 1890
- Closed: 1972

Services
Preceding station	Hellenic Train	Following station
Kefalovrysso towards Alexandroupoli	Regional	Terminus
Past service
Northwestern Greece Railways
Issodos Etolikou	Aitoliko–Katochi line	Terminus
Location
- Location within Greece

Aitoliko railway station (Greek: Σιδηροδρομικός Σταθμός Αιτωλικού, Sidirodromikos Stathmos Etolikou) was a railway station in the town of Aitoliko in Aetolia-Acarnania, Greece.

== History ==
The station took its name from the town that it served, and it was located east of the island which contains the town centre of Aitoliko. Construction was completed by the Northwestern Greece Railways in October 1890, it later marked the starting point of the rail line with Katochi which was used between 1912 and 1943 when that line was shut down. The station closed down in 1972 along with the entire Kryoneri-Agrinio Line. It had one platform, its newer station was renovated in 2003.

== Services ==
The station served two rail lines:

- Kryoneri–Agrinio railway, at km 26.890 from Kryoneri Limena.
- Aitoliko–Katochi railway, the starting point of the line

Preceding station	TrainOSE	Following station
Kefalovrysso	Kryoneri-Agrinio	Finikia
Issodos Etolikou	Aitoliko–Katochi railway	terminus
