= Stena, Kastoria =

Stena
- Settlement
- Location within Greece
- Coordinates: 40°26′05.87″N 21°02′28.06″E
- Country: Greece
- Geographic region: Macedonia
- Administrative region: Western Macedonia
- Regional unit: Kastoria
- Municipality: Kastoria
- Municipal unit: Nestorio
- Community: Nestorio

Population (2021)
  - Total: 3
- Time zone: UTC+2 (EET)
  - Summer (DST): UTC+3 (EEST)

Stena (Greek: Στενά, before 1926: Στέντσκον – Stentskon) is a village in Kastoria Regional Unit, Macedonia, Greece. It is part of the community of Nestorio.

In 1945, Greek Foreign Minister Ioannis Politis ordered the compilation of demographic data regarding the Prefecture of Kastoria. The village Stena had a total of 204 inhabitants, and was populated by 180 Slavophones without a Bulgarian national consciousness.
