= Agia Anna, Kastoria =

Agia Anna
- Settlement
- Location within Greece
- Coordinates: 40°26′12″N 21°04′54″E
- Country: Greece
- Geographic region: Macedonia
- Administrative region: Western Macedonia
- Regional unit: Kastoria
- Municipality: Kastoria
- Municipal unit: Nestorio
- Community: Nestorio

Population (2021)
  - Total: 31
- Time zone: UTC+2 (EET)
  - Summer (DST): UTC+3 (EEST)

Agia Anna (Greek: Αγία Άννα, before 1928: Ραδιγκόσδη – Radigkosdi) is a village in Kastoria Regional Unit, Macedonia, Greece. It is part of the community of Nestorio.

In 1945, Greek Foreign Minister Ioannis Politis ordered the compilation of demographic data regarding the Prefecture of Kastoria. The village Agia Anna had a total of 152 inhabitants, and was populated by 140 Slavophones without a Bulgarian national consciousness.
