= Livadotopi =

Village in Macedonia, Greece

Livadotopi Λιβαδοτόπι
- Settlement
- Location within Greece
- Coordinates: 40°25′18″N 20°57′36″E
- Country: Greece
- Geographic region: Macedonia
- Administrative region: Western Macedonia
- Regional unit: Kastoria
- Municipality: Nestorio
- Municipal unit: Nestorio
- Community: Nestorio

Population (2021)
  - Total: 15
- Time zone: UTC+2 (EET)
  - Summer (DST): UTC+3 (EEST)

Livadotopi (Greek: Λιβαδοτόπι, before 1928: Όμοτσκο – Omotsko) is a village in Kastoria Regional Unit, Macedonia, Greece. It is part of the community of Nestorio.

In 1923, there were 6 Muslim families (30 people) in Omotsko.
