= Dipotamia =

Village in Macedonia, Greece

Dipotamia Διποταμία
- Community
- Location within Greece
- Coordinates: 40°29′17″N 20°59′12″E
- Country: Greece
- Geographic region: Macedonia
- Administrative region: Western Macedonia
- Regional unit: Kastoria
- Municipality: Nestorio
- Municipal unit: Akrites

Population (2021)
  - Community: 391
- Time zone: UTC+2 (EET)
  - Summer (DST): UTC+3 (EEST)

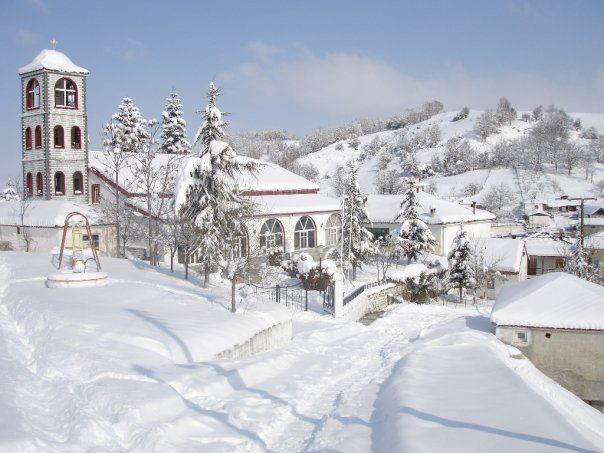
Dịpotamia

Dipotamia (Greek: Διποταμία, before 1927: Ρέβανη – Revani; Albanian: Revan) is a village and a community in Kastoria Regional Unit, Macedonia, Greece. The community includes the villages Kali Vrysi and Mesovracho.

Revani was populated by Albanian speaking Muslim inhabitants and they used to intermarry with the nearby Muslim villages of Menkulas, Vidohovë and Miras (now in Albania). The 1920 Greek census recorded 721 people in the village, and 673 inhabitants (85 families) were Muslim in 1923. Following the Greek–Turkish population exchange, the Muslim population of Revani went to Turkey in 1924 and Anatolian Orthodox Christians settled in the village. Greek refugee families in Revani were from Pontus (130) in 1926. The 1928 Greek census recorded 468 inhabitants. In 1928, the refugee families numbered 128 (493 people). After the population exchange, the site where the village mosque stood was replaced by the present church, the Assumption of the Virgin, built in 1925.
