= Kypseli, Kastoria =

Village in Macedonia, Greece

Kypseli Κυψέλη
- Community
- Location within Greece
- Coordinates: 40°17′16″N 21°01′45″E
- Country: Greece
- Geographic region: Macedonia
- Administrative region: Western Macedonia
- Regional unit: Kastoria
- Municipality: Nestorio
- Elevation: 1,080 m (3,540 ft)

Population (2021)
  - Community: 58
- Time zone: UTC+2 (EET)
  - Summer (DST): UTC+3 (EEST)
- Vehicle registration: KT

Kypseli (Greek: Κυψέλη, before 1926: Ψέλτσκον – Pseltskon) is a small mountainous village in Kastoria Regional Unit, Macedonia, Greece. According to the 2021 Greek census, the village had 58 inhabitants.

== Demographics ==
According to the statistics of the Bulgarian geographer Vasil Kanchov, the village had 680 Christian Greek inhabitants in 1900. The majority of the inhabitants of the village moved to Kastoria and Maniakoi in 1970s.
