= Ano Ydroussa =

- Community
- Location within Greece
- Coordinates: 40°42.1′N 21°28.33′E
- Country: Greece
- Geographic region: Macedonia
- Administrative region: Western Macedonia
- Regional unit: Florina
- Municipality: Florina
- Municipal unit: Perasma

Population (2021)
  - Community: 209
- Time zone: UTC+2 (EET)
  - Summer (DST): UTC+3 (EEST)

Ano Ydroussa (Greek: Άνω Υδρούσσα, before 1928: Άνω Κόττορι – Ano Kottori) is a village in Florina regional unit, Western Macedonia, Greece.

The village in Ottoman Turkish was called Yukarı Kotor. In statistics gathered by Vasil Kanchov in 1900, Ano Kottori was populated by 60 Christian Albanians and 168 Bulgarians. Kanchov wrote that Christian Albanians of the late Ottoman period in Ano Kottori were increasingly being assimilated by its Bulgarian population.

In the early twentieth century, Kato Kotori was involved with the Bulgarian national movement. Immigrants from the village in Toronto, Canada participated in the early Bulgarian community to build church infrastructure.

Ano Idrousa had 333 inhabitants in 1981. In fieldwork done by anthropologist Riki Van Boeschoten in late 1993, Ano Idrousa was populated by Slavophones and Arvanites. The Macedonian language was used by people of all ages, both in public and private settings, and as the main language for interpersonal relationships. Some elderly villagers had little knowledge of Greek.
