= Agios Vartholomaios =

- Community
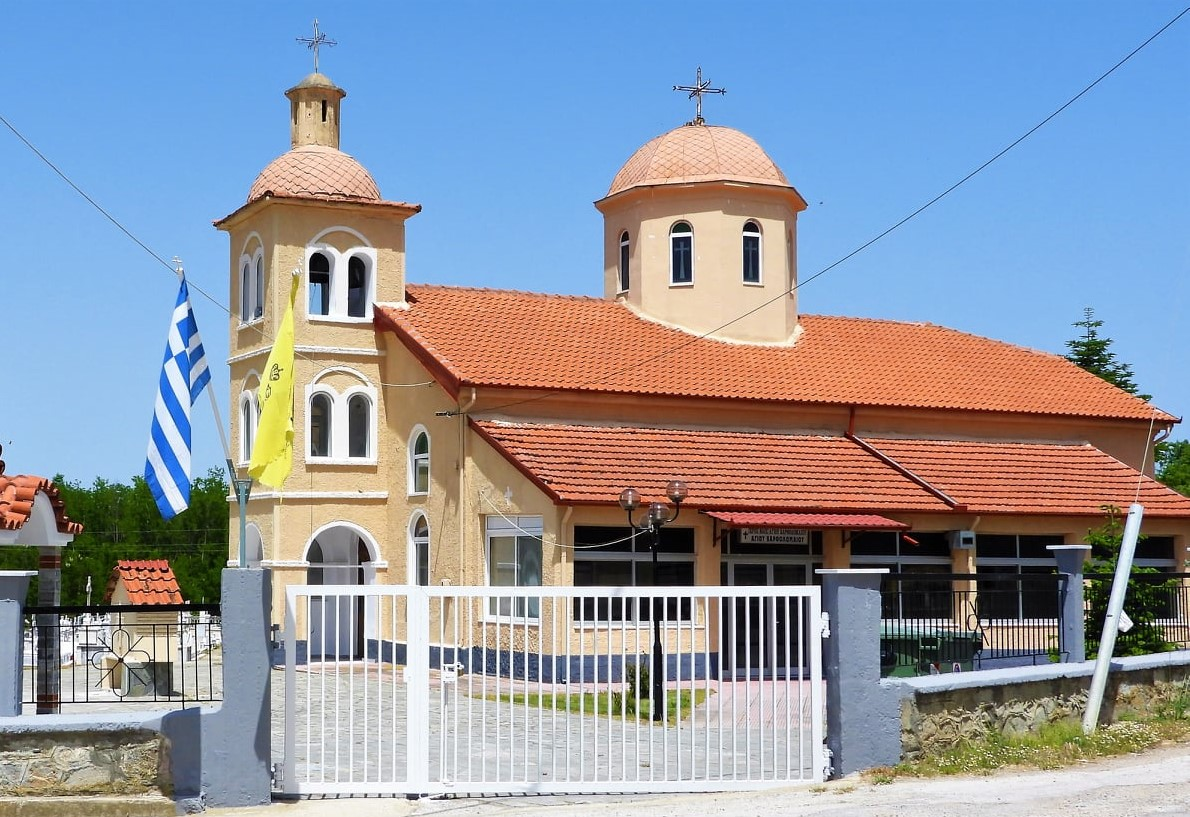
- Agios Vartholomaios village church

- Location within Greece
- Coordinates: 40°45′39″N 21°31′40″E
- Country: Greece
- Geographic region: Macedonia
- Administrative region: Western Macedonia
- Regional unit: Florina
- Municipality: Florina
- Municipal unit: Perasma

Population (2021)
  - Community: 157
- Time zone: UTC+2 (EET)
  - Summer (DST): UTC+3 (EEST)

Agios Vartholomaios (Greek: Άγιος Βαρθολομαίος, before 1926: Βαρθολώμ – Vartholom, between 1926–1928: Βαρθολομαίος – Vartholomaios) is a village in Florina regional unit, Western Macedonia, Greece. The village has an altitude of 667 m (2,188 ft).

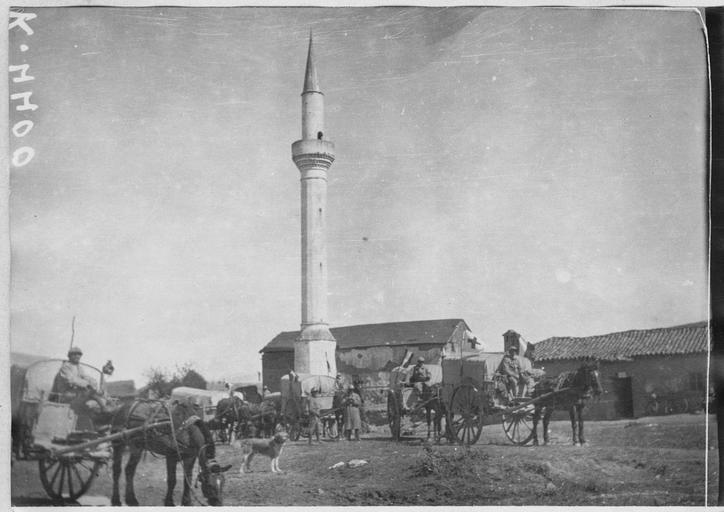
French soldiers in front of village mosque (WWI).

In the late 15th century, the village was recorded as a timar holding with 26 families and as a settlement with a mixed population of Muslims and Christians. Later, as a Muslim populated village it belonged to the kaza (district) of Florina. According to the statistics of Vasil Kanchov ("Macedonia, Ethnography and Statistics"), 360 Muslim Albanians lived in the village in 1900. The village was populated by 460 Muslims in 1912. The 1920 Greek census recorded 487 people in the village, and 447 inhabitants (80 families) were Muslim in 1923.

Following the Greek–Turkish population exchange, Muslim villagers left and Christian refugees in 1924 from mainly Pontus and the Caucasus settled in the village. Greek refugee families in Vartholom were from Asia Minor (3), Pontus (41) and the Caucasus (51) in 1926. The 1928 Greek census recorded 219 village inhabitants. In 1928, the refugee families numbered 94 (353 people). The village mosque with a tall minaret was destroyed. Since 1928, the inhabitants from the village are all from a Greek refugee origin. The population of Agios Vartholomaios was 828 in 1940. In the Greek Civil War, the village was occupied by the Democratic Army of Greece (DAG). The inhabitants numbered 757 in 1951, 601 in 1961 and 200 in 1981.

In fieldwork done by anthropologist Riki Van Boeschoten in late 1993, Agios Vartholomaios was populated by a Greek population descended from Anatolian Greek refugees who arrived during the population exchange. Pontic Greek was spoken by people over 60, mainly in private.
