= Oiniades =

Oiniades Οινιάδες
- Municipal unit
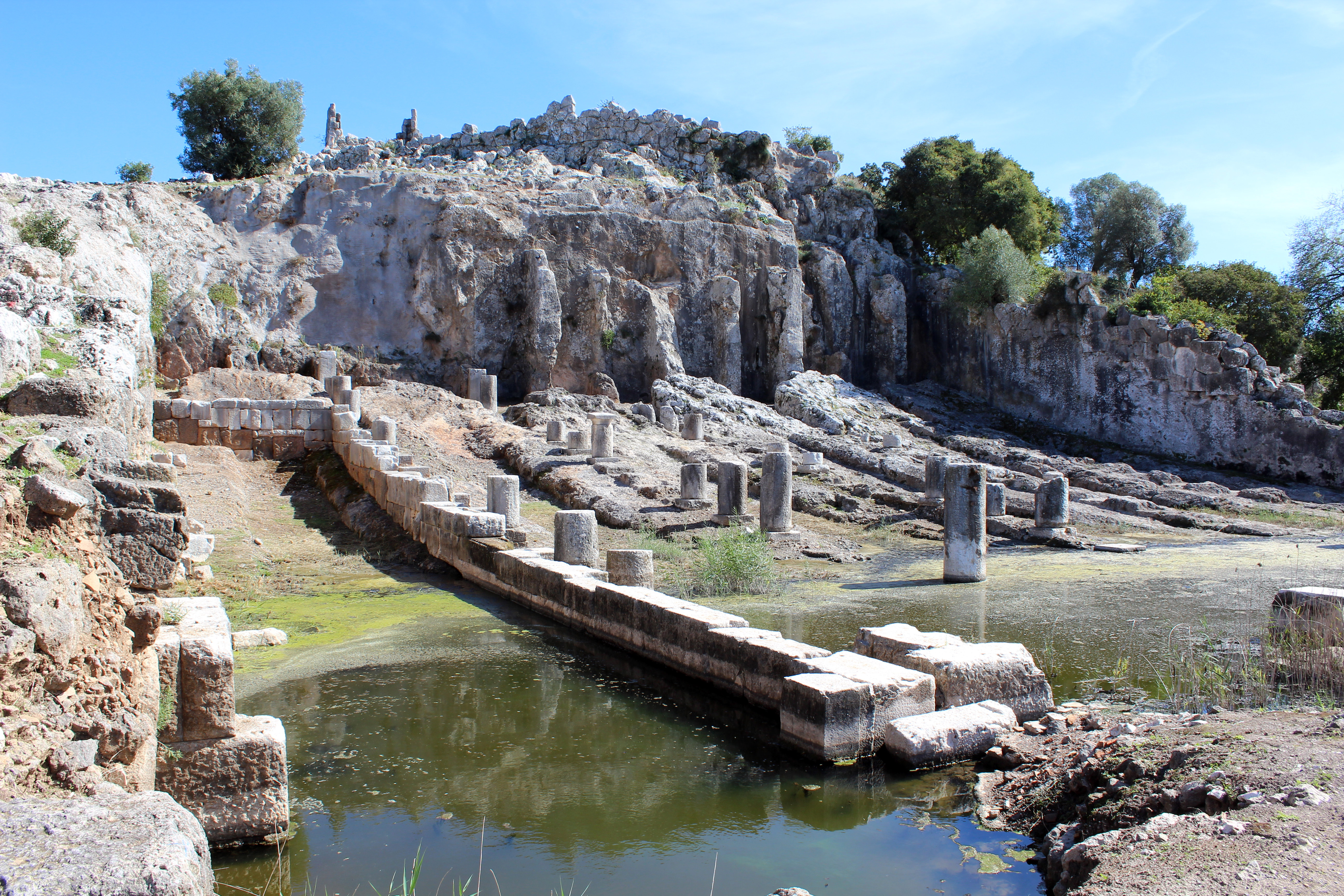
- The ancient shipyard

- Location within the regional unit

- Location within Greece
- Coordinates: 38°24.7′N 21°11.7′E
- Country: Greece
- Administrative region: West Greece
- Regional unit: Aetolia-Acarnania
- Municipality: Messolonghi

Area
  - Municipal unit: 270.9 km^{2} (104.6 sq mi)
- Elevation: 10 m (33 ft)

Population (2021)
  - Municipal unit: 8,393
  - Municipal unit density: 30.98/km^{2} (80.24/sq mi)
- Time zone: UTC+2 (EET)
  - Summer (DST): UTC+3 (EEST)
- Postal code: 300 01
- Area code: 2210
- Vehicle registration: ME

Oiniades (Greek: Οινιάδες) is a municipal unit of the municipality Missolonghi, Greece. The municipal unit has an area of 270.899 km^{2}. It was named after the ancient town of Oeniadae.

== History ==
Ancient Oeniadae (Ancient Greek: Οἰνιάδαι) was a port town on the west bank of the river Achelous and one of the most important towns of ancient Acarnania. Oeniadai was first mentioned in the 5th century BC.

It was situated against a hill in the marshes, which protected it from invaders. Its location has been identified on that of the present village Katochi.

It was an important port on the route to Corfu. It changed its alliances repeatedly in the course of history; at first it was a member of the Peloponnesian League, but in 424 BC it was incorporated in the Delian League. In the Hellenistic period, Oiniadai allied with the Aetolians until 218 BC when Philip V declared it free. From 211 to 189 BC during the Roman-Macedonian wars the city was again under Aetolian control. In Roman times it lost its strategic importance. However it was still inhabited in the 3rd century AD judging from coin finds.

== Archaeology ==
The city walls are well preserved and several buildings were excavated beginning in 1900-1901:

- a theatre
- a bath complex
- a shipyard.

== Municipality ==
=== Subdivisions ===
The municipal unit Oiniades is subdivided into the following communities (constituent villages in brackets):

- Neochori Mesolongiou (Neochori, Magoula, Marmara)
- Gouria
- Katochi
- Lesini
- Mastros (Mastros, Platania)
- Pentalofo

=== Population ===
Year	Municipality population
1991	10,686
2001	10,227
2011	9,373
2021	8,393
