= Tropaiouchos =

Tropaiouchos Τροπαιούχος
- Community
- Location within Greece
- Coordinates: 40°44′26″N 21°26′29″E
- Country: Greece
- Geographic region: Macedonia
- Administrative region: Western Macedonia
- Regional unit: Florina
- Municipality: Florina
- Municipal unit: Perasma

Population (2021)
  - Community: 291
- Time zone: UTC+2 (EET)
  - Summer (DST): UTC+3 (EEST)

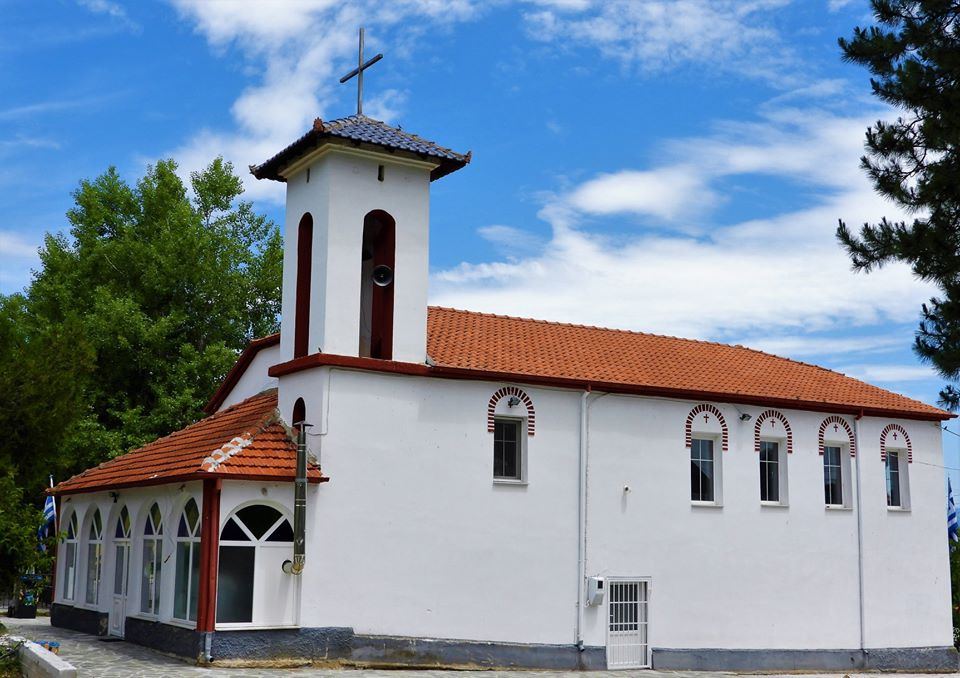
Church in Tropeouchos, Florina

Tropaiouchos (Greek: Τροπαιούχος, before 1929: Μαχαλάς – Machalas) is a village in Florina regional unit, Western Macedonia, Greece.

According to the statistics of Vasil Kanchov ("Macedonia, Ethnography and Statistics"), 600 Muslim Turks and 110 Muslim Albanians lived in the village in 1900.

The 1920 Greek census recorded 450 people in the village, and 350 inhabitants (97 families) were Muslim in 1923. Following the Greek–Turkish population exchange, Greek refugee families in Machalas were from East Thrace (18), Asia Minor (12) and the Caucasus (30) in 1926. The 1928 Greek census recorded 430 village inhabitants. In 1928, the refugee families numbered 50 (213 people).
