= Lake Gistova =

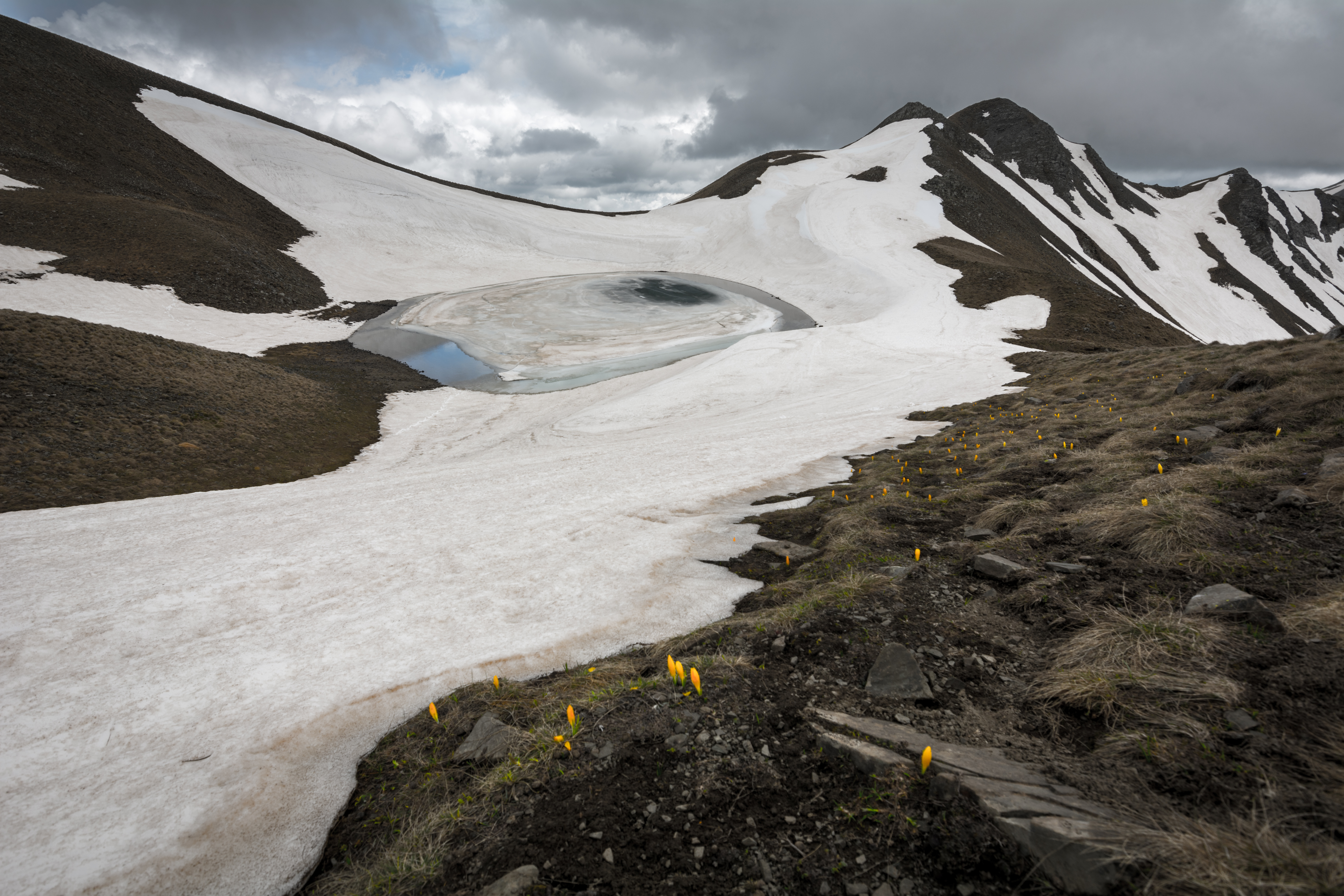
- View of lake Gistova in the winter

- Location within Greece
- Interactive map of Lake Gistova
- Location: Gramos mountain
- Coordinates: 40.3646°N 20.7905°E
- Lake type: Alpine lake
- Basin countries: Greece
- Surface elevation: 2,365 m (7,759 ft)

Lake Gistova (Greek: Λίμνη Γκιστόβα; Albanian: Liqeni i Gistovës or Gramozit), also known as Drakolimni (Δρακολίμνη, similar to other lakes in northwestern Greece), is a small lake located in Greece alongside the Greek-Albanian border. It is the highest alpine lake in Greece, (Note: In accordance with the publications of the Albanian Military Topographic Institute, as well as the National Territorial Planning Agency of Albania, Lake Gistova is not included in the border delimitations of Albania. It is located entirely within Greece.) and one of the highest in the Balkans. It is located at an elevation of about 2,365 metres (7,759 ft), on the Gramos mountain, and has a regular elliptical shape. The maximum depth is around 4 m. The lake gets the water from the melting of ice-snow in a caldera on the tip of a pike of the mountain complex, and it is free of ice for about four months of the year. The newt species Ichthyosaura alpestris veluchiensis inhabits the lake.
