= Ydroussa, Florina =

Ydroussa Υδρούσα
- Community
- Location within Greece
- Coordinates: 40°43.18′N 21°27.40′E
- Country: Greece
- Geographic region: Macedonia
- Administrative region: Western Macedonia
- Regional unit: Florina
- Municipality: Florina
- Municipal unit: Perasma

Population (2021)
  - Community: 252
- Time zone: UTC+2 (EET)
  - Summer (DST): UTC+3 (EEST)

Ydroussa (Greek: Υδρούσα, before 1927: Κάτω Κόττορι – Kato Kottori) is a village in Florina regional unit, Western Macedonia, Greece.

The village in Ottoman Turkish was called Aşağı Kotor. In statistics gathered by Vasil Kanchov in 1900, Kato Kottori was populated by 174 Christian Albanians and 600 Bulgarians. Kanchov wrote that Christian Albanians of the late Ottoman period in Kato Kottori were increasingly being assimilated by its Bulgarian population.

In the early twentieth century, Kato Kotori was involved with the Bulgarian national movement. Immigrants from the village in Toronto, Canada participated in the early Bulgarian community to build church infrastructure.

During the 1940s, kin relations began to be formed between the Slavophone (Dopioi) and Arvanite populations of the village. Villagers from both groups together attended school, partook in social events and looked after each other during the Second World War and Greek Civil War. Pre–war and post–war immigration from Ydroussa led to the formation of a diaspora and most of the village population lives abroad in the northern suburbs of Melbourne in Australia.

Ydroussa had 456 inhabitants in 1981. In fieldwork done by anthropologist Riki Van Boeschoten in late 1993, (Kato) Ydroussa was populated by Slavophones and Arvanites. The Macedonian language was spoken in the village by people over 30 in public and private settings. Children understood the language, but mostly did not use it.

In the late 1990s, in fieldwork done by Ioannis Manos, much of the Ydroussa village population self identified as Dopioi, a designation used by Slavophones of the Florina region and the remainder as Arvanites. There were seldom elderly individuals with knowledge of Arvanitika.
