= Ptelea, Kastoria =

Village in Macedonia, Greece

Ptelea
- Community
- Location within Greece
- Coordinates: 40°27′43.3″N 21°04′23.97″E
- Country: Greece
- Geographic region: Macedonia
- Administrative region: Western Macedonia
- Regional unit: Kastoria
- Municipality: Nestorio
- Municipal unit: Nestorio

Population (2021)
  - Community: 273
- Time zone: UTC+2 (EET)
  - Summer (DST): UTC+3 (EEST)

Ptelea (Greek: Πτελιά, before 1928: Γκρέντση – Gkrentsi, between 1928 and 1949: Φτελιά – Ftelia) is a village and a community in Kastoria Regional Unit, Macedonia, Greece.

In 1945, Greek Foreign Minister Ioannis Politis ordered the compilation of demographic data regarding the Prefecture of Kastoria. The village had a total of 472 inhabitants, and was populated by 450 Slavophones without a Bulgarian national consciousness.
