= Pefkos, Kastoria =

Pefkos Πεύκος
- Settlement
- Location within Greece
- Coordinates: 40°23′21″N 20°57′13″E
- Country: Greece
- Geographic region: Macedonia
- Administrative region: Western Macedonia
- Regional unit: Kastoria
- Municipality: Nestorio
- Municipal unit: Nestorio
- Community: Nestorio

Population (2021)
  - Total: 22
- Time zone: UTC+2 (EET)
  - Summer (DST): UTC+3 (EEST)

Pefkos (Greek: Πεύκος, before 1928: Τούχουλη – Touchouli) is a village in Kastoria Regional Unit, Macedonia, Greece. It is part of the community of Nestorio.

Touchouli was inhabited by an Albanian speaking population. The 1920 Greek census recorded 334 people in the village, and 50 inhabitants (10 families) were Muslim in 1923.
