= Katochi =

Katochi Κατοχή
- Community
- Location within Greece
- Coordinates: 38°24′N 21°15′E
- Country: Greece
- Administrative region: West Greece
- Regional unit: Aetolia-Acarnania
- Municipality: Oiniades
- Elevation: 10 m (33 ft)

Population (2021)
  - Community: 2,514
- Time zone: UTC+2 (EET)
  - Summer (DST): UTC+3 (EEST)
- Postal code: 300 07
- Area code: 26320
- Vehicle registration: ME

Katochi (Greek: Κατοχή) is a village and a community in the municipal unit of Oiniades in Aetolia-Acarnania, West Greece, Greece. In 2021, it had a population of 2,514.
