= Giannochori =

Giannochori Γιαννοχώρι
- Settlement
- Location within Greece
- Coordinates: 40°26′54″N 20°55′31″E
- Country: Greece
- Geographic region: Macedonia
- Administrative region: Western Macedonia
- Regional unit: Kastoria
- Municipality: Nestorio
- Municipal unit: Nestorio
- Community: Nestorio

Population (2021)
  - Total: 6
- Time zone: UTC+2 (EET)
  - Summer (DST): UTC+3 (EEST)

Giannochori (Greek: Γιαννοχώρι, before 1927: Γιαννοβαίνη – Giannovaini) is a village in Kastoria Regional Unit, Macedonia, Greece. It is part of the community of Nestorio.

Giannochorio was an Albanian speaking village with a Christian population in a wider Slavic speaking area. As a bilingual village, both the Albanian and (Slavic) Macedonian languages were spoken. Later Giannochorio became a monolingual Slavophone village, in particular its female villagers, followed by a new bilingualism with Greek as a second language.
