= Nestorio =

Village in Macedonia, Greece

Nestorio Νεστόριο
- Municipality
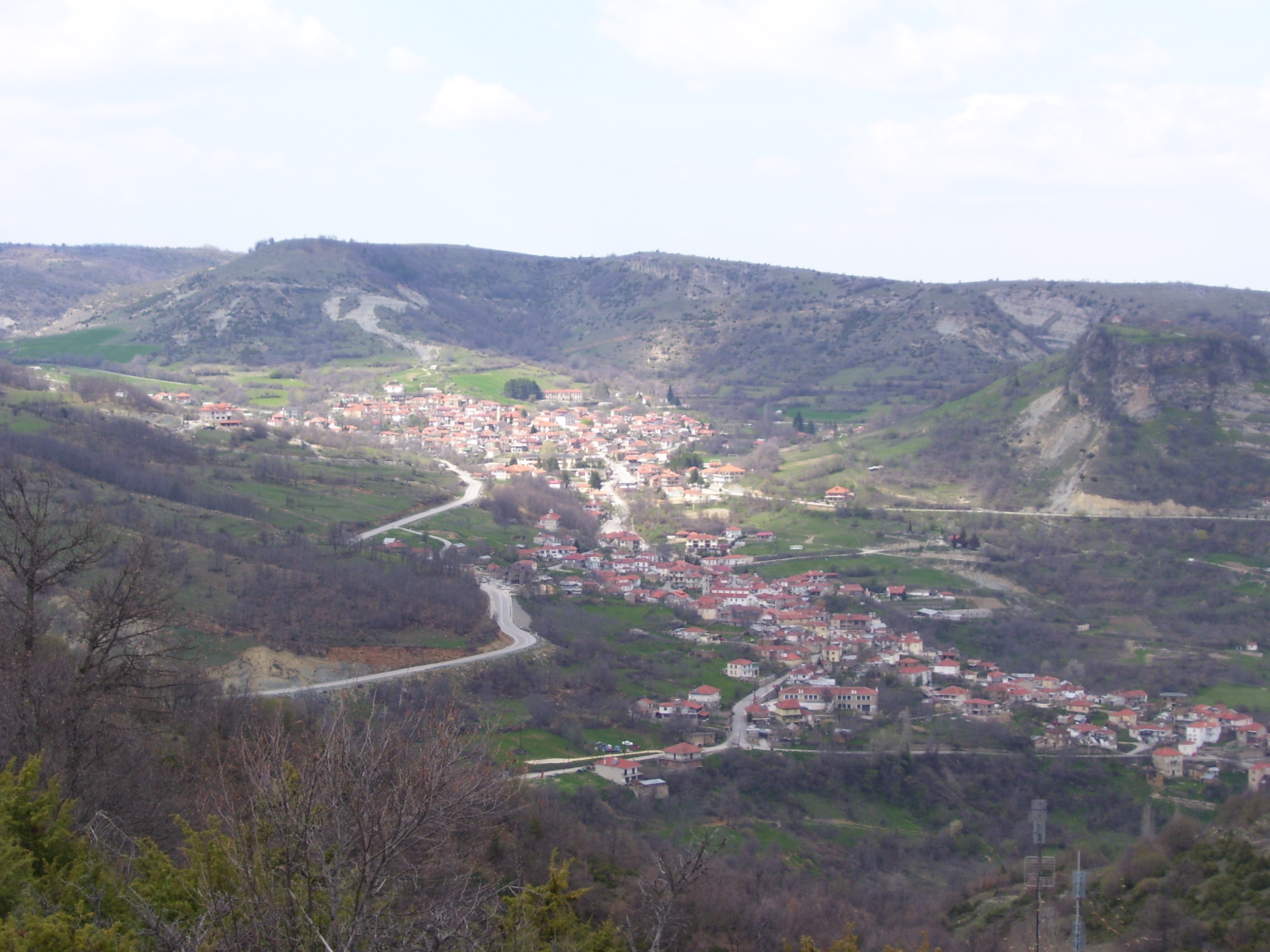
- Panoramic view

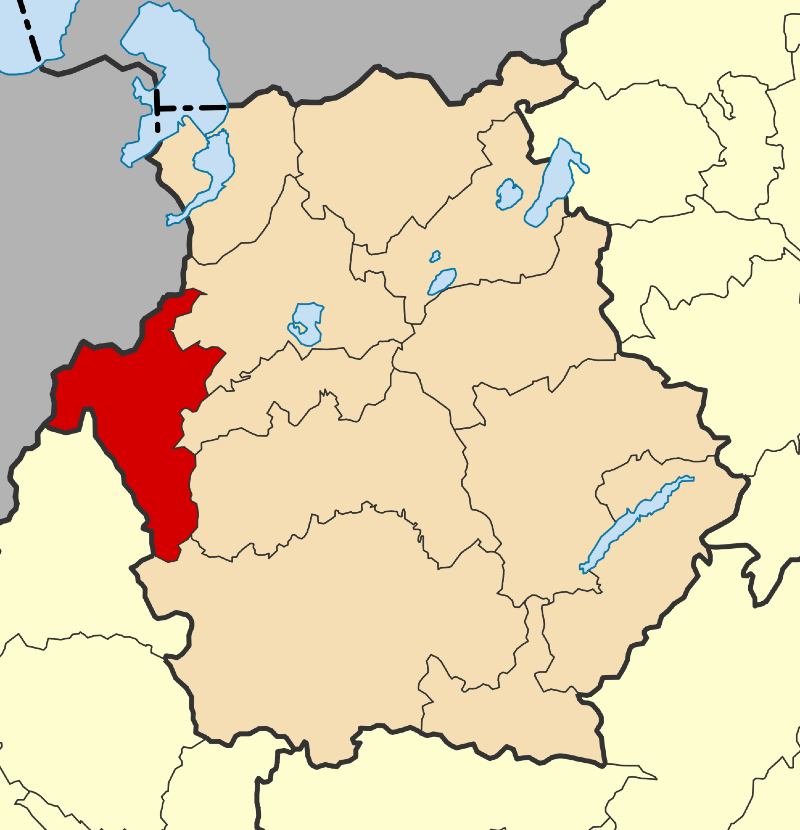

- Location within Greece
- Coordinates: 40°24′N 21°3′E
- Country: Greece
- Geographic region: Macedonia
- Administrative region: Western Macedonia
- Regional unit: Kastoria

Government
  - Mayor: Christos Gkosliopoulos (since 2019)

Area
  - Municipality: 616.1 km^{2} (237.9 sq mi)
  - Municipal unit: 336.3 km^{2} (129.8 sq mi)
- Highest elevation: 1,700 m (5,600 ft)
- Lowest elevation: 900 m (3,000 ft)

Population (2021)
  - Municipality: 2,149
  - Density: 3.488/km^{2} (9.034/sq mi)
  - Municipal unit: 1,184
  - Municipal unit density: 3.521/km^{2} (9.118/sq mi)
  - Community: 761
- Time zone: UTC+2 (EET)
  - Summer (DST): UTC+3 (EEST)
- Postal code: 520 51
- Vehicle registration: AT
- Website: www.nestorio.gr

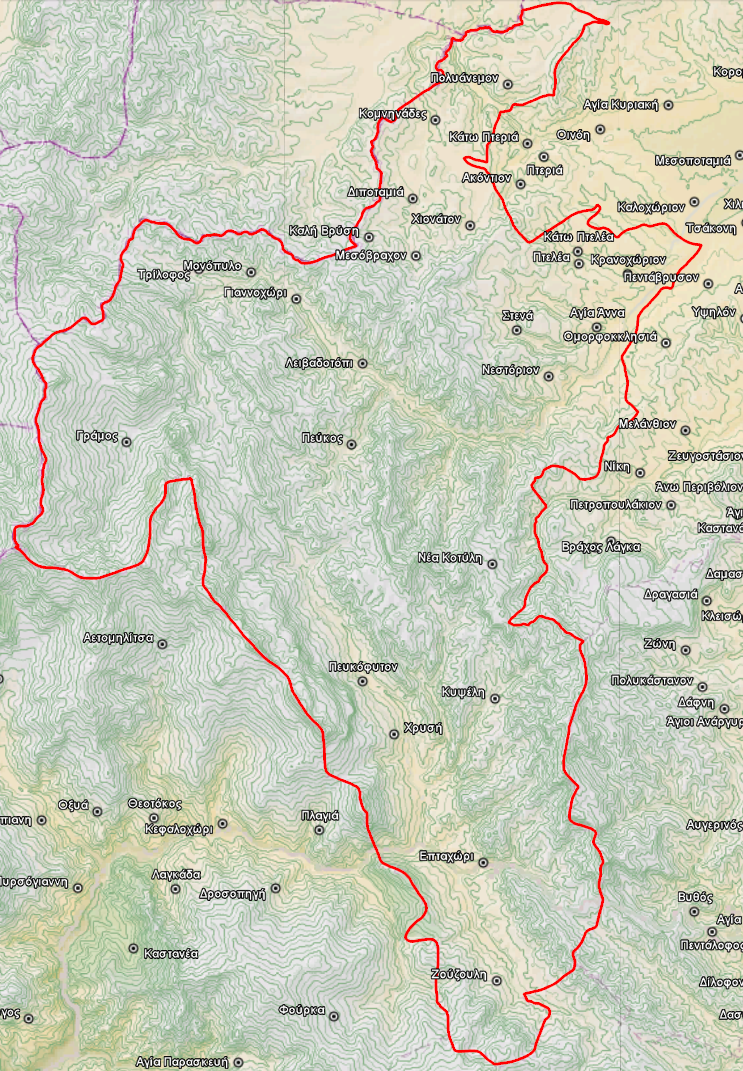
Map

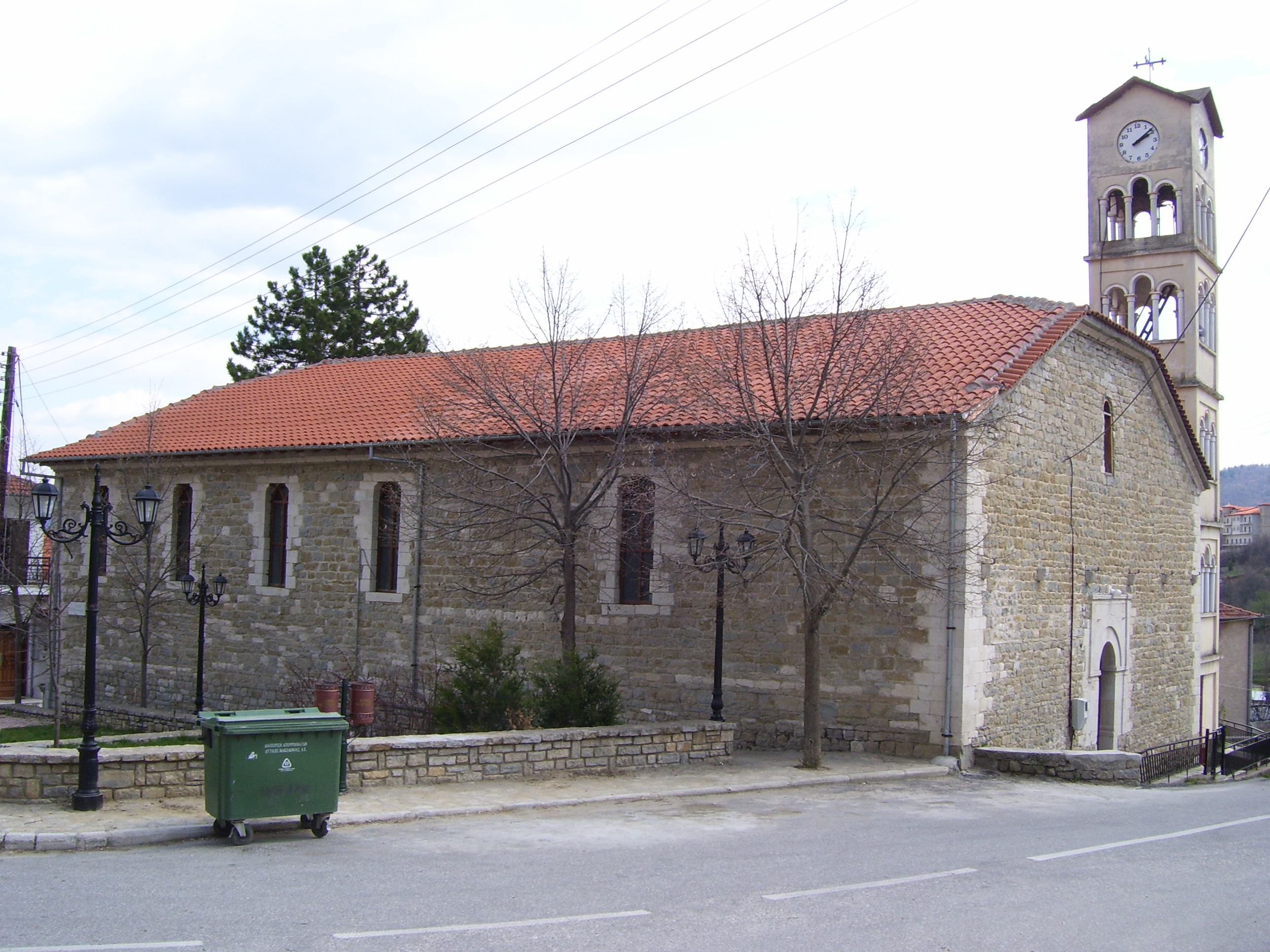
A church in the village

Nestorio (Greek: Νεστόριο, Nestório; Macedonian: Нестрам and Bulgarian: Нестрам, Nestram or Нѐсрам, Nésram) is a village and a municipality in the Kastoria regional unit of Western Macedonia, Greece. Nestorio is approximately 28 km (17 mi) southwest of Kastoria, at the banks of the river Aliakmon.

== Municipality ==
The municipality Nestorio was formed at the 2011 local government reform by the merger of the following 4 former municipalities, that became municipal units:

- Akrites
- Arrenes
- Gramos
- Nestorio

The municipality has an area of 616.072 km^{2}, the municipal unit 336.326 km^{2}.

=== Subdivisions ===
The municipal unit of Nestorio is divided into the following communities:

- Kypseli
- Kotyli (Nea Kotyli)
- Nestorio (Agia Anna, Giannochori, Livadotopi, Monopylo, Nestorio, Pefkos, Stena, Trilofos)
- Ptelea (Kato Ptelea, Kranochori, Ptelea)

== History ==
The area was ruled by the Ottoman Empire until the Balkan Wars of 1912–13, in the late 19th and early 20th century as part of Manastir Vilayet. The population of Nestram consisted of an older local Slavic speaking population and a small Aromanian population that originated from the nearby village of Linotopi on the Gramos mountains that were later assimilated by the Slavonic villagers. At the beginning of the twentieth century, in Nestram there were 16 Aromanian speaking families and 455 Slavic speaking families. Nestram had 2,700 inhabitants in the beginning of the 20th century and most of them were Slavophone (Slavic speaking) Orthodox Christians and a few of them Aromanians. In the early 20th century the majority of the inhabitants of Nestram accepted the rule of the Bulgarian Exarchate. According to the statistics of Vasil Kanchov (Macedonia. Ethnography and Statistics) the inhabitants of Nestram in 1900 were Bulgarians. The population during the Turkish occupation exceeded 5200+ inhabitants.

Nestram, along with the rest of southern Macedonia, was incorporated into Greece in 1913 following the Balkan Wars. The village was known as Nestrami (Greek: Νεστράμι) until 1926 when it was renamed as Agios Nestor (Greek: Άγιος Νέστωρ). In 1928, the village received its current Greek name Nestorion (Greek: Νεστόριον).

In 1945, Greek Foreign Minister Ioannis Politis ordered the compilation of demographic data regarding the Prefecture of Kastoria. The village Nestorio had a total of 2000 inhabitants, and was populated by 1300 Slavophones without a Bulgarian national consciousness.

In the modern period, the village is Slavic speaking with a Greek orientation. Field work conducted recently showed only a rudimentary competence in Slavic among the village's inhabitants.

== Culture ==
The village holds an annual rock festival in late-July, called 'River Party'. River Party started in 1978. The bands come from the Greek rock scene, especially from Athens and Thessaloniki and with foreign guests, including from the wider region.

== Population ==
Year	Community	Municipal unit	Municipality
1981	1,233	-	-
1991	1,158	1,928	-
2001	1,214	1,782	-
2011	964	1,411	2,646
2021	761	1,184	2,149

== Notable people ==
- Georgios Ntoutsis, revolutionary in Macedonian Revolution of 1878
- Keraca Visulčeva, artist
- Paul Afkos, Greek–Australian businessman
