= Sfika =

- Settlement
- Location within Greece
- Coordinates: 40°42′44″N 21°08′52″E
- Country: Greece
- Administrative region: Western Macedonia
- Regional unit: Florina
- Municipality: Prespes
- Municipal unit: Prespes
- Community: Karyes
- Time zone: UTC+2 (EET)
  - Summer (DST): UTC+3 (EEST)

Sfika (Greek: Σφήκα, before 1926: Μπεσφίνα – Besfina; Bulgarian and Macedonian: Бесвина, Besvina) was a village in Florina Regional Unit, Macedonia, Greece. It was part of the community of Karyes. The village had an altitude of 1,180 m (3,870 ft).

The inhabitants of the village were masons. Among them in Besfina were master builders and carpenters who worked seasonally in the surrounding villages, in Bitola district and the wider region of Western Macedonia, Serbia, Turkey, the Greek islands and Athens. Limited arable land and difficult living conditions of the late Ottoman era and early Greek period made some villagers immigrate to Toronto, Canada. The Besfina immigrants in Toronto participated in the early Bulgarian community to build church infrastructure.

The population was 318 in 1920 and 322 in 1928. Sfika was a Slavic Macedonian village. A visit by the Florina district governor in 1929 reported of "anti–state sentiments" in the village along with resentment toward the government and taxes.

The population of Sfika was 294 in 1940. In the Greek Civil War, the village was occupied by the Democratic Army of Greece (DAG).

Sfika—known to its indigenous Aegean Macedonian inhabitants as Besvina—was subsequently destroyed during military offensives by the Hellenic National Army and the Royal Hellenic Air Force in the Vitsi–Prespes sector. In 1948, amid escalating military assaults on Slavic Macedonian mountain villages in Western Macedonia, the village's children were evacuated across the northern border to Eastern European countries as child refugees (Deca Begalci), resulting in the separation of families for years or decades.

Between 1948 and August 1949, Greek government forces subjected the Prespes and Vitsi regions to sustained heavy artillery shelling and aerial bombardments, including the deployment of napalm and incendiary munitions. According to historical accounts of the region, these bombardments destroyed Besvina's homes, infrastructure, and church, driving out the remaining population of approximately 77 families. Following the war, the surviving inhabitants were forced into permanent exile in Yugoslavia and the Eastern Bloc, stripped of their Greek citizenship and property under postwar Greek decrees, and barred from returning to their homeland. By the 1951 Greek census, Sfika was completely depopulated and mentioned for the last time, with only ruins remaining.
