= Extreme points of North Macedonia =

This is a list of the extreme points of North Macedonia: the points that are farther north, south, east or west than any other location, as well as the highest and lowest points.

== Altitude ==
- Maximum: Golem Korab at 2764 m
- Minimum: Vardar River at 50 m

== Other features ==
- Southernmost settlement: Dolno Dupeni, Resen Municipality
- Northernmost settlement: Luke, Kriva Palanka Municipality
- Easternmost settlement: Spikovo, Pehčevo Municipality
- Westernmost settlement: Konjari, Debar Municipality

== See also ==
- Extreme points of Europe
- Extreme points of Earth
