= Oxya, Florina =

Oxya
- Settlement
- Location within Greece
- Coordinates: 40°44′25″N 21°7′54″E
- Country: Greece
- Administrative region: Western Macedonia
- Regional unit: Florina
- Municipality: Prespes
- Municipal unit: Prespes
- Community: Karyes

Population (2021)
  - Total: 12
- Time zone: UTC+2 (EET)
  - Summer (DST): UTC+3 (EEST)

Oxya (Greek: Οξυά, before 1926: Μπούκοβο – Boukovo, also: Μπούκοβικ, Boukovik; Macedonian: Буковик, Bukovik) is a village in Florina Regional Unit, Western Macedonia, Greece. It is part of the community of Karyes.

The name of the village is derived from the Slavic word buka for beech tree and the suffix forms ov and ik. The architecture of Oxya consists of houses built from bricks. The modern village economy is based on agriculture and lumbering.

The population of Oxya was 131 in 1920, 133 in 1928 and 147 in 1940. Oxya was one of several logistic hubs for supplies from Albania used by Democratic Army of Greece (DAG) during the Greek Civil War. In November 1949, Charles Schermerhorn, a UN social worker present in the region during the civil war described Oxya as a well built village with large houses. The village was depopulated as DAG guerillas had relocated 120 families to Albania including their animals and possessions. Buildings in Oxya were mainly intact and communist slogans were painted on them in both Bulgarian and Greek. Schermerhorn stated 74 children were taken from the village by DAG.

Oxya, a Slavic Macedonian village was abandoned in 1951 due to the impacts of the Second World War and the civil war. In the depopulated Lake Prespa border zone, some nomadic transhumant Aromanians (Arvanitovlachs) were settled by the Greek government in Oxya during the 1950s and form part of the population. Oxya had 25 inhabitants in 1981 and 12 in 2011. The modern village population is small and in decline.
