= Pyxos =

- Settlement
- Location within Greece
- Coordinates: 40°45′15″N 21°00′10″E
- Country: Greece
- Administrative region: Western Macedonia
- Regional unit: Florina
- Municipality: Prespes
- Municipal unit: Prespes
- Community: Vrontero
- Time zone: UTC+2 (EET)
  - Summer (DST): UTC+3 (EEST)

Pyxos (Greek: Πυξός, before 1928: Ράχωβα – Rachova, also Όροβον, Orovon; Macedonian: Орово, Orovo) was a village in Florina Regional Unit, Western Macedonia, Greece. It was part of the community of Vrontero. The village was located near the Albanian border and had an altitude of 1,080 m (3,540 ft).

== History ==
The name Orovo is derived from the Slavic word orev for walnut and the suffix ovo. During the Ottoman period, the village supported the Internal Macedonian Revolutionary Organization and its inhabitants participated as fighters in the Ilinden Uprising (1903). The village economy was based on agriculture, involving ploughing and threshing alongside other activities such as fishing, beekeeping, gardening or coal mining.

In 1920, the population numbered 373. Under Greece, assimilationist policies effected the village. Slavic inscriptions were removed from the village church of St. Nicholas and the population experienced harassment. The population was 431 people in 1928. A visit by the Florina district governor in 1929 reported of "anti–state sentiments" in the village. By 1938, the government of Greek Prime Minister Ioannis Metaxas prohibited the use of the Slavic language and many village inhabitants immigrated abroad, often to Perth in Western Australia. Resentment of the language bans arose among remaining villagers.

The population was 489 people in 1940. In the Second World War, a communist organisation was established in Pyxos during June 1943 and Yugoslav partisans from across the border gave assistance to the locals. The partisans were well received by the villagers as they were from the same ethnic and linguistic background.

In the Greek Civil War, the village was occupied by the Democratic Army of Greece (DAG). Greek communists made Pyxos for a time the seat of their self declared temporary government. As an operational base for DAG, the communists in Pyxos maintained a weapons depot, had an officers' school, ran a hospital serving the Vitsi region and published communist newspapers along with propaganda material. DAG retreated through Albania to Pyxos in August 1948 following their defeat by Greek government forces on Mount Grammos and their organisation's General Command reestablished itself in the village. Toward the end of the civil war, the Greek Air Force bombed Pyxos and the population fled to the border resulting in some casualties. The village was destroyed.

At first the inhabitants expected to return to Pyxos, later they went into exile. In 1951, Pyxos was depopulated and the last time mentioned in the Greek census. Orovo and Its Folks in the Past, a book about the village was composed by the Institute of National History of Yugoslavia and a refugee association in Skopje whose members were children when they went to Yugoslavia. The diaspora in Australia later funded an English translation. Pyxos was neither rebuilt or resettled and became abandoned, as ruins of homes and their foundations remain while people from neighbouring villages maintain the church of Saint Nicholas, the only surviving structure. Most of the population of Pyxos and their descendants live in Perth. The village diaspora has established immigrants' clubs for community socialising and gatherings.
