= Greece–North Macedonia border =

Border between Greece and North Macedonia

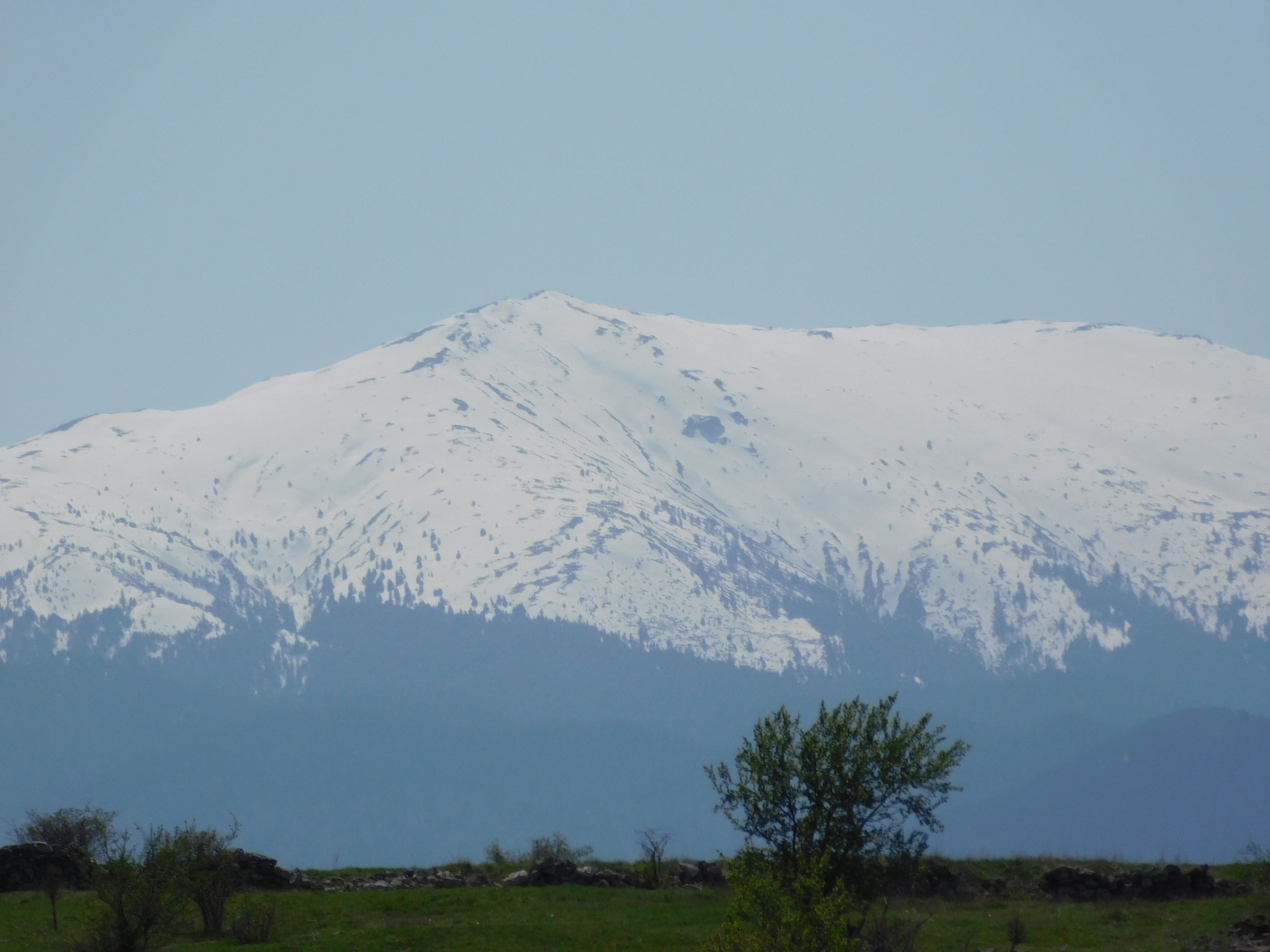
Kajmakčalan Mountain at the border

The Greece–North Macedonia border separates Greece and the Republic of North Macedonia in Southeast Europe. It has a length of 234 km (145 mi). It was marked with the Treaty of Bucharest on 10 August 1913. The border starts from the tripoint with Albania in Lake Prespa. It continues in a straight line eastwards across the lake and then continues across the watershed of the Voras Mountains, where it turns north-eastwards before entering the valley of Vardar river. The boundary continues eastwards and then turns north across the Doiran Lake, before it reaches the watershed between the Strumica and Struma rivers finally reaching the tripoint with Bulgaria on the Tumba Peak.

== Border crossings ==
There are currently three functioning border crossings between the two countries, with a fourth one in planning. The following is a table of the crossing points, listed from West to East:

(Greece) Greek checkpoint	Municipality	(North Macedonia) North Macedonian checkpoint		Route in Greece	Route in North Macedonia	Status
Laimos	Prespes	Markova Noga	Resen		R-1308	CLOSED, opening scheduled for 2027
Agia Paraskevi	Florina	Dragoš	Bitola	local road	local road	CLOSED
Niki	Florina	Medžitlija	Bitola			Open
Evzonoi	Paionia	Bogorodica	Gevgelija			Open
Doirani	Kilkis	Star Dojran	Dojran	local road	R-1105	Open

== See also ==
- North Macedonia border barrier
