= Agathoto =

- Settlement
- Location within Greece
- Coordinates: 40°42′53″N 21°2′49″E
- Country: Greece
- Administrative region: Western Macedonia
- Regional unit: Florina
- Municipality: Prespes
- Municipal unit: Prespes
- Community: Vrontero
- Time zone: UTC+2 (EET)
  - Summer (DST): UTC+3 (EEST)

Agathoto (Greek: Αγκαθωτό, before 1927: Τύρνοβον – Tyrnovon, also Τέρνοβο, Ternovo) was a village in Florina Regional Unit, Macedonia, Greece. It was part of the community of Vrontero.

Tyrnovo was located close to the Greek–Albanian border and within the Prespa Lakes region. The church of St. George was built in 1869. In the early 20th century, the village was within the kaza (district) of Görice and the inhabitants belonged to the Bulgarian Exarchate. Between 1912 and 1928, the population numbered 100. The village was abandoned due to war and only ruins remain.
