= Pyli, Florina =

Pyli Πύλη
- Settlement
- Location within Greece
- Coordinates: 40°46′36″N 21°2′2″E
- Country: Greece
- Administrative region: West Macedonia
- Regional unit: Florina
- Municipality: Prespes
- Municipal unit: Prespes
- Community: Agios Achilleios

Population (2021)
  - Total: 65
- Time zone: UTC+2 (EET)
  - Summer (DST): UTC+3 (EEST)

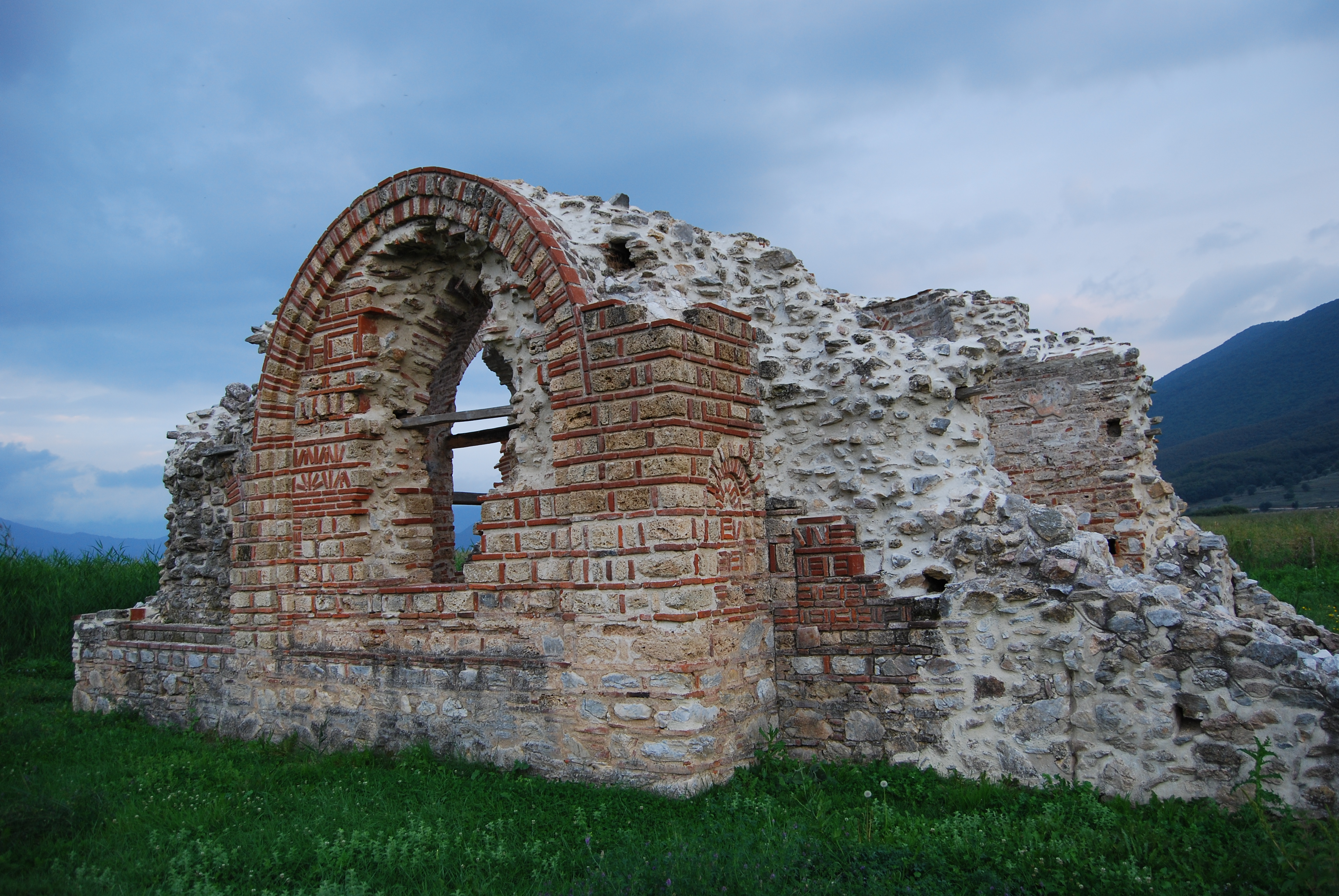
Ruins in Pyli

Pyli (Greek: Πύλη, before 1926: Βίνενι – Vineni) is a village in the Florina Regional Unit in West Macedonia, Greece. It is part of the community of Agios Achilleios.

== Name ==
The toponym Винени, Vineni is composed of the suffix –eni and the Slavic word for wine, vino. In Albanian, the village is called Vinan.

== Demographics ==
Until 1860, the village had a Slavonic population and a church of Sveti Ǵorǵi (Saint George). The village became inhabited by Muslim Albanians, numbering some 155 in 1900 and the expelled Slavonic population went to live in Medovo (modern Mileon). At the time, Vineni was moved to a higher location due to bad climatic conditions.

The 1920 Greek census recorded 202 people in the village, and 202 inhabitants (36 families) were Muslim in 1923. The Albanian village population was present until 1926 and were replaced with prosfiges (Greek refugees), due to the Greek–Turkish population exchange. In Vineni, Greek refugee families were from Asia Minor (18) and four others from an unidentified location in 1926. The 1928 Greek census recorded 173 village inhabitants. In 1928, the refugee families numbered 24 (97 people). During the Greek Civil War, the Greek refugee population fled to nearby Karyes and later other prosfiges (Greek refugees) were brought to repopulate the village.

By the 1950s, the Greek government assisted a group of nomadic transhumant Aromanians (known as the Arvanitovlachs) originating from Thessaly, to settle in depopulated villages of the Prespa region like Pyli. Aromanians are the only inhabitants of the village.

Pyli had 137 inhabitants in 1981. In fieldwork done by anthropologist Riki Van Boeschoten in late 1993, Pyli was populated by Aromanians. The Aromanian language was spoken in the village by people over 30 in public and private settings. Children understood the language, but mostly did not use it.
