= Trigono, Florina =

Trigono
- Settlement
- Location within Greece
- Coordinates: 40°47′10″N 21°14′56″E
- Country: Greece
- Administrative region: Western Macedonia
- Regional unit: Florina
- Municipality: Prespes
- Municipal unit: Prespes
- Community: Antartiko

Population (2021)
  - Total: 26
- Time zone: UTC+2 (EET)
  - Summer (DST): UTC+3 (EEST)

Trigono (Greek: Τρίγωνο, before 1927: Όστιμα – Ostima, Macedonian: Оштима, Oštima) is a village in Florina Regional Unit, Western Macedonia, Greece. The village has an altitude of 980 m (3,220 ft). It is part of the community of Antartiko.

Trigono is located in the Korestia area and situated in mountainous terrain. The church of St. Nicholas is located in the village. The architecture of Trigono consists of houses built from bricks. The modern village economy is based on lumbering, agriculture and tourism.

A Christian village, the inhabitants were members of the Bulgarian Exarchate. Between 1912 and 1928, the village population was 420. Reliant on agricultural activities and some remittances from immigrants abroad, the average yearly family income of the village in the late interwar period was 10,700 drachmas.

The population of Trigono was 482 in 1940. In the Greek Civil War, the village was occupied by the Democratic Army of Greece (DAG). Trigono was part of a logistics supply route from Albania used by DAG during the civil war. The village was bombed. Aged 12 and under, in early 1948 some 40 children at Trigono were escorted to Yugoslavia by the head of the village and their mothers who later went back to Greece. In the late 1950s, several exiled children returned to the village from Eastern European countries.

The population of Trigono, a Slavic Macedonian village was reduced by 88 percent due to the impacts of the Second World War and the civil war. The inhabitants numbered 56 in 1951, 67 in 1961, 27 in 1981 and 29 in 2011. In the early 21st century Trigono is nearly abandoned. Villagers are Dopioi ("locals") and also Macedonians. The modern village population is small and in decline. A large diaspora from the village resides in Toronto, Canada. Some community members have participated in Greek patriotic celebrations in Canada.

== Transport ==
Trigono is near the intersection of the EO2 and EO15 national roads: both routes share the same road, from Trigono towards Vatochori.
