= Mileon =

- Settlement
- Location within Greece
- Coordinates: 40°49′30″N 21°8′1″E
- Country: Greece
- Administrative region: Western Macedonia
- Regional unit: Florina
- Municipality: Prespes
- Municipal unit: Prespes
- Community: Laimos

Population (2021)
  - Total: 5
- Time zone: UTC+2 (EET)
  - Summer (DST): UTC+3 (EEST)

Mileon (Greek: Μηλεών, before 1926: Μέδοβον – Medovon, between 1926 and 1949: Μηλιώνας – Milionas; Macedonian: Медово, Medovo) is a village in Florina Regional Unit, Western Macedonia, Greece. It is part of the community of Laimos.

The toponym has its basis in the local culture of the village and is derived from med the Slavic word for honey, as the inhabitants had beehives for bees. Some of the architecture of Mileon consists of houses built from bricks, many abandoned, in disrepair and covered in vegetation and others are stone houses. Agriculture and livestock formed the village economy. In the 1990s, the soils in the surrounding hills of Mileon had undergone extensive soil erosion, due to agricultural and grazing over use.

The population of the village was 152 in 1920, 161 in 1928 and 209 in 1940. In the period of the Greek Civil War, villagers were all Slavophones with a Macedonian national consciousness, some participated in the conflict due to hopes of an autonomous or independent Macedonia promised by Tito or the Greek communists. Mileon suffered during the conflict and to avoid defeat, the inhabitants fled the village to Yugoslav Macedonia. In 1951, the village was without inhabitants. Following the civil war, only 8 Macedonian families lived in Mileon, the rest of the population were Greeks and Greek refugees.

The village population numbered 27 in 1981 and 1 in 1991. Mileon was deserted in the 1990s. The population numbered 2 in 2011. In the modern period, people with origins from inhabitants who fled Mileon visit in the summer. The village population is small and in decline. The last person from the old population of Mileon died in 2010. Attracted to the local natural landscape, in the late 2010s the residents of Mileon were one retiree family and a young couple working in local environmental conservation. In the mid 2020s, one family involved in ecotourism inhabits the village.
