= Markova Noga =

Geographical point

Coordinates: 40°51′26″N 21°7′10″E

Location of Markova Noga in Macedonia

Markova Noga (Macedonian for Marko's Leg) — locality near the village оf Dolno Dupeni, which is the southernmost point in North Macedonia.

== Border crossing ==
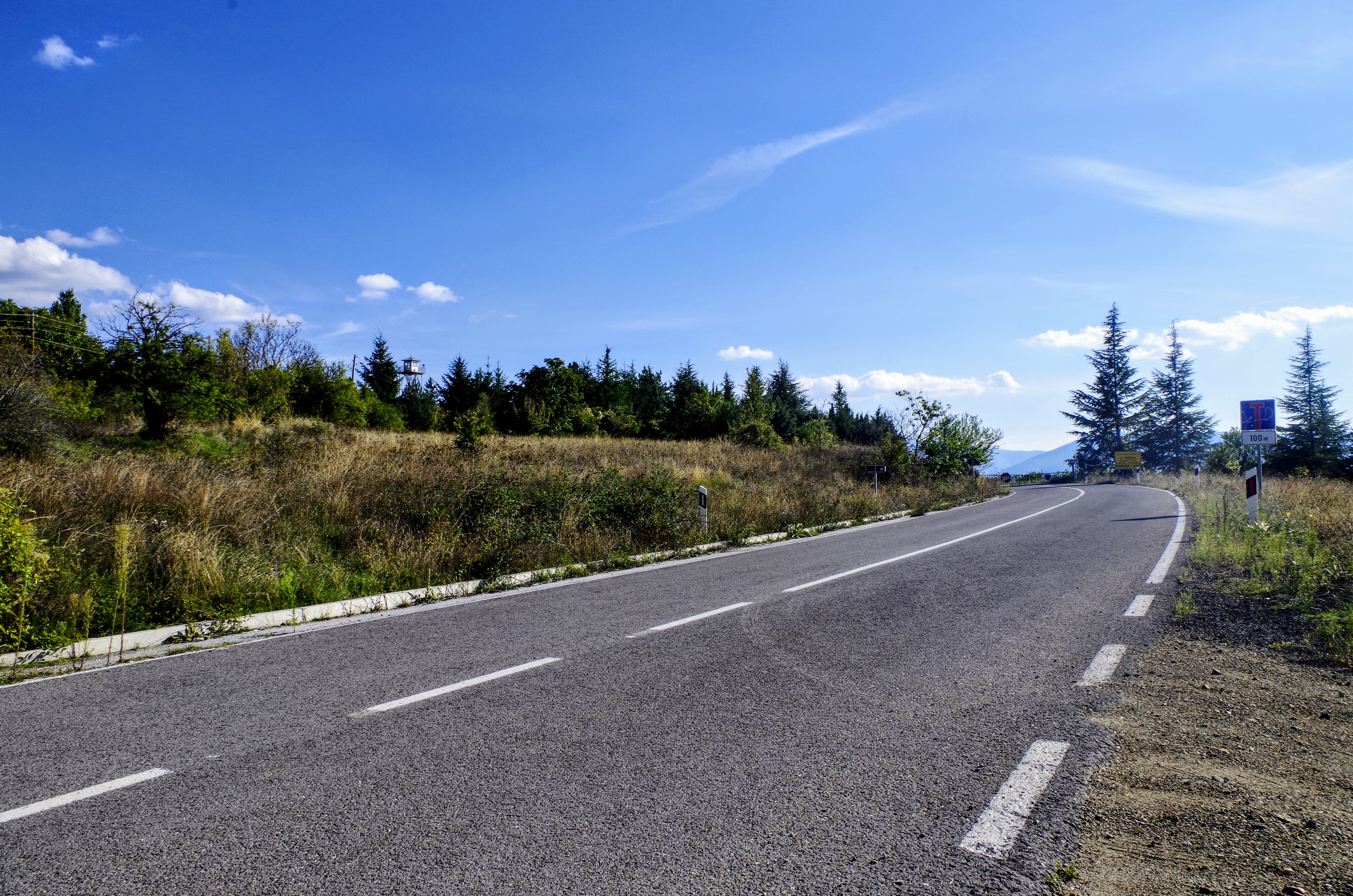
The closed border crossing "Markova Noga".

The border crossing "Markova Noga-German" was opened until the 1960s, when Greece decided to close it completely. For a long time, attempts were made for it to be reopened by the Macedonian authorities, only to be rejected by the Greek authorities. Back in 2006, the Government was fully prepared, both technically and politically for this border crossing to be opened.

The last attempts to reopen this border crossing were made at the meeting of the Ministers of Foreign Affairs of North Macedonia and Greece, Nikola Poposki and Nikos Kotzias, respectively.

As a result of the signing of the Prespa Agreement and the resolution of the name dispute, a greater opportunity was created to open this border crossing, and in March 2019, an agreement was signed for its commissioning.

== A natural rarity ==
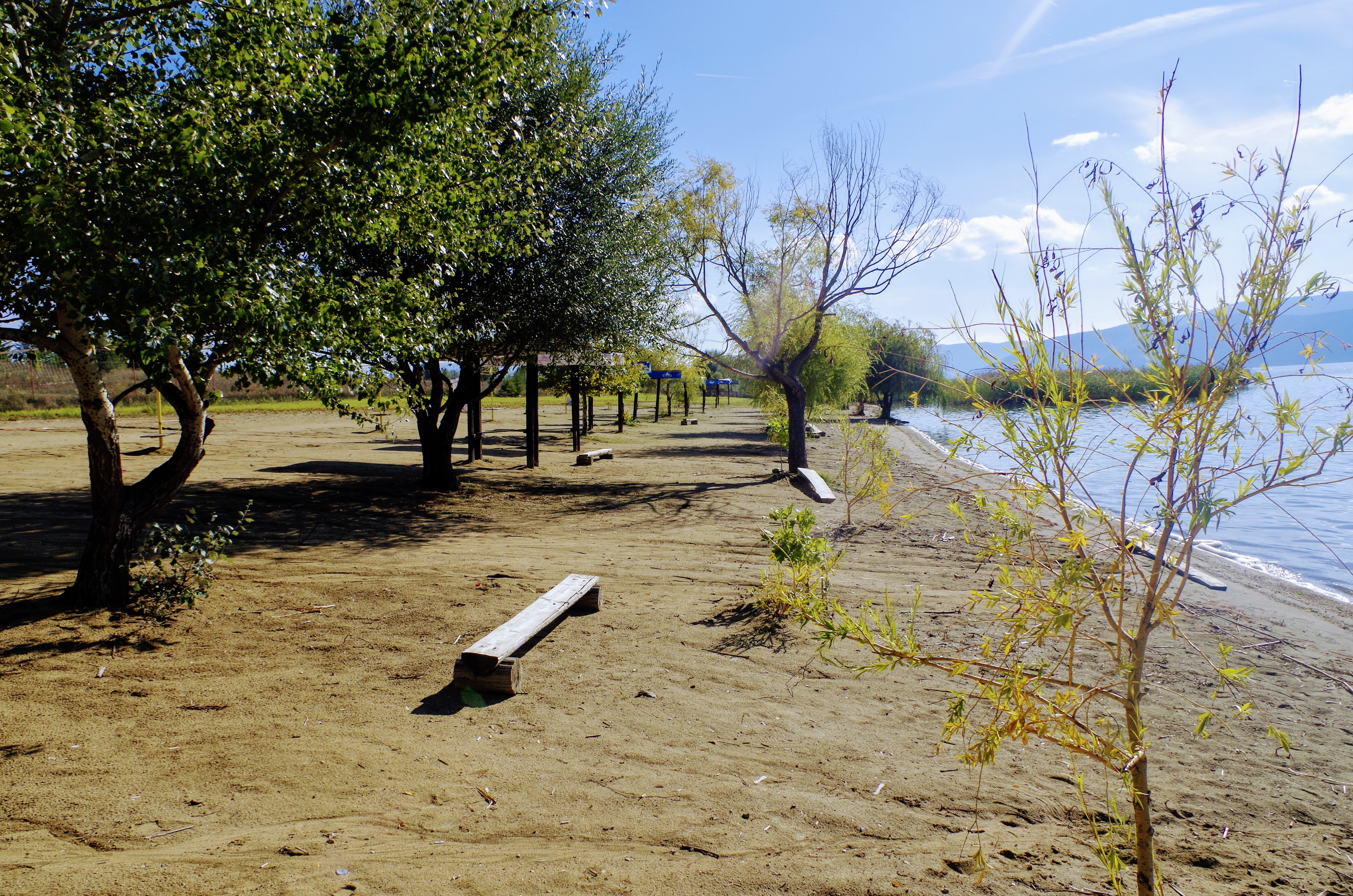
View of Dupeni Beach.

In the locality "Markova Noga", there is a stone ("miracle of nature"), which is believed to have preserved the one meter long footprint of King Marko.

According to the legend told by the locals, many years ago when King Marko was walking along the shore of Lake Prespa, he also wanted to see the Small Prespa Lake so he climbed on a stone — leaving a trace on it.

The stone with Marko's footprint is located in the yard of the watchtower, which bears his name. The officials in the barracks say that all of the people who would like to see the stone can come, but they need to register in advance.

== Beach ==
In the immediate vicinity of the closed border crossing, right next to the shore of the lake, there is the newly opened Dupeni Beach, which extends to the border line with neighboring Greece.
