= Pyli (disambiguation) =

Pyli (Greek: Πύλη) is the name of several geographical locations in Greece:

- Pyli, a municipality in the Trikala regional unit
- Pyli, Boeotia, a village in Beotia
- Pyli, Florina, a village in the Florina (regional unit)
- Pyli, a village on the island of Kos
