= Pelagonia =

Region in North Macedonia and Greece

Coordinates: 41.0000°N 21.3500°E

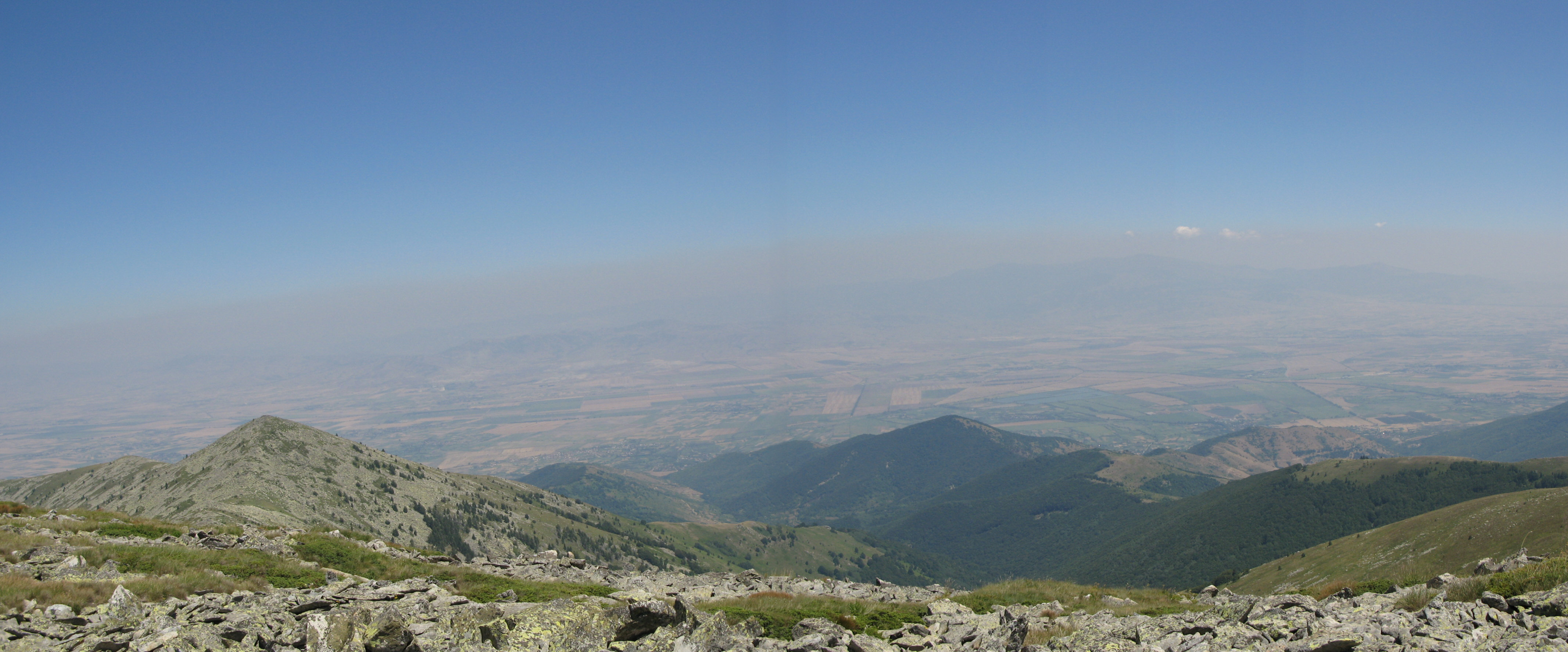
Pelagonia seen from Baba Mountain, Bitola, Pelagonia Statistical Region

Pelagonia (Macedonian: Пелагонија, romanized: Pelagonija; Greek: Πελαγονία, romanized: Pelagonía), also called plain of Pelagonia, is a geographical region of Macedonia shared between North Macedonia and Greece.

== History ==
=== Ancient Pelagonia ===
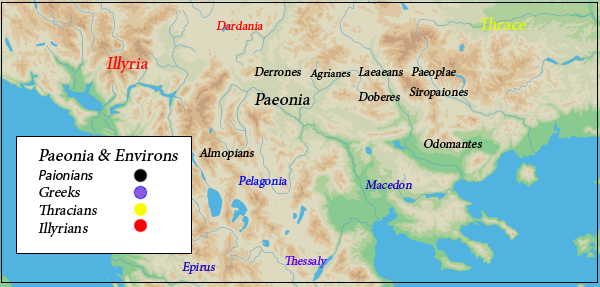
Location of ancient Pelagonia

Ancient Pelagonia was roughly bounded by Paeonia to the north and east, Lynkestis and Almopia to the south and Illyria to the west, in classical antiquity. Pelagonia was also used as a name for the westernmost part of Paeonia, while the north-westernmost part of Pelagonia was referred to as Derriopos. Strabo calls Pelagonia by the name Tripolitis and names only one ancient city of the supposed three in the region; Azorus. Pelagonia roughly corresponded to the present-day municipalities of Prilep, Bitola, Mogila, Novaci, Kruševo, and Krivogaštani in North Macedonia.

The mythological Pelagon, the eponym of the region according to Greek mythology, was son of the river-god Axius (modern Axios or Vardar river) and father of Asteropaeus, a Paeonian leader in Homer's Iliad. Many Mycenaean objects have been found in the area, such as the double axe, later found in Mycenae, and are exhibited in the Museum of Bitola.

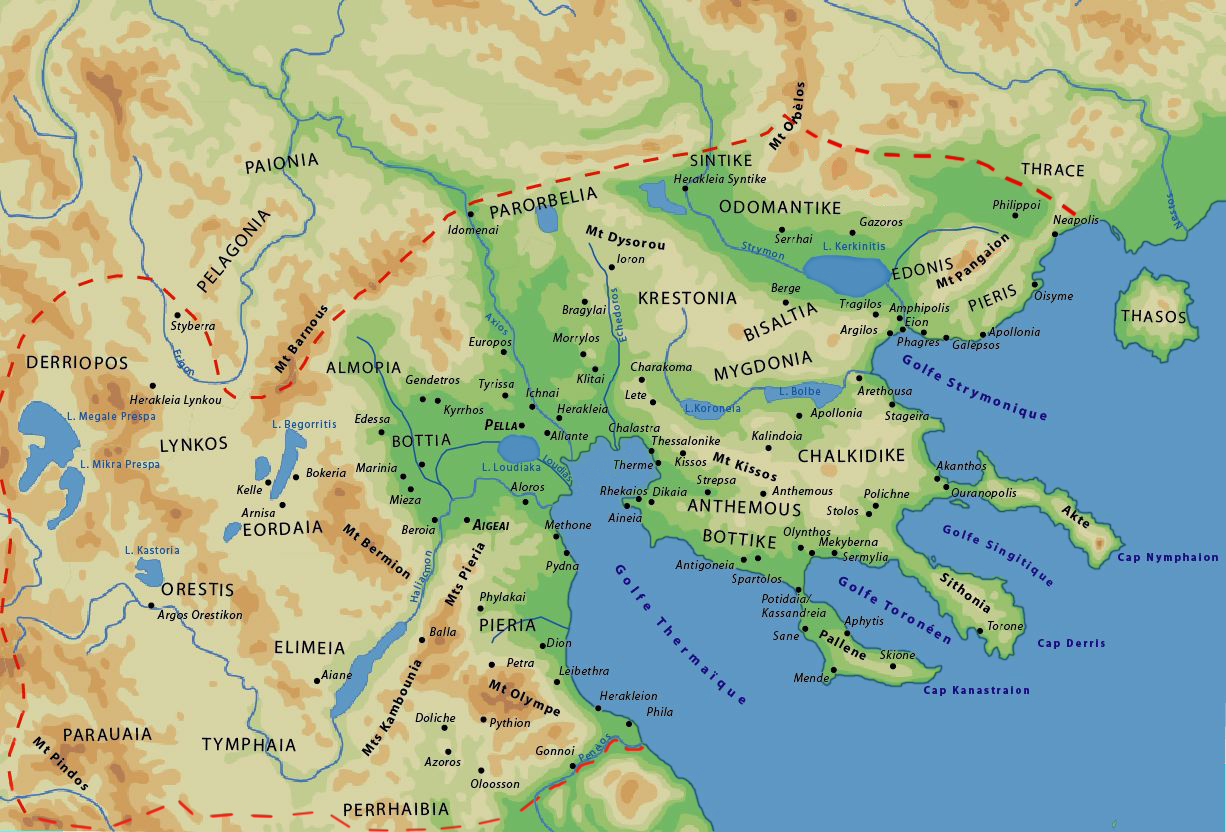
Map of the Kingdom of Macedon with Pelagonia and Derriopos located in the northwest districts of the kingdom

Pelagonia was the homeland of the Pelagones or Pelagonians, an ancient Greek tribe of Upper Macedonia, who were centered at the Pelagonian plain, belonged to the Molossian tribal state or koinon, and spoke a Northwest Greek dialect. Menelaus of Pelagonia (ca. 360 BC), according to Bosworth, fled his kingdom finding refuge and citizenship in Athens, when it was annexed by Philip II to the Macedonian kingdom and became one of its administrative provinces during the 4th century BC.

=== Medieval Pelagonia ===
In medieval times, when the names of Lynkestis and Orestis had become obsolete, Pelagonia acquired a broader meaning. It was contested between the Byzantine and the Bulgarian empires for centuries, before being annexed by the Serbian Empire in the 14th century. After the fragmentation of the Serbian Empire, Pelagonia was part of the Lordship of Prilep up until its conquest by the Ottoman Empire at the end of the 14th century.

==== Battle of Pelagonia ====
The decisive battle of Pelagonia in 1259, between the Byzantines of Nicaea and the Latins, took place in the region during the Struggle for Constantinople (1204–1261). The exact location of the battle has been disputed, as the only clear toponym given in the sources is Boril's Wood (Βορίλλα λόγγος), which has been variously placed by modern researchers close to Prilep, Kastoria, or Bitola which was then known as Pelagonia. Using the sources and the topography to reconstruct the movements of the armies, the modern scholars Freiderikos Rochontzis and Robert Mihajlovski have independently suggested as the battlefield the plain between Florina and Kaimakchalan, north of Kastoria, near the modern settlement of Vevi (formerly known as Banitsa); a strategically important location where the Battle of Lyncestis had been fought in 423 BC and the Battle of Vevi was fought in 1941.

== Pelagonian plain ==
Today, Pelagonia is a plain shared between North Macedonia and Greece. It incorporates the cities of Bitola and Prilep in Pelagonia Statistical Region, in North Macedonia, and the city of Florina in Western Macedonia, in Greece. It is also the location of Medžitlija-Niki, a key border crossing between the two countries.

During the Balkan Wars, the Greek Army captured Florina from the Ottomans in November 1912, and intended to capture the entire Pelagonian plain, including the city of Bitola. However, upon hearing of the Bulgarian advance towards Thessaloniki, the Greek army diverted and marched towards the Macedonian capital, thus leaving the northern Greek border in Pelagonia at the village of Negochani, today, Niki, Greece. As a result, most of the Pelagonian plain was annexed by Serbia and the Monastir Gap was born.

=== Monastir Gap ===
The Monastir Gap is a geographical and historical term referring to the section of the Greece-North Macedonia border at the Pelagonia plain. The gap is named after Monastir, an alternative historical name for Bitola, which is the largest city in the plain. While most of Greece's northern border is marked by geographical barriers such as mountains and lakes, or by narrow, easily defensible valleys, the Monastir Gap is a vast and wide open plain. As a result, it has played a crucial role in various Balkan military campaigns.

In World War I, the Monastir Gap was of major strategic importance. It was the site of significant battles during the Macedonian front, as the Allies and Central Powers fought to control this key route. As one of the few flat areas in the region, control of the gap allowed movement of troops and supplies between Greece, Albania and Serbia. The Monastir Gap was central to the Monastir Offensive, an Allied operation aimed at breaking the stalemate on the Macedonian front.

In April 1941, during the Nazi German-led Operation Marita, the Monastir Gap again became a critical invasion route. German forces, specifically the XL Panzer Corps, advanced through the gap from Yugoslavia into Greece, seizing the town of Florina on 10 April. This maneuver outflanked the Allied defensive positions along the Vermio Mountains, leading to engagements such as the Battle of Vevi on 11–12 April. The rapid German advance through the Monastir Gap compromised the Allied defensive line, contributing to the swift occupation of mainland Greece.

While the Monastir Gap was not the focal point of major battles during the Greek Civil War, its geographical significance persisted. The pass's proximity to the Yugoslav border made it a potential route for the movement of arms and personnel. Control over such border regions was crucial for both the government forces and the Democratic Army of Greece, as they sought to secure supply lines and restrict enemy movements. However, the most intense fighting during the civil war occurred in other mountainous regions of Western Macedonia.

=== Environment ===
==== Important Bird Area ====
A 137,000 ha tract of the plain has been designated an Important Bird Area (IBA) by BirdLife International because it supports populations of ferruginous ducks, white storks, Dalmatian pelicans, Eurasian thick-knees, little owls, Eurasian scops owls, European rollers, lesser kestrels and lesser grey shrikes.

== See also ==
- List of Ancient Greek tribes
- Epirus
- Epirus (ancient state)

== Sources ==
- Mihajlovski, Robert (2006). "The Battle of Pelagonia 1259: A New Look through the March Routes and Topography". Byzantinoslavica. 64: 275–284. ISSN 0007-7712.
- Rochontzis, Freiderikos (1982). "Η αναβίωση του Ελληνισμού και η παρακμή της Φραγκοκρατίας: μάχη της Καστοριάς (1259 μ.Χ.)" [The rebirth of Hellenism and decline of Frankocracy: The Battle of Kastoria (1259 AD)]. Makedonika (in Greek). 22: 340–357. doi:10.12681/makedonika.528. ISSN 0076-289X.
