= Vatochori =

- Community
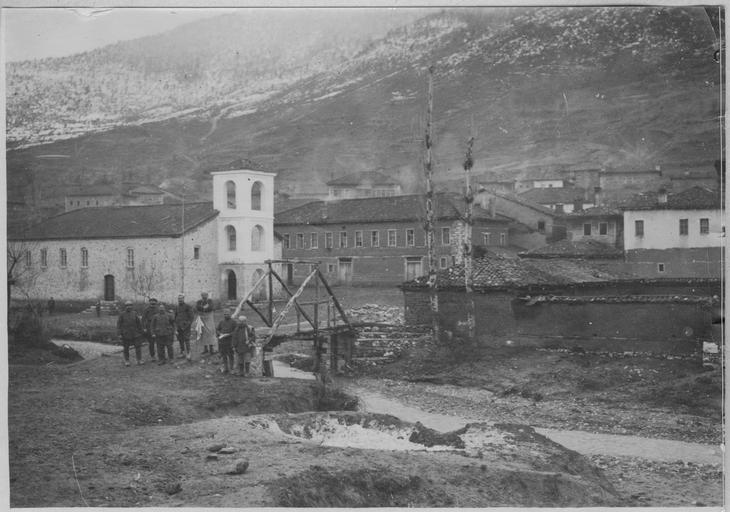

- Location within Greece
- Coordinates: 40°40′14″N 21°8′53″E
- Country: Greece
- Administrative region: Western Macedonia
- Regional unit: Florina
- Municipality: Prespes
- Municipal unit: Prespes
- Community: Vatochori

Population (2021)
  - Community: 10
- Time zone: UTC+2 (EET)
  - Summer (DST): UTC+3 (EEST)

Vatochori (Greek: Βατοχώρι, before 1927: Μπρένιτσα – Brenitsa, Macedonian: Брезница, Breznica) is a community and village in Florina Regional Unit, Western Macedonia, Greece. The village has an altitude of 880 m (2,890 ft).

Vatochori is located in the Korestia area and situated in mountainous terrain. The total land area of the village Vatochori is 3,011 hectares, with a majority as forest, followed by use for agriculture, grasslands and a small remainder for other uses. Some of the architecture of Vatochori consists of stone houses. The modern village economy is based on lumbering, agriculture and livestock.

A Christian village, most of the inhabitants belonged to the Bulgarian Exarchate. In the late nineteenth century, a few Aromanian families also lived in the village. The population numbered 650 in 1912, 877 in 1920 and 605 in 1928. Several families from Vatochori immigrated to Bulgaria. Reliant on agricultural activities and some remittances from immigrants abroad, the average yearly family income of the village in the late interwar period was 10,700 drachmas. The village population numbered 770 in 1940.

In mid–1941 Vatochori along with Slavic Macedonian inhabitants from several villages partook in a celebration commemorating the Battle of Lokvata, fought by Bulgarian revolutionaries (Komitadjis) against Ottoman soldiers in 1903. During the Axis retreat from Greece in World War II, a German military convoy was attacked at Vatochori by guerillas resulting in 2 dead and 32 surrendered. In the Greek Civil War, the village was occupied by the Democratic Army of Greece (DAG).

The population of Vatochori, a Slavic Macedonian village was reduced by 70 percent due to the impacts of the Second World War and the civil war. The population of Vatochori was 232 in 1951, 232 in 1961, 54 in 1981 and 23 in 2011. The inhabitants speak the Dolna Koreshcha variant of the Kostur dialect. The modern village population is small and in decline.

== Transport ==
Vatochori is on the route of the EO2 national road, which intersects with the EO15 about 2.3 kilometres (1.4 miles) east of the village: from the intersection, both routes share the same road towards Trigono.
