= Greek National Road 15 =

Trunk road in Greece

Coordinates: 40.1827°N 21.4975°E

National Road 15
- Εθνική Οδός 15
- Route of the EO15 road, in blue

Route information
- Length: 187.5 km (116.5 mi)
- Existed: 9 July 1963–present

Major junctions
- South end: Mourgani bridge
- North end: Agios Germanos

Location
- Country: Greece
- Regions: Thessaly; Western Macedonia
- Primary destinations: Mourgani bridge; Grevena; Siatista (Bara); Neapoli; Kastoria; Trigono; Agios Germanos

Highway system
- Highways in Greece; Motorways; National roads
← EO14	→ EO16

Greek National Road 15 (Greek: Εθνική Οδός 15), abbreviated as the EO15, is a national road in northern Greece. It connects Agios Germanos, near the border with North Macedonia, with the Greek National Road 6 near Kalampaka. It passes through Kastoria, Siatista and Grevena.

== Route ==
The EO15 is officially defined as a north–south road that runs within northern Thessaly and Western Macedonia: it branches off the EO6 at Mourgani bridge, north west of Kalabaka, and heads north towards Agios Germanos, passing through Grevena, Siatista (Bara), Neapoli, Kastoria and Trigono. The EO15 overlaps with: the EO20, between Siatista and Neapoli; and the EO2, between Vatochori and Trigono.

Today, the A2, A29 and A3 motorways run roughly adjacent to and connect with the EO15, between Mourgani and Kastoria: the EO15 also connects with the EO26, near Agiofyllo.

== History ==
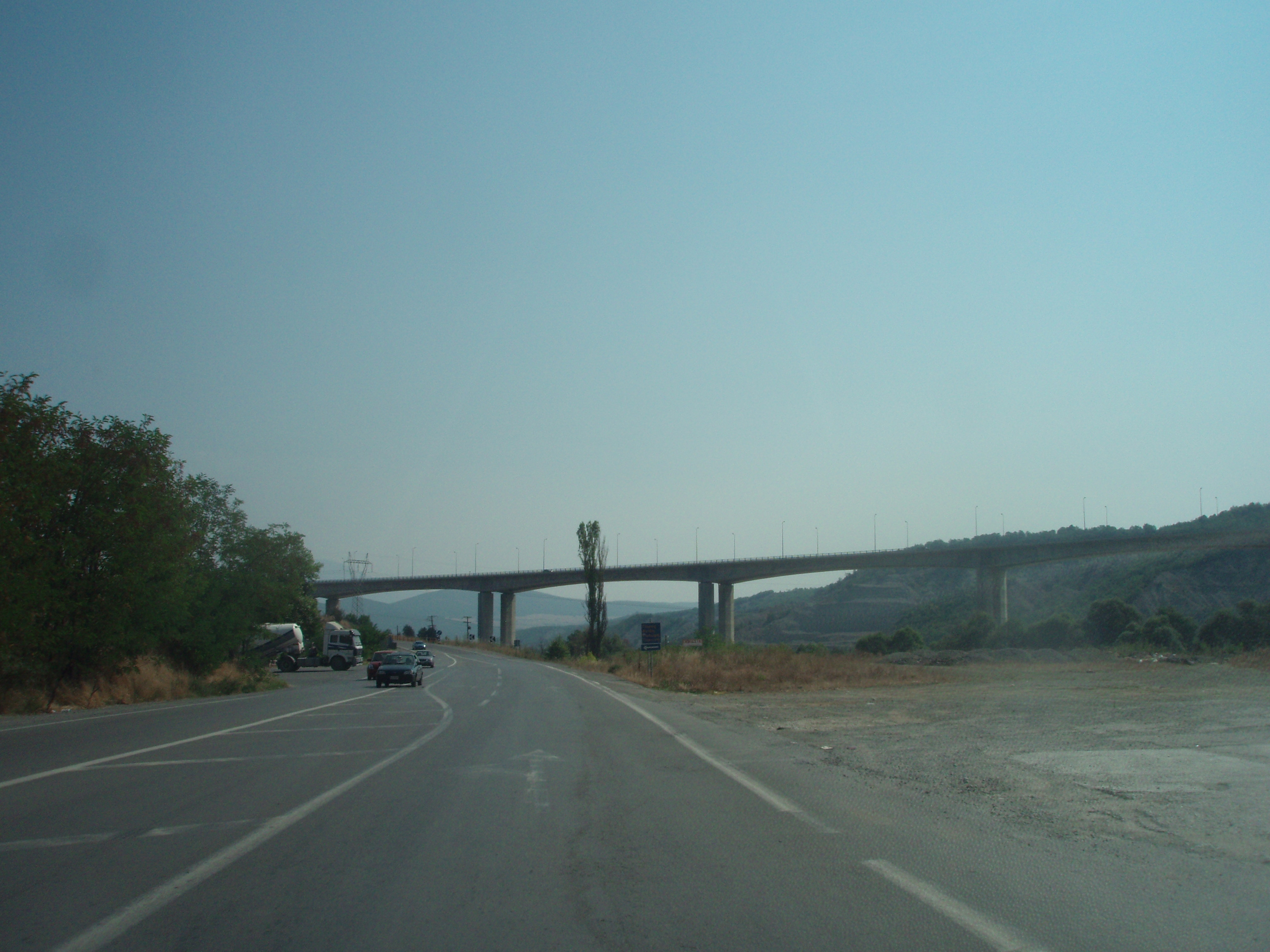
National Road 15 near Grevena. The bridge seen is from the A2 motorway.

Ministerial Decision G25871 of 9 July 1963 created the EO15 from all or part of the following short-lived national roads (listed from south to north), which existed by royal decree from 1955 to 1963:

- The old EO32, from Mourgani bridge to Siatista
- The old EO33, from Siatista to Trigono
- The old EO35, from Trigono to Agios Germanos

== Future plans ==
Near the northern end of the EO15 at Laimos, there are plans to reopen the border crossing with North Macedonia, beside Lake Prespa, reconnecting the national road with the R1308 towards Resen: the border crossing was closed by the Greek junta in May 1967, when North Macedonia was part of socialist Yugoslavia.
