= Agios Achilleios =

Agios Achilleios Άγιος Αχίλλειος
- Community
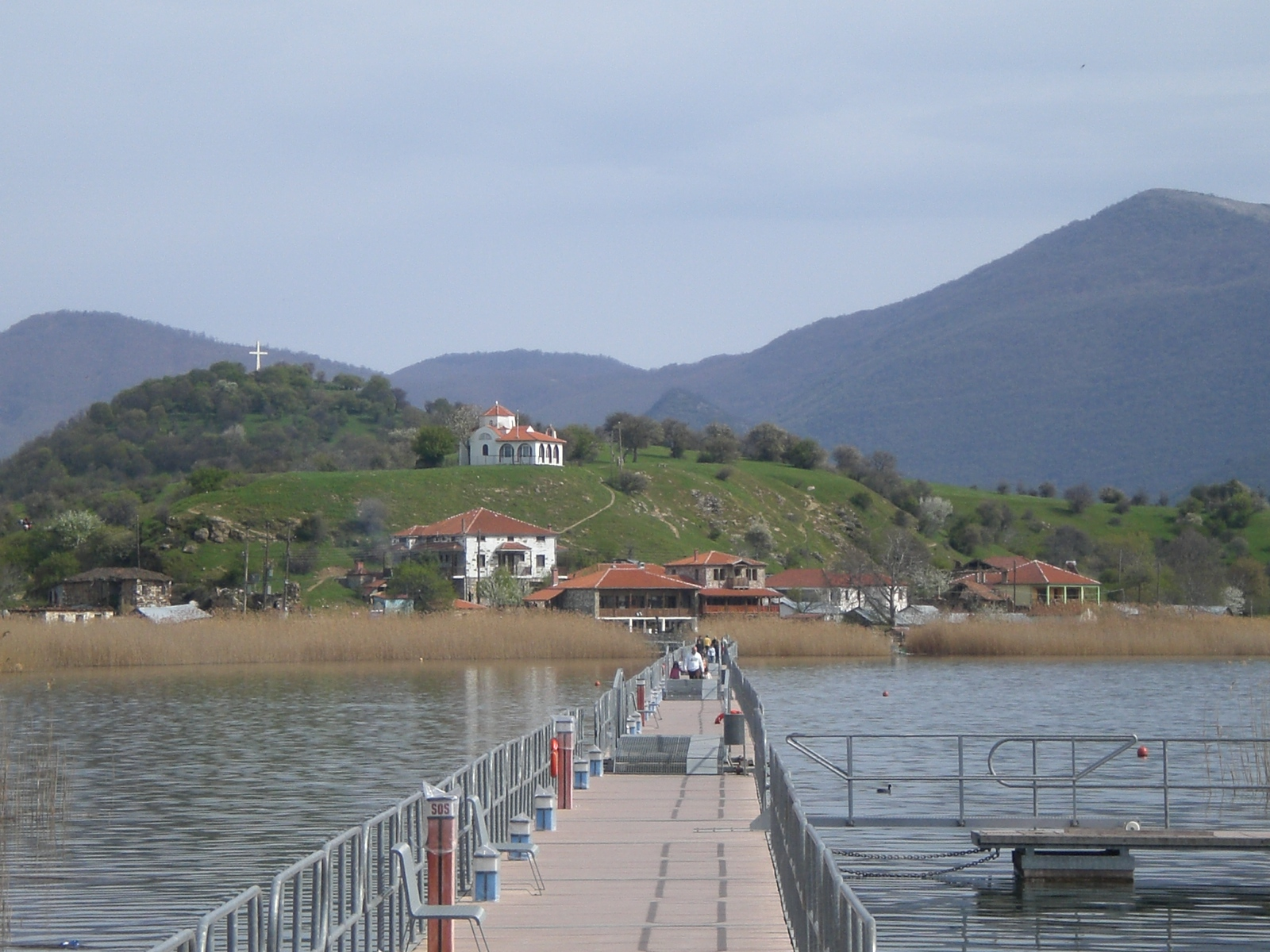

- Location within Greece
- Coordinates: 40°47′18″N 21°4′44″E
- Country: Greece
- Administrative region: Western Macedonia
- Regional unit: Florina
- Municipality: Prespes
- Municipal unit: Prespes

Population (2021)
  - Community: 91
- Time zone: UTC+2 (EET)
  - Summer (DST): UTC+3 (EEST)

Agios Achilleios (Greek: Άγιος Αχίλλειος, before 1926: Αχίλλειον – Achilleion, also: Άιλ, Ail or Άχιλ, Achil; Macedonian: Ахил, Ahil) is a village on an island of the same name in Small Prespa Lake located in the Florina Regional Unit in Western Macedonia, Greece. It is one of two inhabited lake islands in Greece, the other being Ioannina Island. The island's total surface area is 1 km.

The village is located within the Greek Prespa National Park. The total land area of the village Agios Achilleios is 3,581 hectares, split almost between forest and waters under its jurisdiction, followed by grasslands and use for agriculture.

== History ==
For a brief period in the 10th century, the island with its town of Prespa served as the capital of the First Bulgarian Empire under Tsar Samuel. Following the capture of Larissa by Samuel, he ordered the remains of Saint Achillius to be transported from the city to the island and buried in a specially built basilica named after the saint. In 1014, the Bulgarian army was defeated in battle by the Byzantine army of Basil II and Samuel died shortly after and was buried in the basilica. Over time the location became known as Saint Achillius (Agios Achilleios, Sveti Ahil) or simply Achillius (Ahil), after the basilica.

The island became part of Greece in 1913 following the Balkan Wars. In the interwar period, no Greek refugees from the Greek–Turkish population exchange were settled on the island. Greek authorities considered some villagers to have either anti–state, anti–Greek or fluid sentiments.

During the Greek Civil War (1946–1949), inhabitants from village participated in the conflict and in February 1948 Nikos Zachariadis, the Greek Communist Party General Secretary married Roula Koukoulou, his long-time lover on the island. In 1949 many villagers were forced to flee to Yugoslavia and other Eastern Bloc countries due to their wartime involvement. From 1940 to 1951, the population of Agios Achilleios decreased by 67 percent. Queen Frederica of Greece on a national tour went to post civil war Agios Achilleios in 1951 and her visit was marked by Greek patriotic festivities and religious events.

In the late 1960s, Greek archaeological excavations of the basilica identified the remains of Saint Achillius and Tsar Samuel. In 1981, a Greek military helicopter transported the relics of Saint Achillius to Larissa and were reinterred in its cathedral. Samuel's remains which were stored at the University of Thessaloniki. The bishop of Florina in 1971 erected a large cross upon the highest point on the island with an inscription at its base dedicated to "the sacrifices and martyrdom of Greek people". The village was in a sensitive border zone for most of the Cold War and access was inaccessible to non–residents without a special permit.

Agios Achilleios is a heritage site and tourist destination. Some of the architecture of Agios Achilleios consists of old stone houses. A floating bridge connects Agios Achilleios to the mainland. The modern village economy is based on fishery and livestock. Some inhabitants in Agios Achilleios are fishermen. Fish are caught through a traditional local form of fishing called "Pelaizia", it involves fishermen in boats using long sticks to scare, encircle with nets and drive fish toward shoreline traps made of branches. The Prespa Cultural Festival is held yearly on the island in late August. After previous failed attempts, Bulgaria reached an agreement with Greece to acquire the remains of Samuel, which were transferred to Sofia in October 2026.

== Demographics ==
The population of Agios Achilleios was 64 in 1920, 113 in 1928, 100 in 1940 and 31 in 1981. In fieldwork done by anthropologist Riki Van Boeschoten in late 1993, Agios Achilleios was populated by Slavophones. The Macedonian language was spoken in the village by people over 30 in public and private settings. Children understood the language, but mostly did not use it. Agios Achilleios had 21 inhabitants in 2011. The modern village population is small and in decline.
