= Small Prespa Lake =

Lake in Greece and Albania

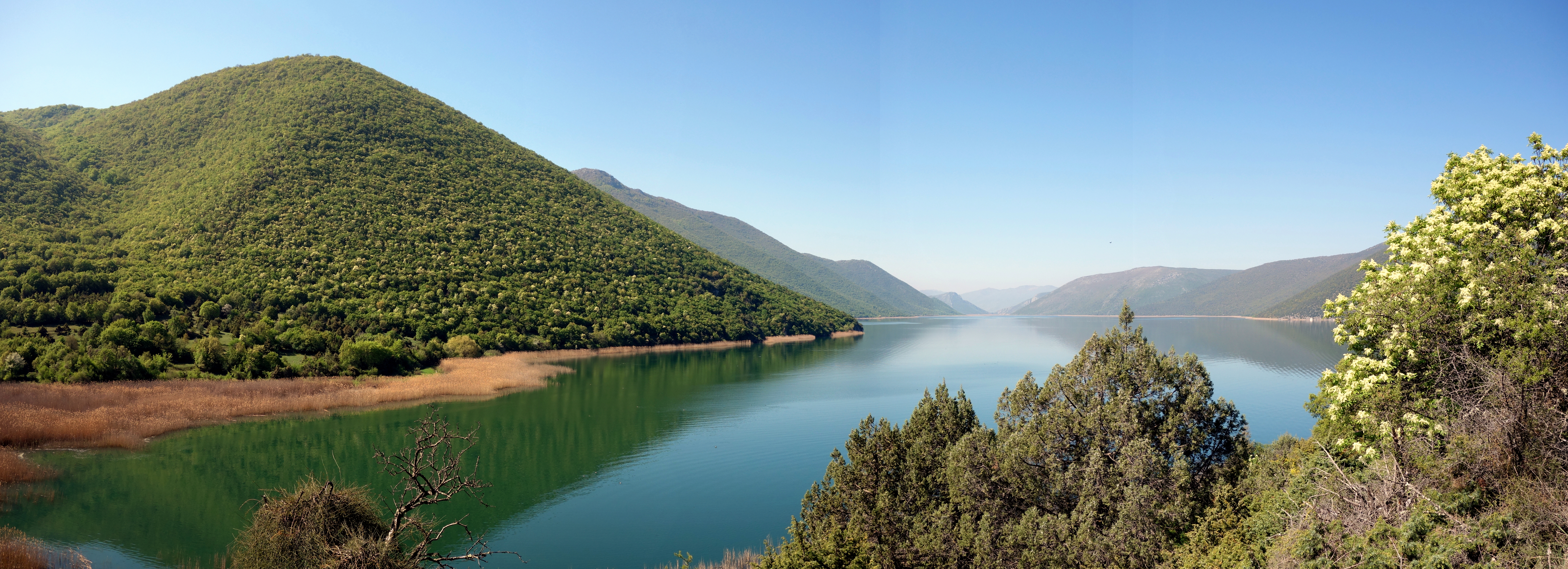
- Small Prespa

- Location within Greece
- Interactive map of Small Prespa Lake
- Location
- Location: Balkans (primarily Greece, Albania – a small part)
- Coordinates: 40°46′N 21°06′E
- Type: tectonic
- Basin countries: Greece, Albania
- Surface area: 46.8 km^{2} (18.1 sq mi)
- Max. depth: 7.7 m (25 ft)
- Surface elevation: 853 m (2,799 ft)
- Islands: Agios Achillios, Vidronisi

Ramsar Wetland
- Official name: Mikri Prespa Lake (Greece)
- Designated: 21 August 1975
- Reference no.: 60

Ramsar Wetland
- Official name: Albanian Prespa Lakes
- Designated: 13 June 2013
- Reference no.: 2151

Small Prespa Lake (Greek: Λίμνη Μικρή Πρέσπα, Limni Mikri Prespa; Albanian: Prespa e Vogël; Macedonian: Мало Преспанско Езеро, Malo Prespansko Ezero) is a lake shared between Greece (138 km² drainage area; 42.5 km² surface area) and Albania (51 km² drainage area; 4.3 km² surface area). It is the smaller of the two Prespa Lakes.

== Details ==
Small Prespa Lake in particular has been recognized as an important wetland ecosystems favoring breeding and feeding of rare water bird species. It is best known for hosting the largest breeding colony of the Dalmatian pelican in the world. The flora in the region is composed of more than 1,500 plant species of which 146 endemic species in the Lake Ohrid and 39 endemic species from the Prespa Lakes.

The villages of Rakickë, Shyec, Buzliqen and Tren surround the Albanian portion of the lake. In Greece the villages surrounding the lake are Agios Germanos, Laimos, Milionas, Platy, Kallithea, Lefkonas, Prespes, Karyes, Mikrolimni, Oxia, Pyli and Vrontero.

During 1970, significant amounts of water from the Devoll river was diverted into the lake with the intention to use it latter during the summer time for the irrigation purposes. Due to the high suspended solids in the river water significant siltation did occur on the Albanian side. The practice has recently stopped. The Albanian part of this lake has a surface of 420 hectares. In 1999 the Society for the Protection of Prespa received the Ramsar Wetland Conservation Award for its conservation efforts regarding the Lake Prespa Ramsar site.

== Agios Achilleios ==
Small Prespa Lake contains the island Agios Achilleios where is a village of the same name Agios Achilleios (Saint Achilleus); For a brief period in the 10th century, the island with its town of Prespa served as the capital of the First Bulgarian Empire under Tsar Samuel. Following the capture of Larissa by Samuel, he ordered the remains of Saint Achillius to be transported from the city to the island and buried in a specially built basilica named after the saint. In 1014, the Bulgarian army was defeated in battle by the Byzantine army of Basil II and Samuel died shortly after and was buried in the basilica. Over time the location became known as Saint Achillius (Agios Achilleios, Sveti Ahil) or simply Achillius (Ahil), after the basilica. In February 1948, in the midst of the Greek Civil War, Nikos Zachariadis, the General Secretary of the Communist Party of Greece, married Roula Koukoulou, his long-time lover, on this island, in a widely publicized ceremony. The island became a tourist and fishing centre in the 1970s.

== Gallery ==
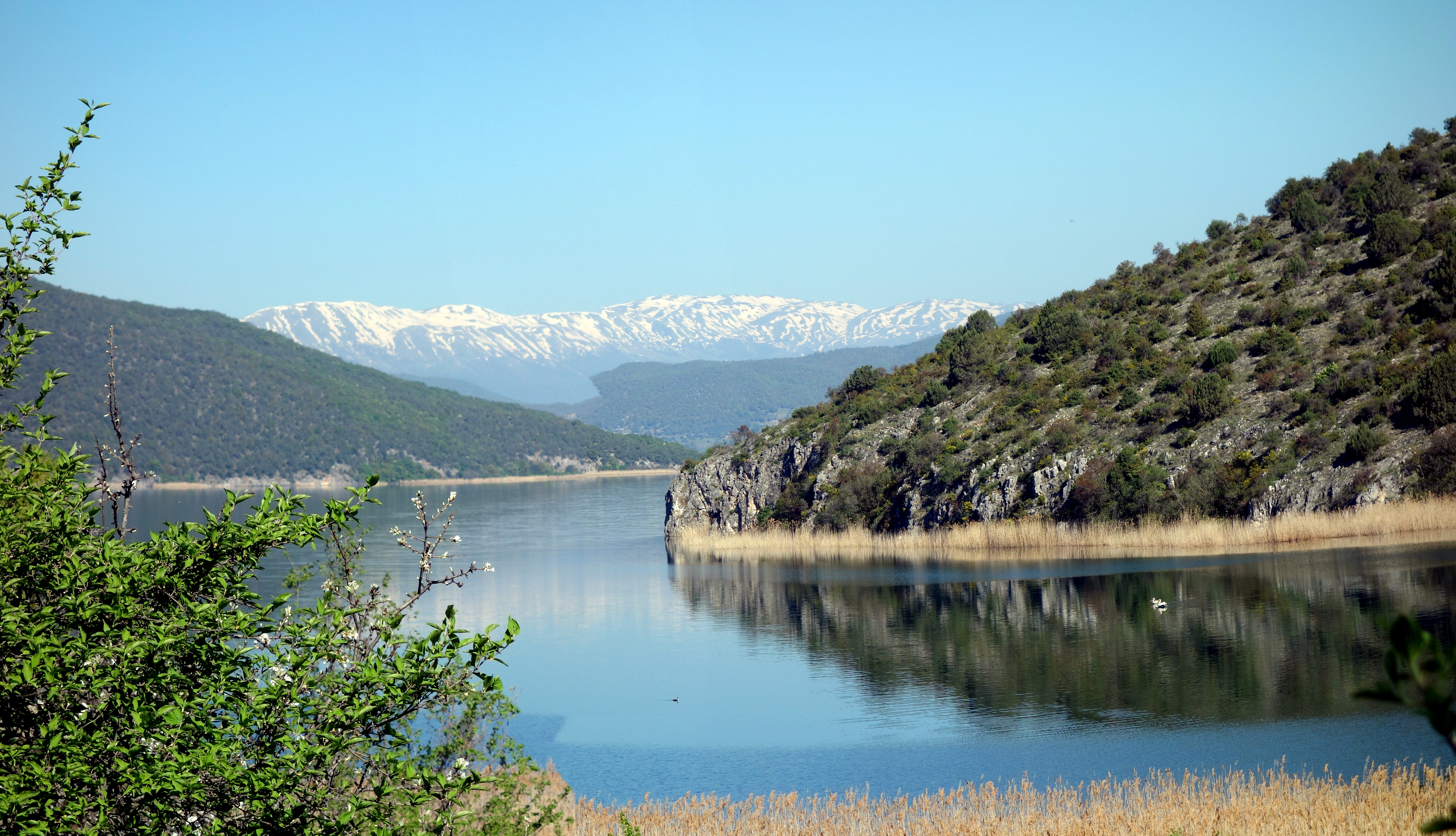
Mikri Prespa

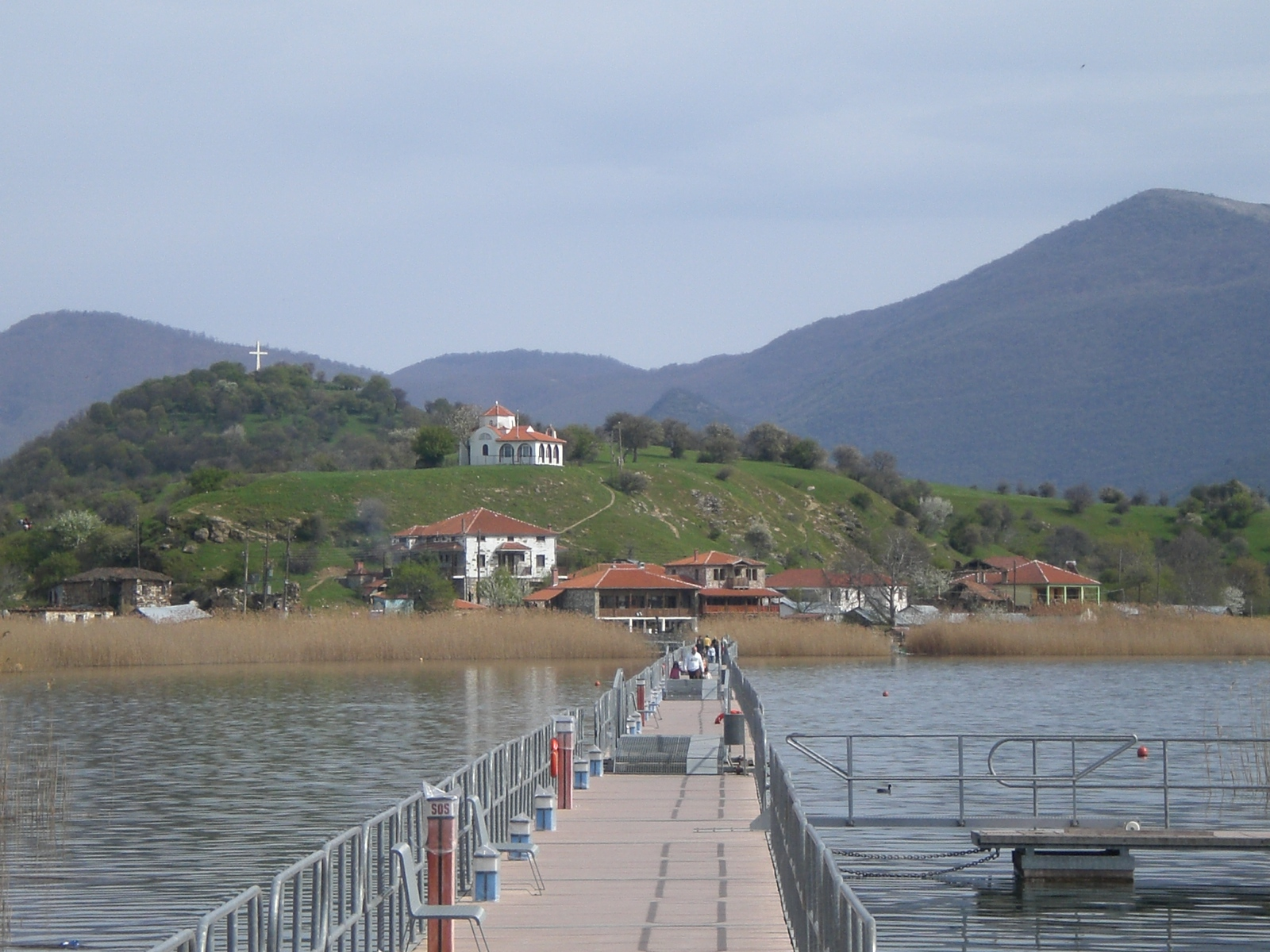
Walkway to Agios Achillios islet

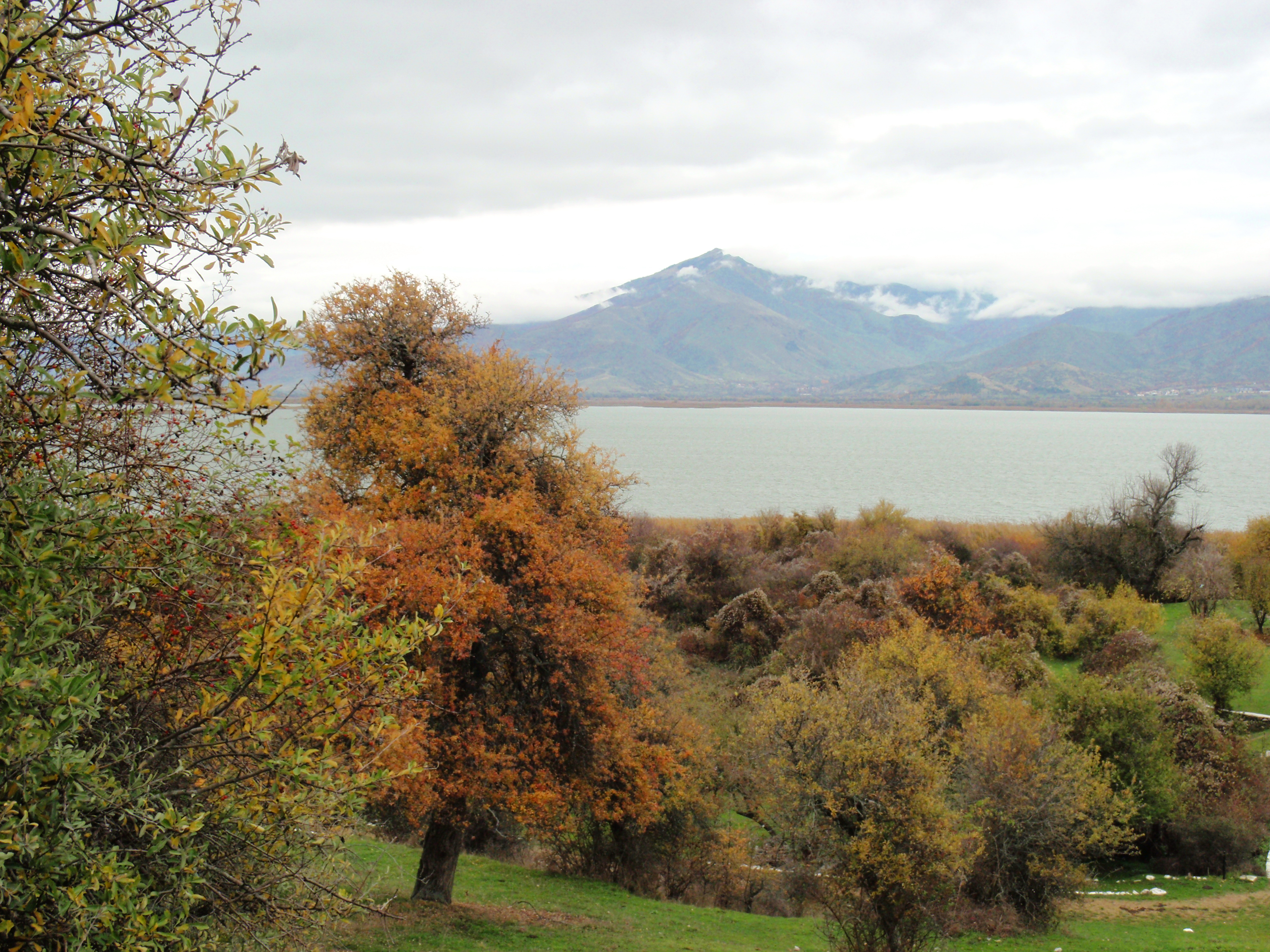
View from Agios Achillios

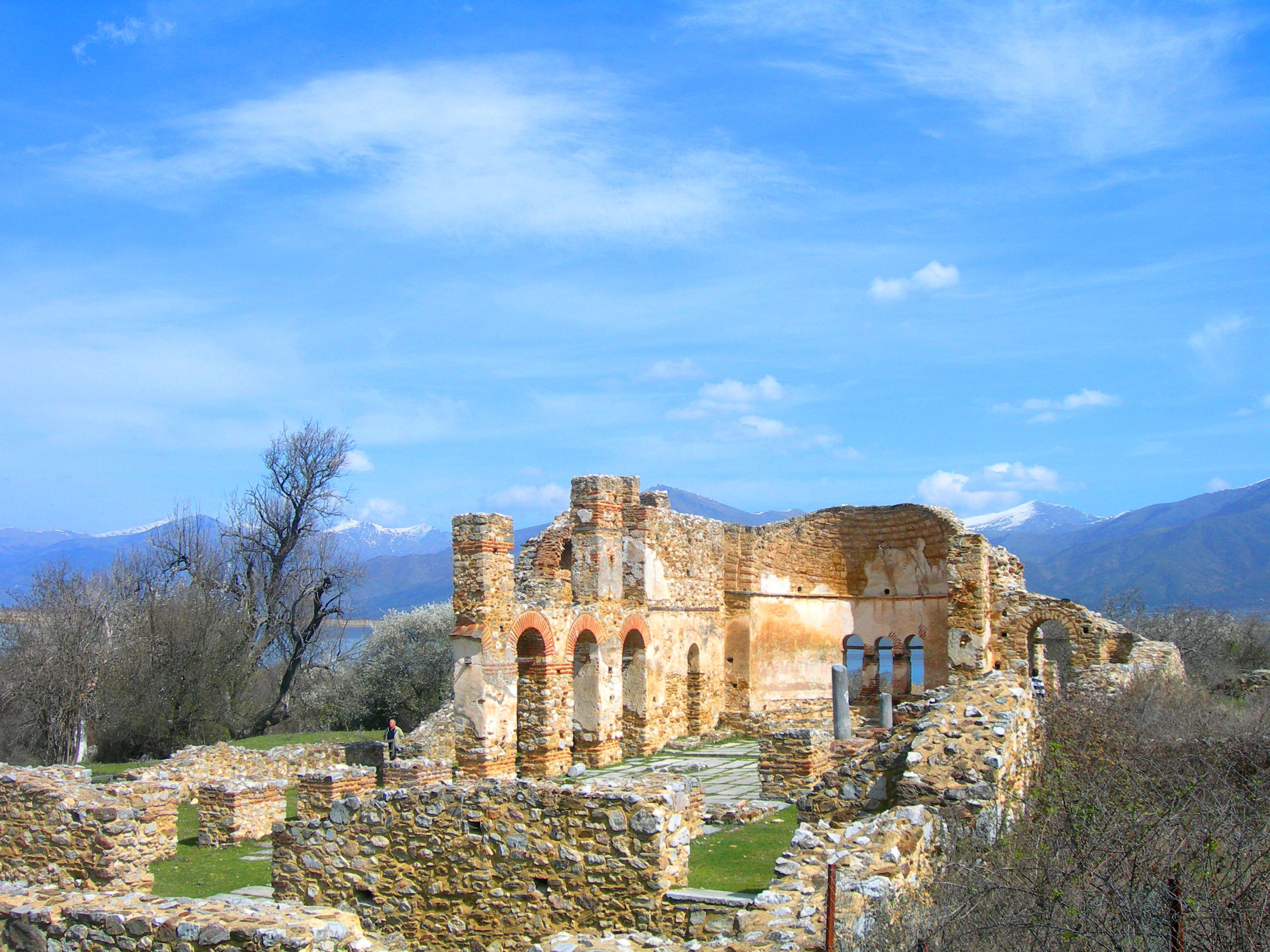
Ruins of St Achillios Basilica

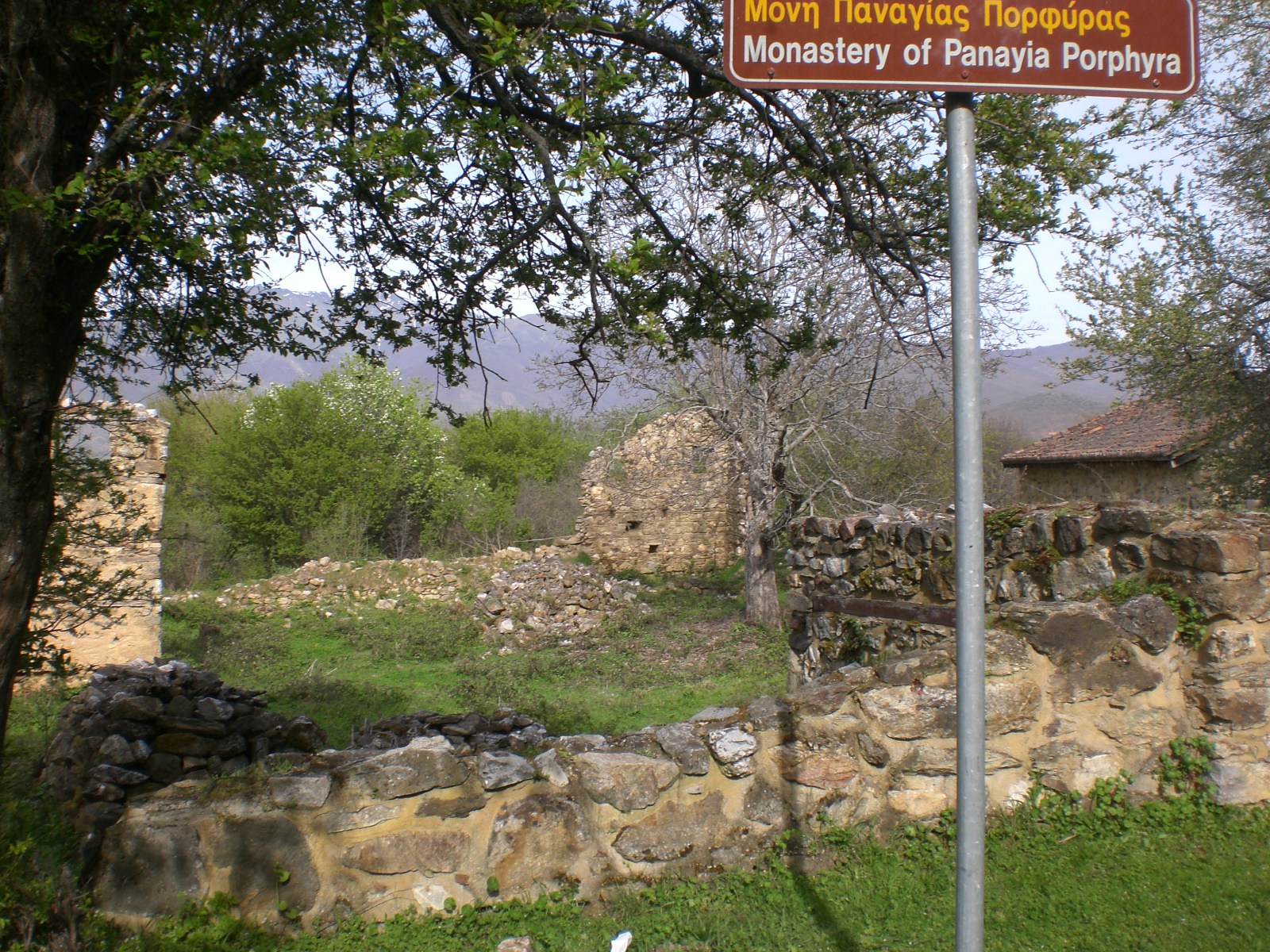
Exterior of Monastery of Panagia Porfyras, Agios Achillios

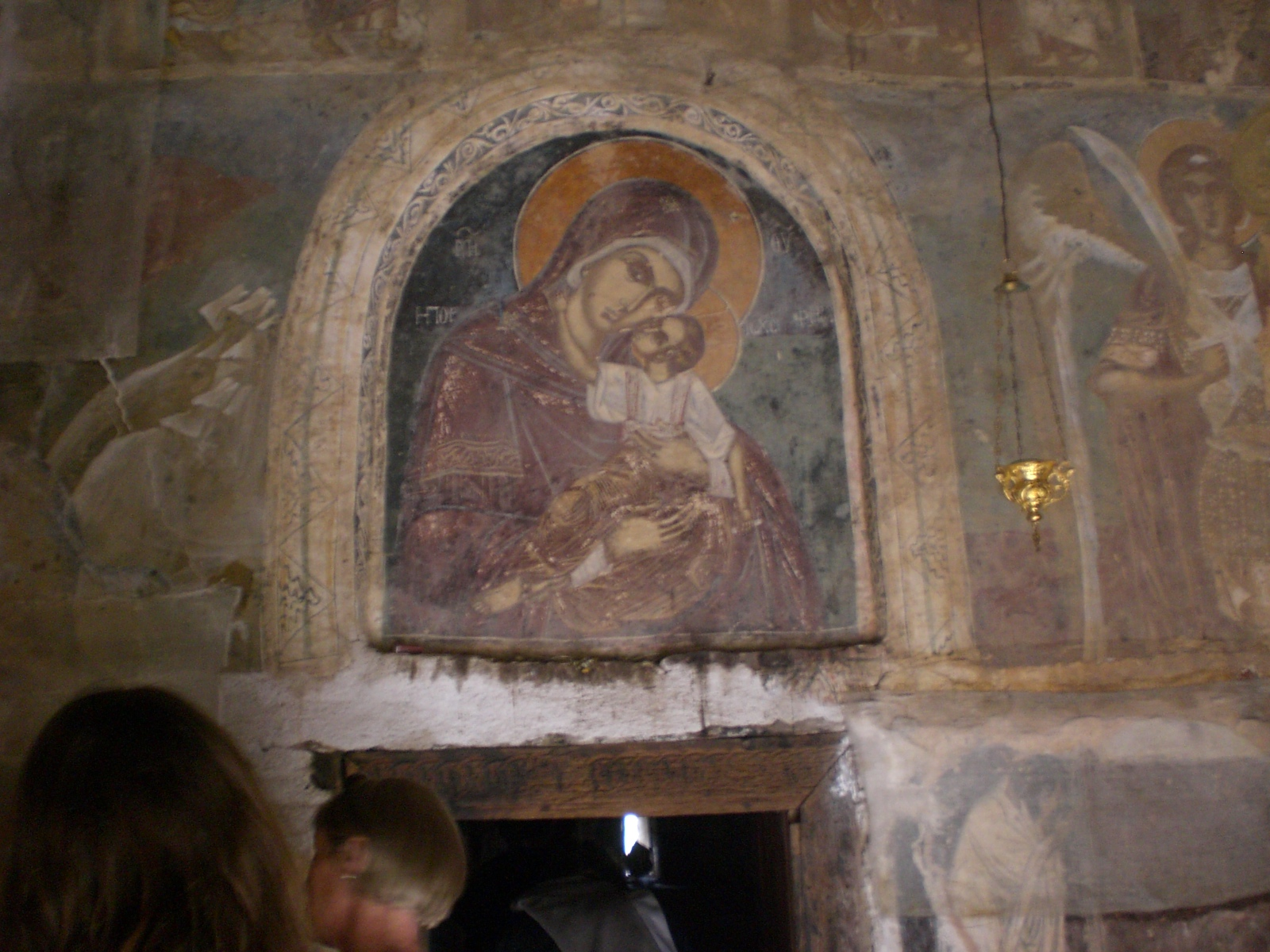
Interior of Monastery of Panagia Porfyras, Agios Achillios

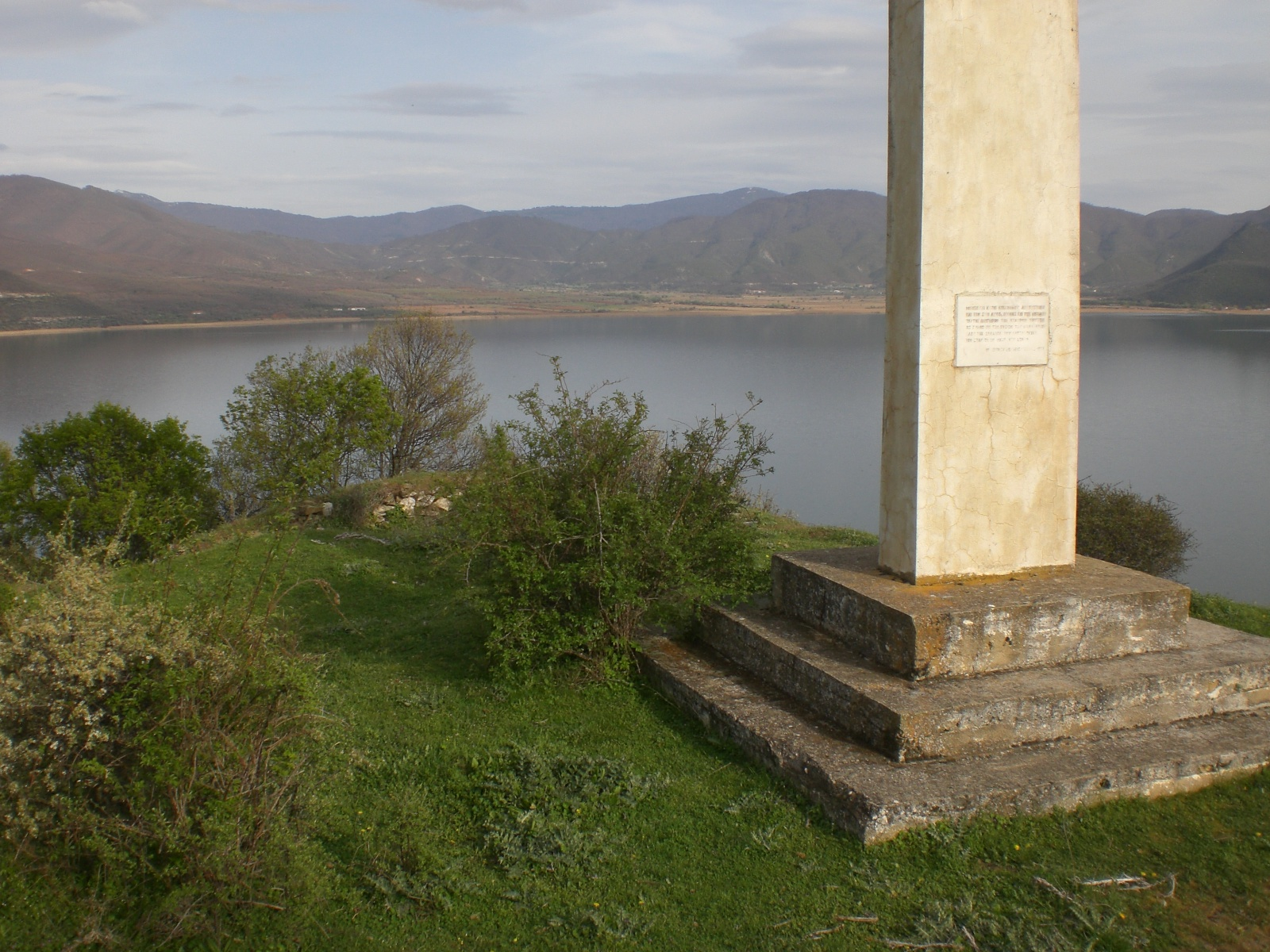
Marked summit of Agios Achillios

== See also ==
- Prespa National Park
- Prespa Lake

== Sources ==
- http://www.ekby.gr/ekby/en/alwet_web/alwet_site/en/alwet_aims_Prespa_en.html
