= Macedonians in Greece =

Macedonians in Greece may refer to:

- Macedonians (Greeks), a regional group inhabiting or originating from the region of Macedonia in Northern Greece
- Slavic speakers of Greek Macedonia, ethnic Macedonians in Greece
