= Karyes, Florina =

Karyes Καρυές
- Community
- Location within Greece
- Coordinates: 40°45′40″N 21°8′56″E
- Country: Greece
- Administrative region: West Macedonia
- Regional unit: Florina
- Municipality: Prespes
- Municipal unit: Prespes

Population (2021)
  - Community: 60
- Time zone: UTC+2 (EET)
  - Summer (DST): UTC+3 (EEST)

Karyes (Greek: Καρυές, before 1920: Όροβνικ – Orovnik) is a village in the Florina Regional Unit in West Macedonia, Greece.

== Demographics ==
In the early 1900s, 150 Slavonic speaking Christians lived in the village. During the Greek Civil War, the Greek refugee population living in nearby Pyli fled to Karyes. By the 1950s, the Greek government assisted a group of nomadic transhumant Aromanians, known as the Arvanitovlachs, to settle in depopulated villages of the Prespa region like Karyes. In the early 1970s, the population of Aromanians and Greeks in the village was more numerous than the Macedonian speaking people.

Karyes had 63 inhabitants in 1981. In fieldwork done by anthropologist Riki Van Boeschoten in late 1993, Karyes was populated by a Greek population descended from Anatolian Greek refugees who arrived during the Greek–Turkish population exchange.
