= Konjari =

Konjari Коњари Kojnare
- Village
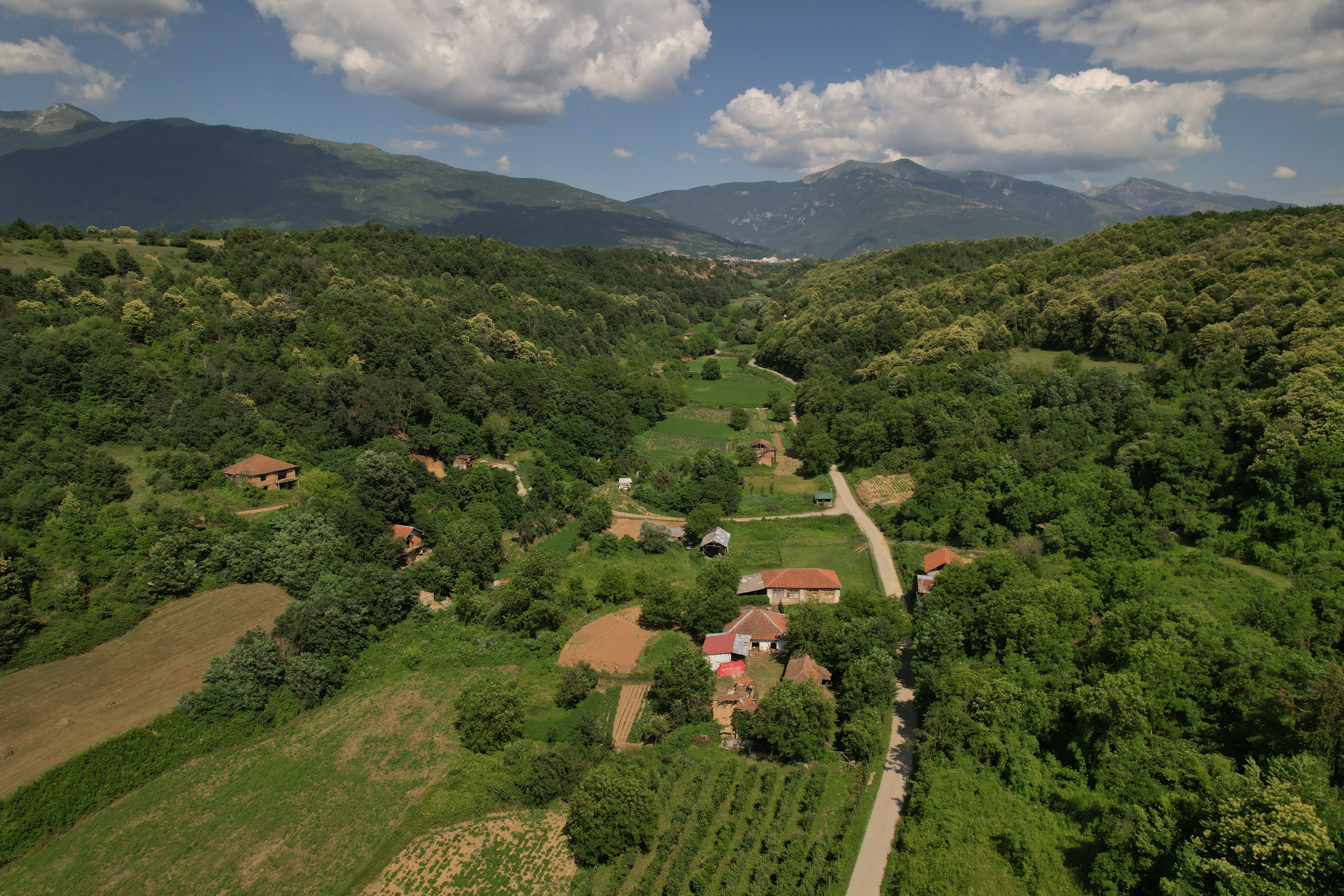
- Airview of the village

- Location within North Macedonia
- Coordinates: 41°31′23″N 20°28′51″E
- Country: North Macedonia
- Region: Southwestern
- Municipality: Debar Municipality

Population (2002)
  - Total: 0
- Time zone: UTC+1 (CET)
  - Summer (DST): UTC+2 (CEST)
- Car plates: DB
- Website: .

Konjari (Macedonian: Коњари, Albanian: Kojnare) is an uninhabited village in the municipality of Debar, North Macedonia.

== History ==
In 1224, an Albanian landowner by the name of Gjergj Skorra was explicitly mentioned in correspondence by the archbishop of Ohrid. He is believed to have owned lands in and around Konjar as a vassal of the noble Albanian Gropa family, and there is still a local tribe in the region known as 'Skorra'.

== Demographics ==
The 1971 Yugoslav census was the last to record any people as residing in the village which contained 415 inhabitants, of which 414 were Albanians and 1 Macedonian. According to the 2002 census, the village had 0 inhabitants.
