= Vrontero =

Vrontero Βροντερό
- Community
- Location within Greece
- Coordinates: 40°44′30″N 21°1′3″E
- Country: Greece
- Administrative region: Western Macedonia
- Regional unit: Florina
- Municipality: Prespes
- Municipal unit: Prespes

Population (2021)
  - Community: 46
- Time zone: UTC+2 (EET)
  - Summer (DST): UTC+3 (EEST)

Vrontero (Greek: Βροντερό, before 1926: Γκράσδενι – Gkrasdeni) is a village in the Florina Regional Unit in Western Macedonia, Greece.

== Demographics ==
In the early 1900s, 276 Slavonic speaking Christians lived in the village. Aromanians settled in the village in 1949. They were a group of nomadic transhumant Aromanians (known as the Arvanitovlachs) originating from Thessaly and the Greek government assisted their settlement into depopulated villages of the Prespa region like Vrontero. Aromanians are the only inhabitants of the village.

Vrontero had 172 inhabitants in 1981. In fieldwork done by anthropologist Riki Van Boeschoten in late 1993, Vrontero was populated by Aromanians. The Aromanian language was used by people of all ages, both in public and private settings, and as the main language for interpersonal relationships. Some elderly villagers had little knowledge of Greek.
