= Laimos =

Laimos Λαιμός
- Community
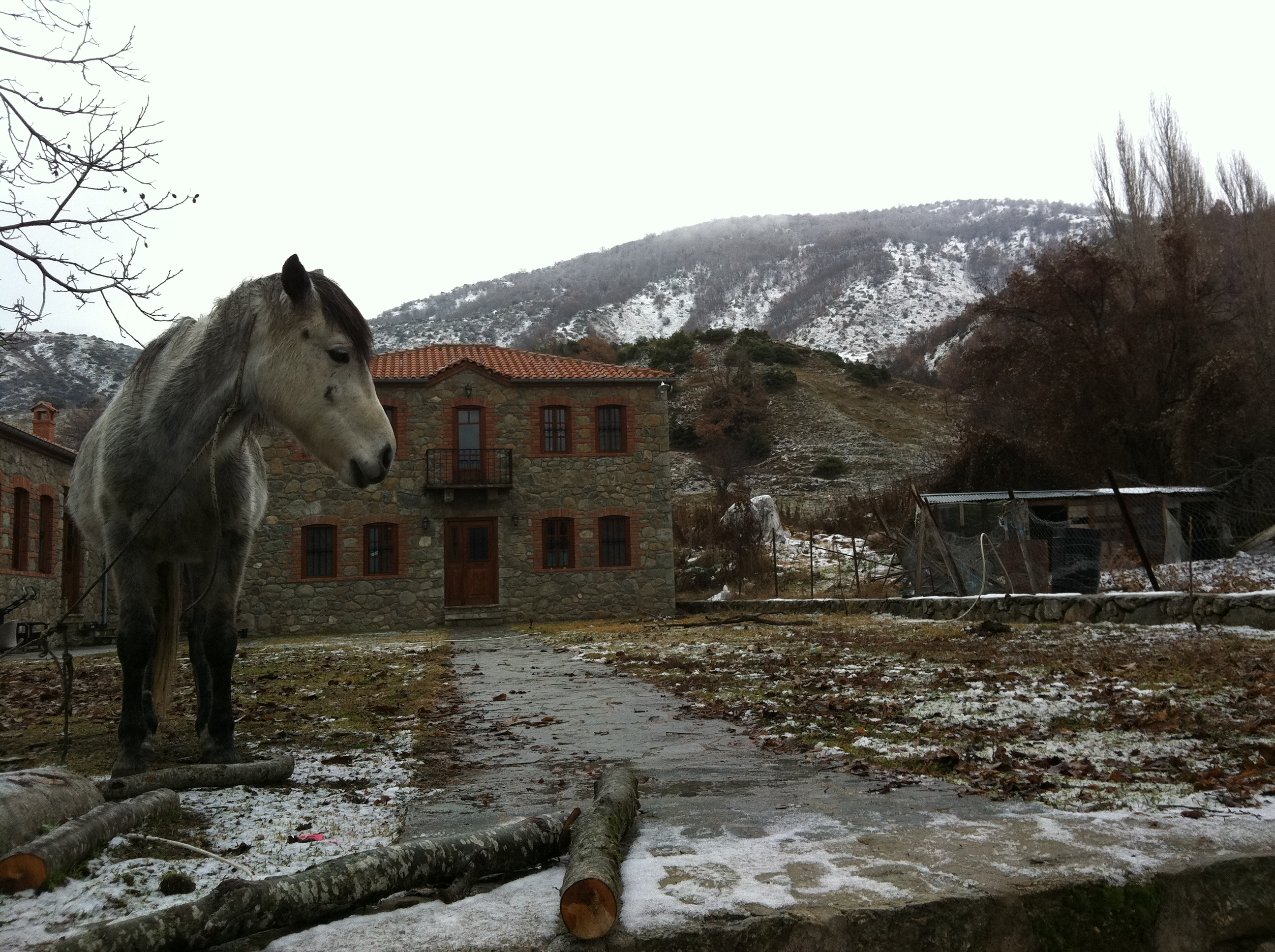
- Laimos

- Location within Greece
- Coordinates: 40°50′10″N 21°08′25″E
- Country: Greece
- Administrative region: West Macedonia
- Regional unit: Florina
- Municipality: Prespes
- Municipal unit: Prespes

Population (2021)
  - Community: 176
- Time zone: UTC+2 (EET)
  - Summer (DST): UTC+3 (EEST)

Laimos (Greek: Λαιμός, before 1926: Ράμπη – Rampi) is a village in the Florina Regional Unit in West Macedonia, Greece. It is the seat of the Prespes Municipality.

== Name ==
The village was originally known as Rampi (Greek: Ράμπη).

Among speakers of the Macedonian language in the village, they call the place Роби (Robi) and those in surrounding or more distant villages use the forms Раби (Rabi), Ръби (R'bi) and Ръмби (R'mbi). France Bezlaj derived toponyms with the Slavic element pronounced as rob from rub (edge) and depending on their location, as meaning either corner, edge or shore. Pianka Włodzimierz supports that derivation for the village name, as its located on the shore and the local pronunciation of the toponym's o sound. Folk etymology associates the toponym with the Slavic word rob for slave. In Albanian, the village is called Rëmb.

Its modern name Laimos (Greek: Λαιμός) means 'neck' in Greek and is likely a reference to its position by a narrow promontory separating Small Prespa Lake from Great Prespa Lake.

== History ==
The church of Ypapanti dates to the 15th century.

Rampi was heavily damaged during the Ilinden Uprising and the First Balkan War. Later named Laimos, the village was again damaged during the World War II German occupation. The village participated in the Greek Civil War, but overall emerged mostly unscathed following its conclusion. After the Greek Civil War, many inhabitants moved to Yugoslavia and other communist Eastern European countries.

In the early 1970s, the village had a church and mosque.

The village is crossed by the Paliorema river which empties into Great Prespa Lake. Until 1967, there was a border crossing with Yugoslavia (now North Macedonia) at the village of Dolno Dupeni. The border crossing was closed by the Greek military junta for political reasons. As a result of the Prespa Agreement between Greece and North Macedonia, the border crossing is scheduled to reopen in 2027. The main agricultural crop grown in the village are beans.

== Demographics ==
In 1865, Rampi had 50 Slavonic speaking Christian and 10 Muslim houses. In the early 1900s, 196 Slavonic speaking Christians and 100 Muslim Albanians lived in the village. The 1920 Greek census recorded 555 people in the village, and 123 inhabitants (20 families) were Muslim in 1923. The Albanian village population was present until 1926 when it was replaced with prosfiges (Greek refugees), due to the Greek–Turkish population exchange. In Rampi, 30 Greek refugee families were from Asia Minor and five others from an unidentified location in 1926. The 1928 Greek census recorded village 517 inhabitants. In 1928, the refugee families numbered 23 (99 people). The village had 150 houses, mostly belonging to Slavonic speaking Christian community and 10 houses to the Greek refugee population in 1948.

Laimos had 251 inhabitants in 1981. In fieldwork done by anthropologist Riki Van Boeschoten in late 1993, Laimos was populated by Slavophones and a Greek population descended from Anatolian Greek refugees who arrived during the Greek-Turkish population exchange. The Macedonian language was spoken in the village by people over 30 in public and private settings. Children understood the language, but mostly did not use it.
