= Dolno Dupeni =

Dolno Dupeni Долно Дупени
- Village
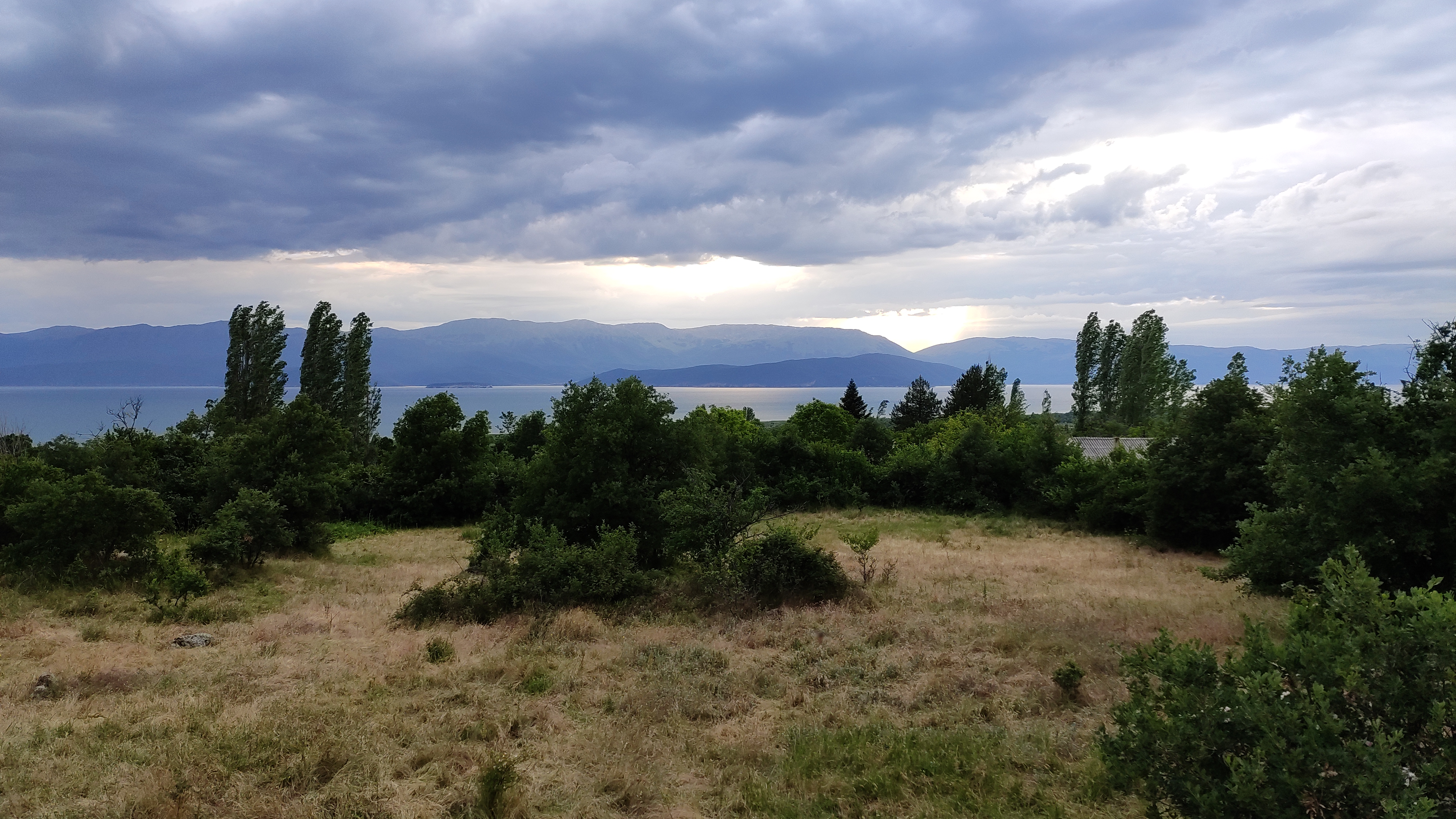
- View from above the village Dolno Dupeni

- Location within North Macedonia
- Coordinates: 40°52′32″N 21°7′10″E
- Country: North Macedonia
- Region: Pelagonia
- Municipality: Resen
- Elevation: 900 m (3,000 ft)
- Highest elevation: 970 m (3,180 ft)
- Lowest elevation: 870 m (2,850 ft)

Population (2002)
  - Total: 235
- Time zone: UTC+1 (CET)
  - Summer (DST): UTC+2 (CEST)
- Area code: +389
- Car plates: RE

Dolno Dupeni (Macedonian: Долно Дупени) is a village in the Resen Municipality of North Macedonia. Located on Lake Prespa, its beach runs to the border with Greece. This is the Southernmost extreme point of North Macedonia.

== Demographics ==
Dolno Dupeni has 235 inhabitants as of the census of 2002. Macedonians have historically made up at least 96% of the village population. A large number of refugees settled from Greek Macedonia after being forcefully evacuated from the villages of Northern Greece.

== Climate ==
Dolno Dupeni has nice, pleasant weather because of its elevation and geographic position. This village has a mixture of Mediterranean and Continental Alpine climates. Heavy snowfalls happened in the past but it is rare now. Below-freezing temperatures are common during the winter months, while summers are warm with cool nights. This climate is considered to be Cfb according to the Köppen-Geiger climate classification. The average annual temperature is 8.7 °C (47.7 °F). In a year, the rainfall is 702 millimetres (27.6 in).

== Media ==
A local TV series called Pogresno Vreme was recorded in the village. It was recorded in 2000 and had 37 episodes. All of them can be viewed on youtube.

== People from Dolno Dupeni ==
- Dragi Mitrevski (1959 - ), archaeologist
- Vlado Popovski (1941 - ), politician and professor

== Gallery ==
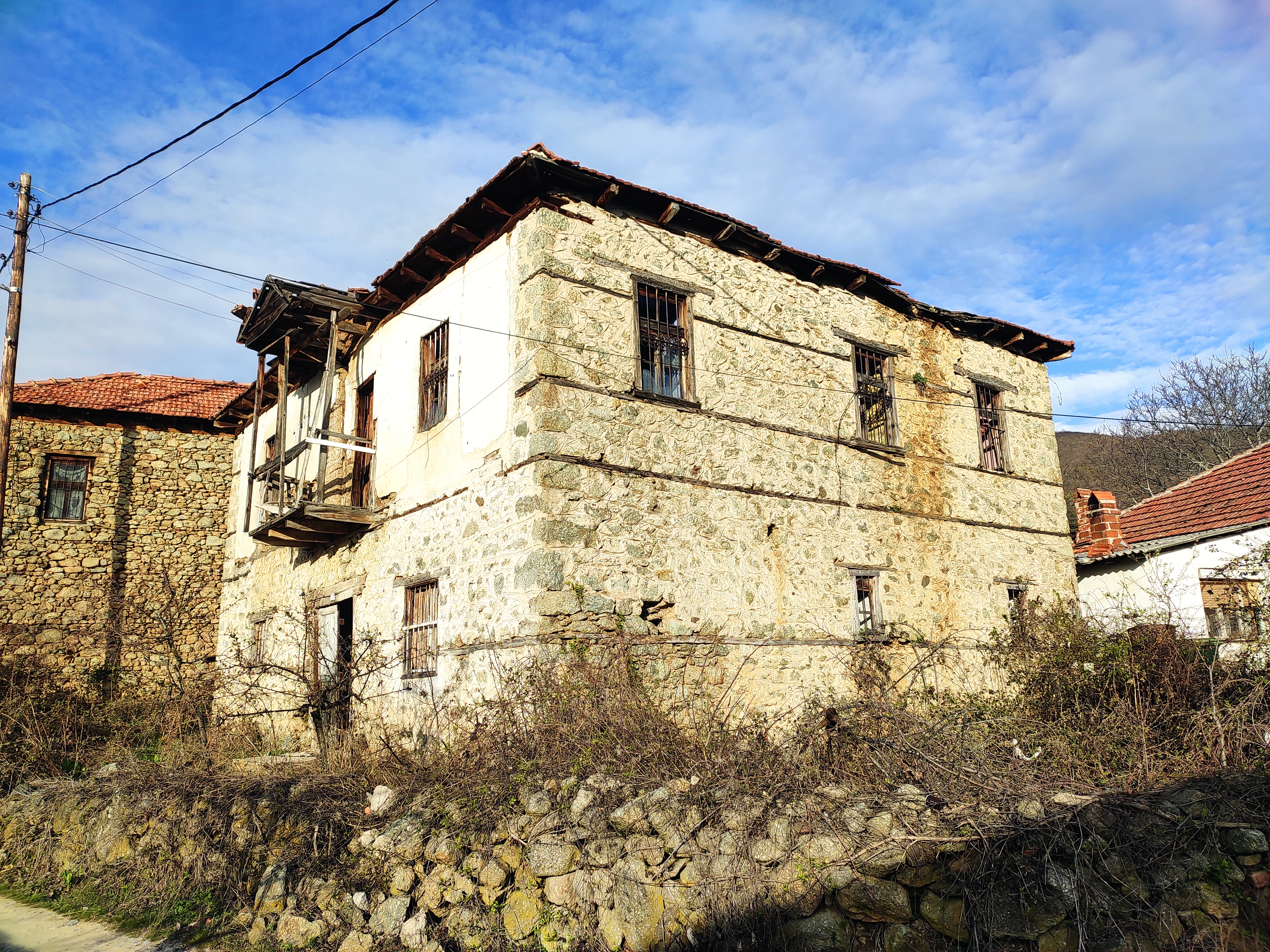

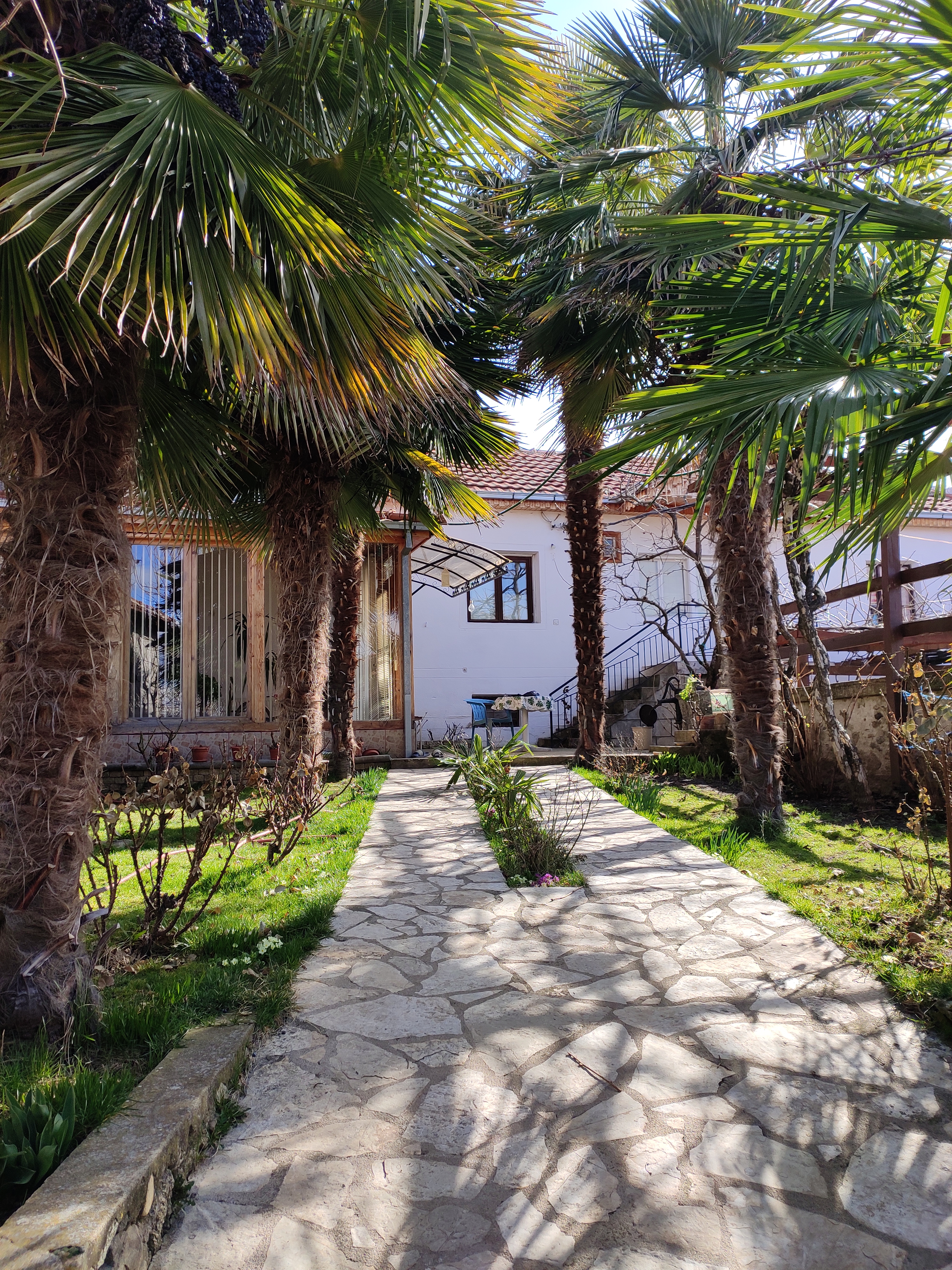

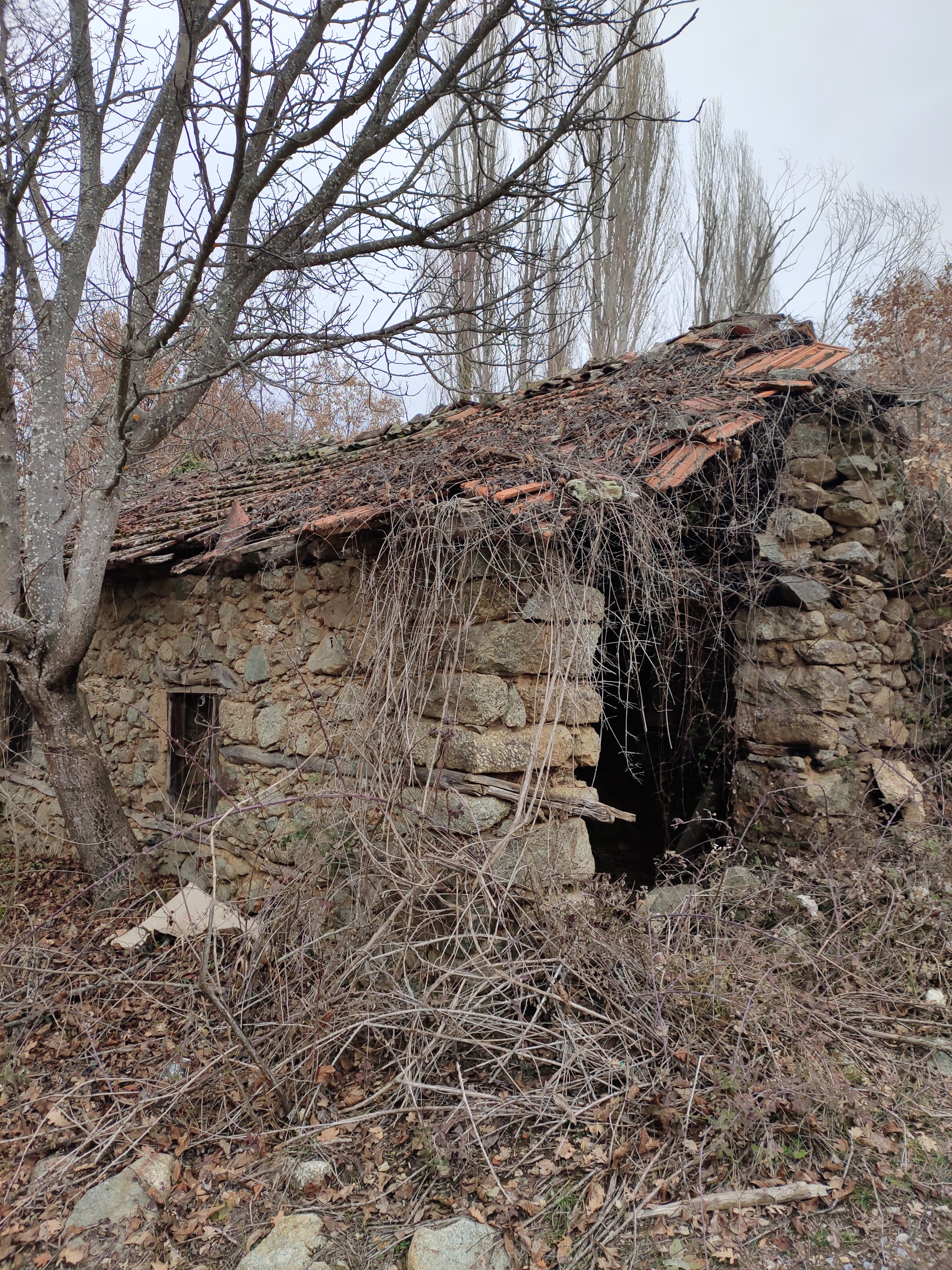

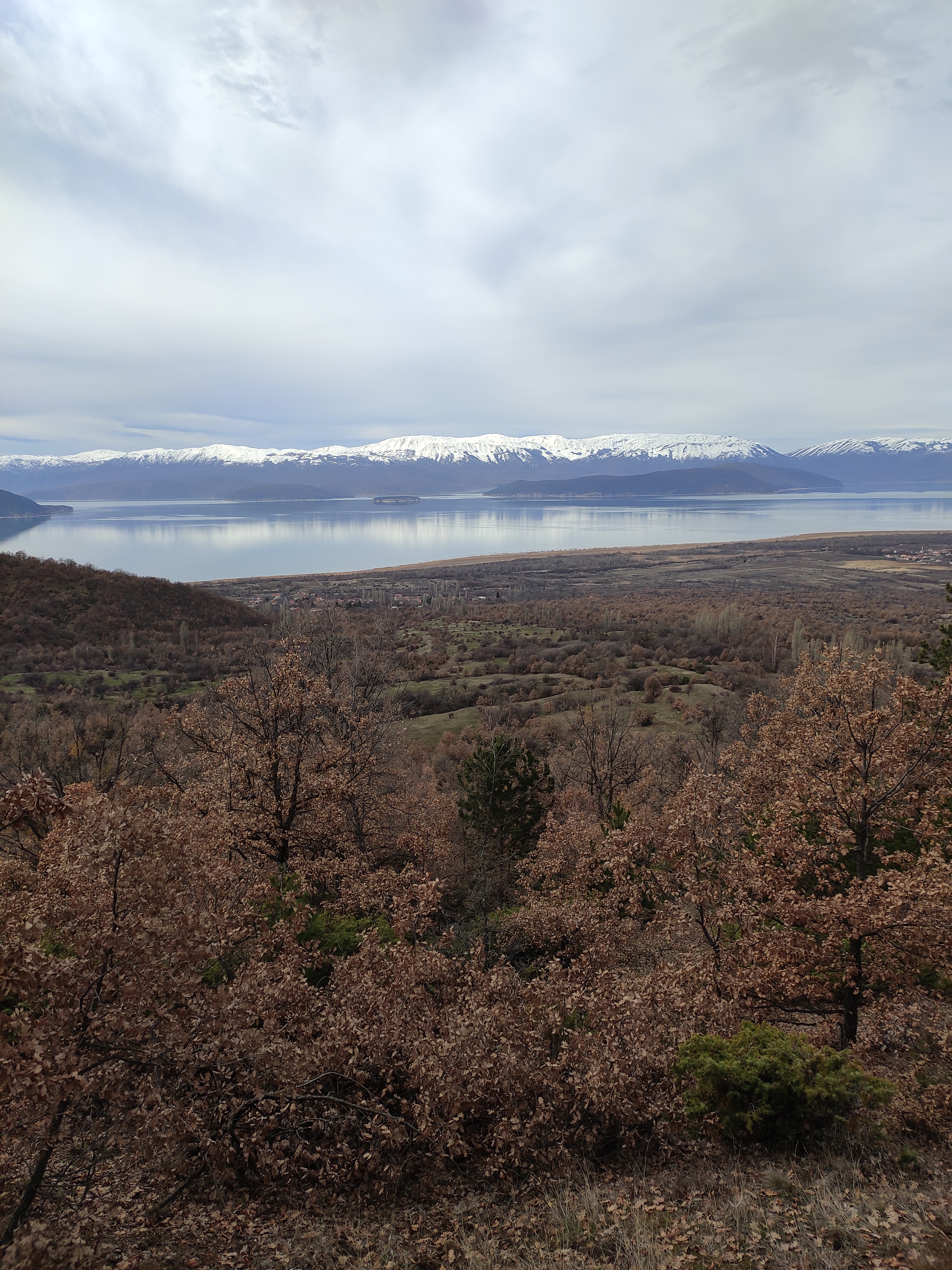

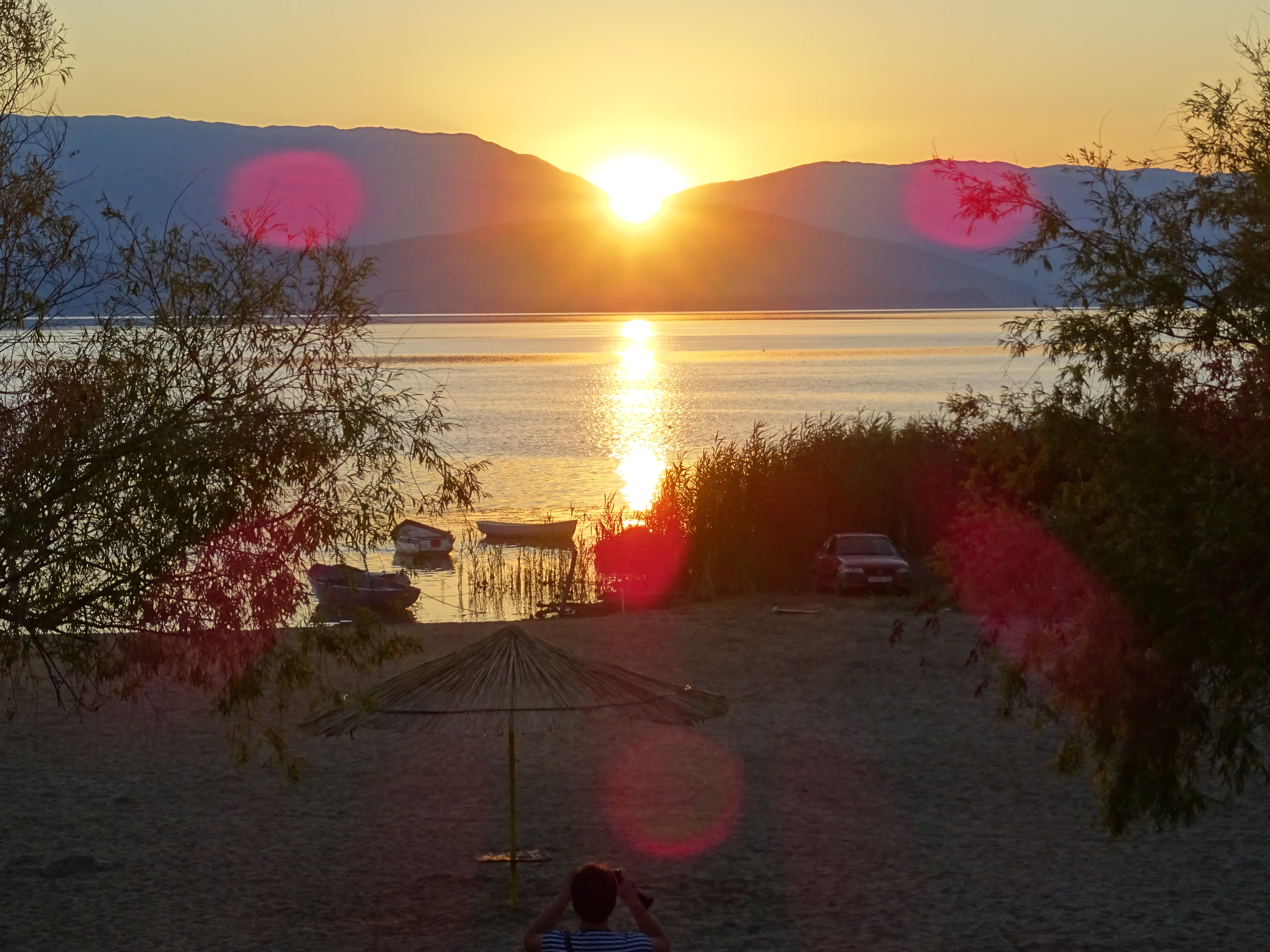
