= Prespes =

Municipality in Macedonia, Greece

Prespes Δήμος Πρεσπών
- Municipality
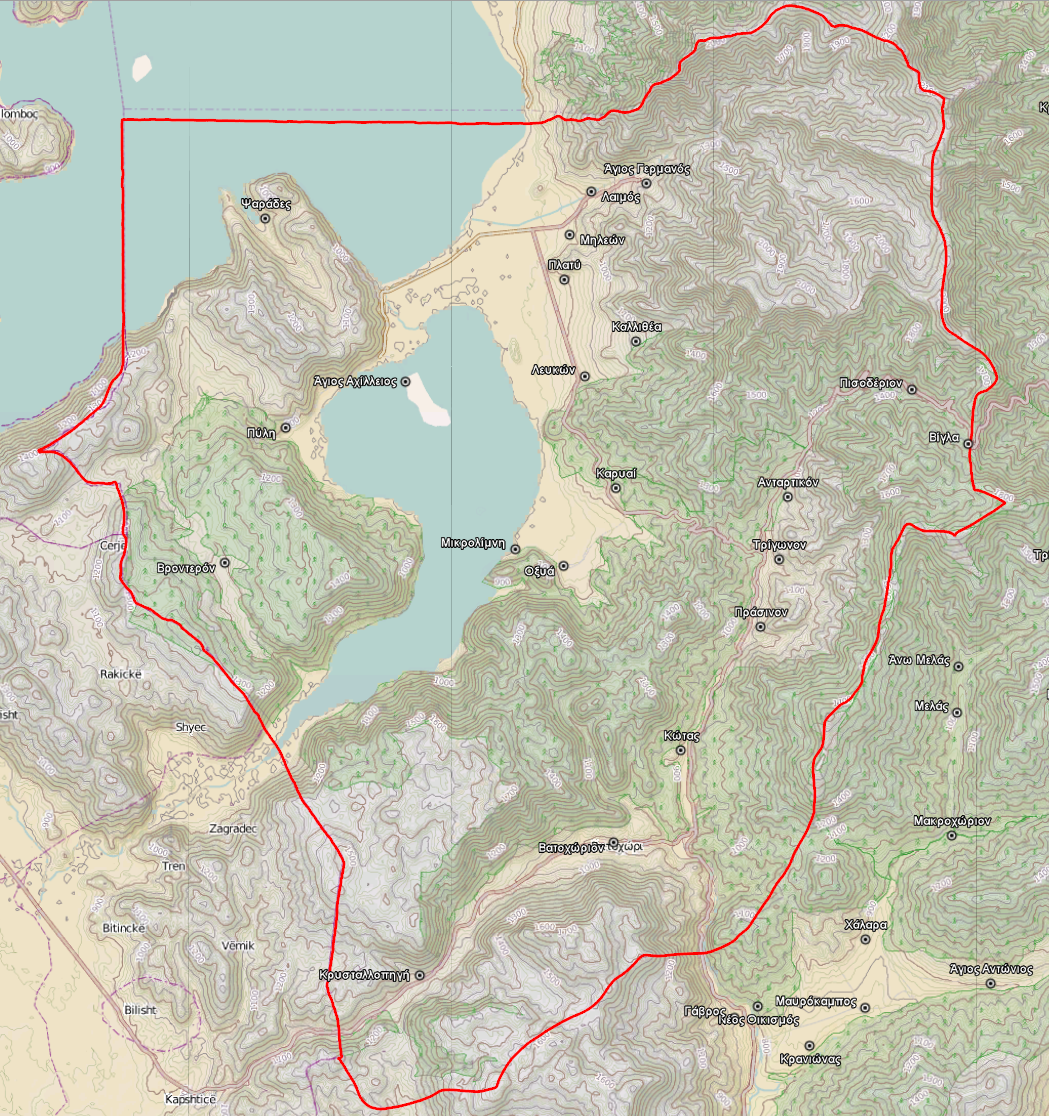
- Prespes municipality map

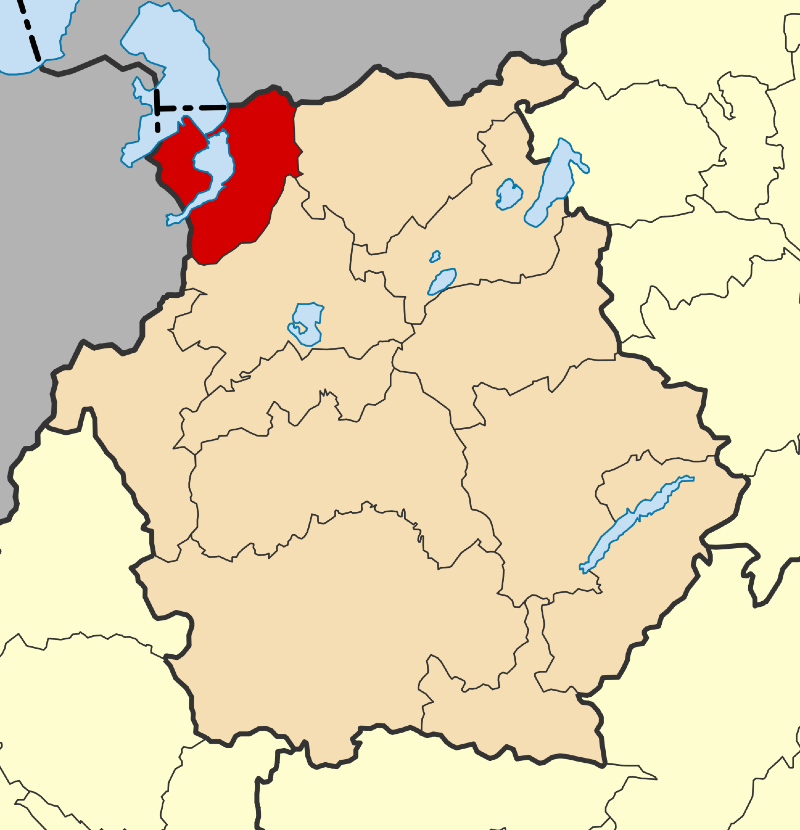

- Location within Greece
- Coordinates: 40°45′N 21°8′E
- Country: Greece
- Administrative region: Western Macedonia
- Regional unit: Florina
- Seat: Laimos

Area
  - Municipality: 515.5 km^{2} (199.0 sq mi)
  - Municipal unit: 413.5 km^{2} (159.7 sq mi)

Population (2021)
  - Municipality: 1,211
  - Density: 2.349/km^{2} (6.084/sq mi)
  - Municipal unit: 1,066
  - Municipal unit density: 2.578/km^{2} (6.677/sq mi)
- Time zone: UTC+2 (EET)
  - Summer (DST): UTC+3 (EEST)
- Postal code: 530 77
- Website: https://www.prespes.gr/

Prespes (Greek: Πρέσπες) is a municipality in the Florina regional unit, Western Macedonia, Greece. Its population in 2021 was 1,211. The seat of the municipality is in Laimos. It was named after Lake Prespa, in the western part of the municipality.

== Municipality ==
The municipality was formed at the 2011 local government reform by the merger of the former municipalities of Krystallopigi and Prespes, that became municipal units.

The municipality has an area of 515.497 km^{2}, the municipal unit 413.513 km^{2}. According to the 2011 Greek census, Prespes was the least densely populated municipality in the country, with an average of 3.05 residents per square kilometre, and also the smallest municipality, by population size, of the Florina regional unit.

== Election Results ==
=== Parliamentary ===
2000

2004

2007

2009

5/2012

6/2012

1/2015

9/2015

2019

5/2023

6/2023

=== European ===
2009

2014

2019

2024
