= List of Macedonians (Greek) =

The following is a list of Macedonians.

== Ancient ==
See List of ancient Macedonians.

== Roman ==
Also see Macedonia (Roman province)#Citizens

- Sopater, (Veria 1st century BC), saint, accompanied by Paulos
- Antipater of Thessalonica (late 1st century BC), epigrammatic poet and governor of the city
- Philippus of Thessalonica (late 1st century AD), epigrammatic poet and compiler of the Greek Anthology
- Saint Hermes, (Thessaloniki, Rome 120 AD)
- Martyr Theodora (Thessaloniki, Rome 123 AD)
- Athryilatus of Thasos (1–2nd century AD), physician
- Agape, Chionia, and Irene (died 304), saints
- Saint Demetrius, early 4th century

== Byzantine ==
=== Rulers ===
- Basil I the Macedonian (811–886, ruled 867–886), founder of the Macedonian dynasty, born in Macedonia (theme)
- Nikephoros Bryennios (1062–1137), general, statesman, historian
- Michael and Andreas Palaiologos (1342–1350), leaders of the Zealots' regime of Thessalonica
- Andronikos Palaiologos, despot of Thessalonike (1408–1423)

=== Clerics ===
- Paul I of Constantinople Ecumenical Patriarch (337–339)
- Demophilus of Constantinople Ecumenical Patriarch (370–380)
- Saint Methodius (826–885), main translator of the Bible into Old Church Slavonic
- Saint Cyril (827–869), creator of the Glagolitic alphabet, Christianized the Slavs
- Philotheus Kokkinos (1300–1379), ecumenical patriarch
- Matthew Blastares (c. 1290–1360), monk, canonist
- Nilus Cabasilas (1298–1363), theologian
- Nicholas Cabasilas (c. 1319–1391), mystic theologian
- Macarius Macres (1382–1431), theologian
- Isidore of Kiev, Thessaloniki, Metropolitan of Kiev (1433–1458), ecumenical patriarch (1450–53)

=== Scholars, religious authors ===
- Stobaeus (5th century), anthologist of Greek authors
- Macedonius of Thessalonica (the Consul) (6th century), epigrammatist of Greek Anthology
- John Kaminiates (904), historian on the sack of Thessalonica by the Saracens
- Theodora of Arta, (Servia 1210, Arta 1280)
- John Staurakios, hagiographer (fl. late 13th century)
- Demetrius Triclinius (c. 1300), philologist, astronomer
- Thomas Magister (c. 1275–1325), philologist
- Gregory Acindynus (1300–1348), theologian
- Demetrius Cydones (1324–1397), scholastic theologian
- Prochorus Cydones (1330–1369), scholastic theologian
- Nikephoros Choumnos (c. 1250–1327), official, scholar and physicist
- Konstantinos Armenopoulos (1320–c. 1385), jurist
- John Anagnostes (1430), historian on the capture of Thessalonica by the Ottomans
- Theodorus Gaza (c. 1400–1475), Renaissance humanist and translator of Aristotle
- Mazaris, (15th century), writer from Thessaloniki
- Georgios Kontaris (17th century), philosopher and historian from Servia

=== Artists ===
- Manuel Panselinos, painter, iconographer of Macedonian Renaissance
- George Kallierges, painter
- Michael Astrapas and Eutychios, iconographers

== Early Modern ==
=== Scholars ===
- Andronikos Kallistos (1400–1486), teacher of Greek literature in Bologna, Rome, Florence, Paris and London
- Ioannis Kottounios (1572–1657), founder the Kottounian Hellinomouseio
- Konstantinos Kallokratos (born 1589), teacher and poet
- Kallinikos Manios (1624–1665), founder of the first school in Veroia
- Georgios Parakeimenos, director of Kozani's school, physician and preacher
- Sevastos Leontiadis (1690–1765), director of Kastoria's school
- Michail Papageorgiou (1727–1796), taught in his birthplace, Selitsa (today Eratyra), Meleniko, Vienna and Budapest
- Dimitrios Karakasis (1734–?), physician in Vienna, Larisa, Siatista, Kozani, Bucharest
- Manassis Iliadis (early 18th century – 1785), born in Meleniko; taught philosophy and physics at the Bucharest Academy
- Konstantinos Michail, philosopher, physician and linguist
- Dimitrios Darvaris (1754–1823), born in Kleisoura, Kastoria, publisher of a Greek grammar
- Charissios Megdanis (1768–1823), born in Kozani, priest, doctor, writer
- Georgios Sakellarios (1765–1838), chief physician at the court of Ali Pasha
- Michail Perdikaris (1766–1828), born in Kozani, physician and scholar
- Athanasios Christopoulos (1772–1847), poet, scholar and "spokesman for foreign cases" in Wallachia
- Efronios Raphael Papagiannoussi Popovits (1774–1853), born in Kozani, Scholar and Benefactor (among others: the Charta of Rigas)
- Grigorios Zalykis (1777–1820), Thessaloniki, writer, founder of "Ellenoglosson Xenodochion"
- Georgios Rousiadis (1783–1854), born in Kozani, teacher in the Greek community of Vienna and Pest; took part in the Greek War of Independence
- Minas Minoidis, born in Edessa, taught Ancient Greek language and literature in Paris
- Athanasios Stageiritis from Stagira, professor of Greek language at the Royal Academy in Vienna, publisher of the fortnightly literary journal "Kalliope" in Vienna from 1819 to 1821
- Theodoros Manousis (1793–1858), historian, judge, benefactor and archaeologist from Siatista
- Anastasios Michail, member of Berlin's Academy of Sciences
- Georgios Lassanis (1793–1870), scholar and politician
- Nicholaos Dragoumis (1809–1879), politician and writer from Kastoria regional unit
- Ioannis Pantazidis from Krusevo (1821–1900), professor in University of Athens in Greek literature
- Margaritis Dimitsas (1829–1903), writer from Achrida
- Sophocles Garbolas (1833–1911), writer, journalist; he published in 1875 the first Greek newspapers in Thessalonica, Ermis (Hermes) and Pharos tis Makedonias (Lighthouse of Macedonia)
- Theodoros Natsinas (1872–1949), scholar and director of school (Maraslion of Thessaloniki)

=== Benefactors ===
- Georg Johannes Karajanis (fl. c. 1750), born in Kozani, merchant, great-great-grandfather of Herbert von Karajan
- Stergios Doumpas (1794–1870), born in Vlasti, merchant, patron of arts
- Nikolaos Doumpas (1830–1900), from Vlasti, patron of arts, politician, founder of the first interteaching Greek school in Vienna
- Demetrius Vikelas (1835–1908), the first president of the International Olympic Committee (IOC)
- Calliope Tatti (1894–1978), philanthropist
- Ioannis Papafis, (1792–1886), Thessaloniki, funded the Greek War of Independence
- Ioannis Trampatzis, (1813–1890), Siatista, merchant

=== Explorers ===
- Evstratios Delarov, (1740–1806), one of the first explorers of Alaska

=== Clerics ===
- Patriarch Isidore I of Constantinople Ecumenical Patriarch of Constantinople (1347–1349)
- Patriarch Philotheus I of Constantinople Ecumenical Patriarch of Constantinople (1354–1376)
- Patriarch Nephon I of Constantinople Ecumenical Patriarch of Constantinople (1311–1315)
- Damaskinos (Stouditis) (died 1577), patriarchal exarch of Aetolia
- Mitrofanis Kritopoulos (1589–1639), Patriarch of Alexandria
- Chrysanthos (1768–1834), born in Edessa, metropolitan bishop of Serres, Ecumenical Patriarch of Constantinople
- Patriarch Joachim III of Constantinople (1834–1912)
- Patriarch Callinicus of Alexandria, Konstantinos Kyparissis, (Skotina, Pieria 1800 – Mytilini 1889)
- Patriarch Neophytus VIII of Constantinople Ecumenical Patriarch (1891–1894)

=== Revolutionaries ===
==== Greek War of Independence (1821 and before) ====
- Dionysius the Philosopher Ekonomikos, (1540–1611), with origin from Avdella, Grevena regional unit, Bishop, revolutionary in 1611
- Zisis Karadimos (died 1705)
- Panagiotis Zidros (1630–1750), from Grevena
- Georgios Papazolis (1725–1775), born in Siatista, leader of Orlov Revolt in 1770, officer of Russian army
- Apostolos "Tolios" Lazos (Milia, Pieria, born 1770), son of Gero-Lazos
- Nikolaos Tsaras (Nikotsaras), (Olympos 1774 – Litochoro 1807)
- Theoharis Tourountzias (1776–1798), born in Siatista, co-martyr of Rigas Feraios
- Ioannis Emmanouel (1774–1798), born in Kastoria, co-martyr of Rigas Feraios
- Ioannis Pharmakis (1772–1821) Greek War of Independence
- Ioannis Ziakas, Grevena (1795–1826), son of Gero-Ziakas
- Anastassios Chimeftos, (Kassandra – died 1821)
- Apostolos Kotas, (Chalkidiki – Psara 1824), Greek War of Independence
- Anastassios Voulgaris (died 1839), Greek revolutionary from Malessi, Greek War of Independence
- Vassilios Romfeis (1773 – after 1804), Naousa, Imathia, Greek War of Independence
- Stamatios Kapsas (Capetan Chapsas), (Kryopigi Kassandras – Vasilika 1821)
- Zafeirakis Theodosiou, (died 1822)
- Diamantis Nikolaou, Fteri, Pieria (1790–1856), Greek War of Independence
- Vassilios Athanassiou, (Riza, Chalkidiki – died 1828)
- Anastasios Karatasos (1764–1830)
- Aggelis Gatsos (1771–1839)
- Georgios Asteriou, (Varvara, Chalkidiki – Atalanti 1847)
- Emmanouel Pappas (1772–1821)
- Nikolaos Tsamis, Edessa, Greek War of Independence, creator of the first official Greek flag
- Mavroudis Papageorgakis (Polygyros – Atalanti 1847)
- Markos Dragoumis (1770–1854), born in Vogatsiko, Kastoria regional unit
- Konstantinos Doumpiotis, (Doumpia, Chalkidiki 1793 – Chalkida 1865)
- Nikolaos Kasomoulis (1795–1872), born in Siatista, member of Filiki Eteria
- Andronikos Paikos (Thessaloniki 1796 – Athina 1879)

==== Northern Greece revolts (1854 and 1878) ====
- Dimitrios Karatasos (1798–1861)
- Leonidas Voulgaris, (1822–after 1878), from Malessi, Revolution of 1854 and 1878
- Theodoros Ziakas, Grevena (1798–1882), brother of Ioannis Ziakas, Revolution of 1854 and 1878
- Kosmas Doumpiotis, from Nikiti, Chalkidiki, (1826–1922), Revolution of 1878
- Argyrios Vouzas (1857–?), born in Kastoria

==== Macedonian Struggle (1903 to 1908) ====
- Iraklis Patikas, born in Vasilika, Thessaloniki
- Georgios Pentzikis, born in Thessaloniki
- Georgios Savvas, born in Thessaloniki
- Lazaros Tsamis (1878–1933), born in Pisoderi
- Ioannis Simanikas, born in Naousa, Imathia
- Michael Sionidis (1870–1935), born in Grčište, close to Bogdanci
- Dimitrios Stagas, born in Kleisoura, Kastoria
- Athanasios Stavroudis (1873–), born in Melissochori, Thessaloniki
- Georgios Thomopoulos (1866–1952), born in Ritini
- Dimitrios Tsitsimis, born in Strumica
- Ioannis Ramnalis (1885–1923), born in Isoma, near Kilkis
- Stergios Vlachveis (1880–1948), born in Irakleia, Serres
- Zisis Vrakas (1857–), born in Perivoli, Grevena
- Christos Dogiamas (1880–), born in Kastaneri, Paionia
- Doukas Gaitatzis (1879–1938), born in Serres
- Georgios Seridis, born in Flampouro, Florina
- Pavlos Rakovitis (1877–1907), born in Kratero
- Pavlos Kyrou (–1906), born in Antartiko
- Georgios Doitsinis, born in Evzonoi
- Traianos Liantzakis, born in Antartiko
- Christos Stogiannidis (1884–), born in Arnissa
- Georgios Karaiskakis (–1910), born in Bogdanci
- Periklis Drakos, born in Kavala
- Dimitrios Golnas (–1908), born in Nymfaio
- Charalambos Boufidis and Pantelis Papaioannou (–1907), born in Kolešino
- Antigonos Choleris (–1913), born in Vevi
- Petros Christou (1887–1908), born in Velušina
- Stergios Daoutis (–1973), born in Ano Seli, Imathia
- Konstantinos Papastavrou, born in Mavrochori
- Evangelos Natsis (1876–1904), born in Asprogeia, Florina
- Stergios Goutas (–1913), born in Mesolouri
- Georgios Giotas (1880–1911), born in Giannitsa
- Dimitrios Tsapanos (1882/1883–), born in Magarevo
- Ioannis Martzios, born in Kali Vrysi, Drama
- Nikolaos Manos, born in Drosopigi, Florina
- Evangelos Koukoudeas, born in Strumica
- Theodoros Adam, born in Nižepole
- Stephanos Dragoumis (1842–1923), founder of the Macedonian Committee in 1904, origined from Vogatsiko
- Ion Dragoumis (1878–1920), son of the previous
- Konstantinos Christou, Kapetan Kottas, (1863–1905)
- Evangelos Natsis (1876–1904), born in Asprogia, Florina regional unit
- Antonios Zois (–1946), born in Monastiri
- Armen Kouptsios (1880–1905), born in Volakas, Drama regional unit

=== Other famous ===
- George Zorbas (Katafygion Kolindrou, Pieria 1867 – Skopje 1942), Zorba the Greek, protagonist (fictionalized) of the novel by Nikos Kazantzakis
- Alexandros Natsinas, Lt General, the creator and first director (1953–63) of the Greek Central Intelligence Service.
- Ioannis Skandalidis (Salonica c. 1775 – 1826), politician and secretary

== Contemporary ==
=== Architects ===
- Stamatis Kleanthes (1802–1862)
- Lysandros Kaftanzoglou (1811–1885)
- Aristotelis Zachos (1871–1939)
- Alexander Dragoumis (1891–1977)

=== Athletes ===
Greek-Macedonian-Australian * Mark Philippoussis – tennis player

==== Archery ====
- Evangelia Psarra (born 1974)
- Fotini Vavatsi (born 1974)
- Elpida Romantzi (born 1981)

==== Basketball ====
- Giannis Ioannidis (born 1945) (coach also)
- Nikos Filippou (born 1962)
- Panagiotis Fasoulas (born 1963)
- Eleftherios Kakiousis (born 1968)
- Nikos Oikonomou (born 1973)
- Nikos Hatzivrettas (born 1977)
- Kostas Tsartsaris (born 1979)
- Dimitris Diamantidis (born 1980)
- Nikos Zisis (born 1983)
- Sofoklis Schortsanitis (born 1985)

==== Chess ====
- Hristos Banikas (born 1978)

==== Cycling ====
- Kleanthis Bargas (born 1978)

==== Football ====
- Nikolaos Aggelakis (1906–1986)
- Kleanthis Vikelides (1916–1988)
- Giannis Kanakis (born 1927)
- Alketas Panagoulias (1934–2012) (coach also)
- Giorgos Koudas (born 1946)
- Georgios Paraschos (born 1952) (coach also)
- Giorgos Foiros (born 1953) (coach also)
- Dinos Kouis (born 1955)
- Yiorgos Kostikos (born 1958)
- Nikos Karageorgiou (born 1962) (coach also)
- Nikos Nioplias (born 1965) (coach also)
- Dimitris Markos (born 1971)
- Theodoros Zagorakis (born 1971), captain of the 2004 Greece national football team and president of PAOK FC
- Vasilios Tsiartas (born 1972), member of the 2004 Greece national football team
- Alexis Alexoudis (born 1972)
- Zisis Vryzas (born 1973), member of the 2004 Greece national football team
- Nikos Dabizas (born 1973)
- Georgios Anatolakis (born 1974)
- Petros Passalis (born 1974)
- Traianos Dellas (born January 31, 1976), scored the only goal of the semi-final game in UEFA Euro 2004
- Vasilios Lakis (born 1976)
- Pantelis Kafes (born 1978)
- Angelos Charisteas (born February 9, 1980), scored the only goal of the final game of the UEFA Euro 2004
- Charilaos Pappas (born 1983)
- Panagiotis Lagos (born 1985)
- Dimitrios Salpingidis (born 1981)

==== Handball ====
- Dimitris Tzimourtos (born 1981)

==== Track and field ====
- Georgios Roubanis (born 1929), pole vault, Bronze Olympic Medalist Melbourne 1956
- Vassilios Papageorgopoulos (born 1947), sprinter and mayor of Thessaloniki
- Anna Verouli (born 1957), javelin thrower, Golden Medalist, European Championship 1982
- Konstantinos Koukodimos (born 1969), long jumper, politician, MP

==== Volleyball ====
- Kostas Christofidelis (born 1977)

==== Weightlifting ====
- Giannis Tsintsaris (born 1962)

==== Wrestling ====
- Apostolos Taskoudis (born 1985)

=== Presidents of Greece ===
- Constantine Karamanlis (March 8, 1907 – April 23, 1998), former President and Prime Minister of Greece
- Christos Sartzetakis (born in Thessaloniki, April 6, 1929), origin from Sklithro, Florina

=== Prime Ministers of Greece ===
- Stephanos Dragoumis (1842–1923), Prime Minister of Greece (January 10, 1910 – October 6, 1910)
- Evripidis Bakirtzis (1895–1947), first president of Political Committee of National Liberation, during World War II
- Constantine Karamanlis (March 8, 1907 – April 23, 1998), former President and Prime Minister of Greece
- Kostas Karamanlis (born September 14, 1956), (nephew of Constantine) former Prime Minister of Greece

=== Presidents of Greek parliament ===
- Constantine Ractivand (1865–1935), from Veria
- Philippos Petsalnikos (born 1950), from Mavrochori, Kastoria regional unit

=== Politicians ===
- Anastasios Polyzoidis, Meleniko (1802–1873)
- Philip Dragoumis (1890–1980)
- Alexandros Zannas (1892–1968)
- Michail Sapkas (1873–1956), born in Magarevo
- Markos E. Bolaris (born 1958), ex-Assistant Minister of National Economy, member of the Greek Parliament (Panhellenic Socialist Movement), representing Serres
- Theofylaktos Papakonstantinou, (1905–1991, Monastiri), journalist, minister of Education and Religious Affairs
- Nikolaos Martis (1915–2013)
- Traianos Nallis (born 1874 Gradešnica), member of the first Ottoman Parliament Second Constitutional Era (Ottoman Empire) 1908
- Dr. Stavros Nallis, first president of Makedoniki Amina established in Monastiri (1903) (Greek: Σταύρος Νάλλης Νάλης)
- Markos Natsinas (1925–2001)
- Stefanos Natsinas (1910–1976)
- Anastasios Dalipis (1896–1949), politician and army officer, from a village of Kastoria
- Stelios Papathemelis (born 1938)
- Georgios Lianis (born 1942), ex-Minister of Sports and journalist
- Giannis Ioannidis (born 1945), basketball player, coach, politician and minister of sports
- Vassilios Papageorgopoulos (born 1947), sprinter and mayor of Thessaloniki
- Georgios Orfanos (born 1953), ex-Minister of Sports and ex-football-player
- Georgios Papastamkos (born 1955)
- Evangelos Venizelos (born 1957)
- Panagiotis Fasoulas (born 1963), basketball player, politician, mayor of Piraeus
- Eva Kaili (born 1976), member of the European Parliament and news broadcaster
- Elena Rapti
- Liana Gouta chemical engineer, politician and first driver of bio-car in Greece
- Ioannis Gklavakis, member of the European Parliament

=== First Ladies ===
- Dimitra Liani (born 1955), wife of Andreas Papandreou
- Natasa Pazaïti (born 1966), wife of Kostas Karamanlis

=== Journalists ===
- Ioannis Vellidis, founder of Makedonia (newspaper) in 1911
- Nikolaos Mertzos (born 1936), founder of the magazine Makedoniki Zoi (Macedonian Life) in 1966
- Kostas Bliatkas (born 1957)
- Vicky Hadjivassiliou
- Rania Thraskia

=== Writers ===
- Zoi Karelli (1901–1998)
- Georgios Vafopoulos (1903–1996), born in Gevgeli, now in the Republic of Macedonia
- Dimitrios St. Dimou (1904–1990)
- Pavlos Papasiopis (1906–1977)
- Nikos Gabriel Pentzikis (1908–1993)
- Anthoula Stathopoulou (1908–1935)
- George Stogiannidis (1912–1994)
- Anthos Philitas (1920–1997)
- Kleitos Kyrou (1921–2006)
- Panos Thasitis (born 1923)
- Yorgos Ioannou (1927–1985)
- Nikos Bakolas (1927–1999)
- Dinos Christianopoulos (born 1931)
- Nikos Alexis Aslanoglou (1931–1996)
- Markos Meskos (born 1935)
- Vassilis Vassilikos (born 1934)
- Giorgos Chimonas (1936 or 1939–2000)
- Anestis Evangelou (1937–1994)
- Kostas Zouraris (born 1940)
- Demetris Th. Gotsis (born 1945)
- Nasos Vagenas (born 1945)

=== Actors ===
- Kostas Voutsas (1931–2020)
- Zoe Laskari (born 1942)
- Katia Dandoulaki (born 1948)
- Dimitris Starovas (born 1963)
- Antonis Kanakis (born 1965) comedian
- Alekos Sissovitis (born 1965)
- Mary Akrivopoulou (born 1975)
- Nadia Tass, director and actress from Florina

=== Filmmakers ===
- Maria Plyta (1915–2006) el:Μαρία Πλυτά, first Greek woman film-maker
- Nikos Vezyrgiannis (born 1964)
- Zahos Samoladas (born 1967)
- Patrick Tatopoulos, Greek-American movie production designer

=== Scientists ===
- Achilles Papapetrou (1907–1997), theoretical physicist
- Antonis Volanis (born 1948), industrial designer
- Dr. Kostas Kosmatopoulos (born 1950) bio-researcher
- Markos Papageorgiou (born 1953) electrical engineer
- Maria Spiropulu (born 1970), experimental physicist at CERN
- Sotiris Malassiotis (born 1971) researcher in informatics & telematics
- John Hadjidemetriou (born 1937) astrophysicist
- Kostas E. Psannis (born 1974) computer engineer
- Panagiotis Spyrou, heart surgeon
- Dimitrios Maronitis, classical scholar
- Evangelos Kofos, historian
- A.Phivos Christidis (1946–2004) linguist

=== Entrepreneurs ===
- Ioannis Boutaris (politician also)

=== Singers ===
- Stella Haskil (1918–1954)
- Marinella (born 1938)
- Stratos Dionysiou, (1935–1990)
- Manolis Mitsias (born 1946)
- Paschalis Terzis (born 1949)
- Kostas Makedonas (born 1967)
- Lizeta Kalimeri (born 1969)
- Despina Vandi (born July 22, 1969)
- Melina Kana
- Dionysia-Niovi Klavdianou, soprano
- Konstantinos Katsaras, (opera singer, born 1975)
- Petros Gaitanos, tr:Petros Gaitanos
- Kalliopi Vetta
- Eleni Peta
- Eleana Papaioannou (born 1983)
- Vassy, origin from Florina

=== Musicians ===
- Dimitrios Lalas (1844–1911), born in Magarevo, pianist, composer
- Emilios Riadis (1880–1935), pianist, composer
- Dimitrios Semsis (1883–1950), alias Salonikios, born in Stromnitsa
- Dionysis Savvopoulos (born December 2, 1944), composer, lyricist and singer
- Argyris Bakirtzis (born 1947)
- Nikolas Asimos (1949–1988), counter-culture rock artist
- Nikos Ziogalas (born 1953)
- Sokratis Malamas (born 1957)
- Giannis Aggelakas, (born 1959), singer and leader of rock band Trypes
- Marianthi and Sophie, founders of synthopop band Marsheaux
- Zak Stefanou (born 1984)

=== Models ===
- Mara Darmousli (born 1981)
- Marietta Chrousala (born 1983)
