= Konstantinos Michail =

Greek philosopher, physician, and linguist (1751–1816)

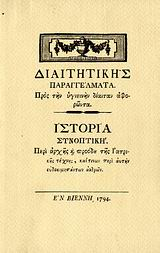
"Diatrikis".

Konstantinos Michail (Greek: Κωνσταντίνος Μιχαήλ; 1751–1816) was a philosopher, physician and linguist.

He was born in Kastoria. He spoke Greek, Latin, French and German and was a student of Michail Papageorgiou. He left all his books to the schools of Kastoria.

- List of Macedonians (Greek)

== literary works ==
- Dietetics, Vienna 1794
- Handbook of the Wise Doctor (Tissot)
