= Vrakas =

Vrakas (Greek: Βράκας) is a Greek surname that may refer to

- Daniel P. Vrakas (born 1955), American Republican politician and businessman
- Georgios Vrakas (born 2001), Greek football midfielder
- Zisis Vrakas, 19th century Macedonian-Greek Macedonian revolutionary
