= Georgios Parakeimenos =

Greek physician and preacher

Georgios Parakeimenos (Greek: Γεώργιος Παρακείμενος) was a physician and preacher. He was born in Kozani and later he studied medicine and philosophy at Padua. He was director of the Kozani school from 1694 to 1707.

== See also ==
- List of Macedonians (Greek)
