= Germanos Karavangelis =

His Eminence Germanos Karavangelis
- Γερμανός Καραβαγγέλης
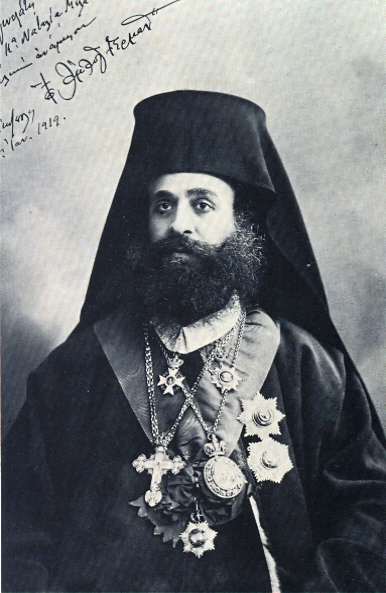
- Karavangelis as the Metropolitan Bishop of Amaseia c. 1919
- Born: Stylianos Karavangelis; June 16, 1866; Lesbos, Ottoman Empire
- Died: February 11, 1935; Vienna, Austria
- Occupations: Metropolitan Bishop; Revolutionary
- Organization: Hellenic Macedonian Committee
- Movement: Macedonian Struggle; Pontic Struggle
- Awards: Grand Commander of the Order of the Redeemer; Order of the White Eagle; Order of Saint Sava

Germanos Karavangelis (Greek: Γερμανός Καραβαγγέλης, also transliterated as Yermanos and Karavaggelis or Karavagelis, 1866–1935) was known for his service as Metropolitan Bishop of Kastoria and later Amaseia, Pontus. He was a member of the Hellenic Macedonian Committee and functioned as one of the major coordinators of the Greek Struggle for Macedonia.

== Early life and career ==
Germanos Karavangelis was born Stylianos in 1866, in the village of Stipsi at Lesbos island, then still under Ottoman rule. His father was a Psariot by the name of Chrysostomos and his mother was Maria. He had seven other siblings which included six sisters and one brother. When he was two years old, his family moved to Adramyttio, Asia-Minor (now Edremit, Turkey) where his father opened a shop. There, he attended school and was awarded a scholarship to study at the Theological School of Halki. He graduated in 1888, when he was ordained a Deacon and received the name Germanos. He then went on to study philosophy at the University of Leipzig and University of Bonn.

Germanos received a doctorate and went to Constantinople (now Istanbul, Turkey) where in 1891 he was assigned as a professor of Ecclesiastical History and Theology at the Theological School of Halki, where he had previously attended. As a professor, he wrote an encyclopedia of theology as well as scientific works and ecclesiastical discourses. In 1886, he was ordained a bishop with the title "Bishop of Charioupolis." At this new position, he fought for more Greek education and to curb anti-Greek sentiment. He assisted in sending Greek students abroad for higher education and was successful in recruiting 130 to the newly built Zografeion Lyceum. He also founded a girls' school by the name of "Karavangeli Girls' School." Karavangelis would also organize Sunday school classes and train new Clergymen.

From 1896 to 1900 he would serve as the Bishop of Pera (now Beyoğlu, Turkey).

== Metropolitan of Kastoria and the Macedonian Struggle ==
He was a Metropolitan Bishop of Kastoria, in communion with the Ecumenical Patriarchate of Constantinople, from 1900 until 1907, appointed in the name of the Greek state by the ambassador of Greece Nikolaos Mavrokordatos and was one of the main coordinators of the Greek Struggle for Macedonia that had an aim of defending the Greek and Greek Orthodox clerical interests against the Turks and the Bulgarians in then Ottoman Turkish-ruled Macedonia.

During the Macedonian struggle, Karavangelis directed the Greek response to supporters of the Bulgarian cause, the Internal Macedonian Revolutionary Organization (VMRO) and the Exarchate. At the time Karavangelis would travel in rural areas, and portrayed a fierce image of himself dressed with a dark raincoat, a bandolier on one side of his shoulder and a gun on the other with a scarf tied around his clerical hat. He would assist in raising the morale of those aligned with the Patriarchate and in organizing armed bands to fight the Komitadjis. Karavangelis viewed Bulgarian influence within the area as a threat to Greek interests. He advocated for close relations and interaction among Turks and Greeks in the region, but only in the context of when it was needed. Karavangelis viewed the rivalry between the Patriarchate and Exarchate as lacking religious dimensions and that the main concern preoccupying Balkan states was the post-Ottoman future of in the region after the empire was removed from Macedonia. Greece at the time sent more funds, men and arms to individuals such as Karavangelis in Macedonia. He was successful in returning many villages to the Patriarchate.

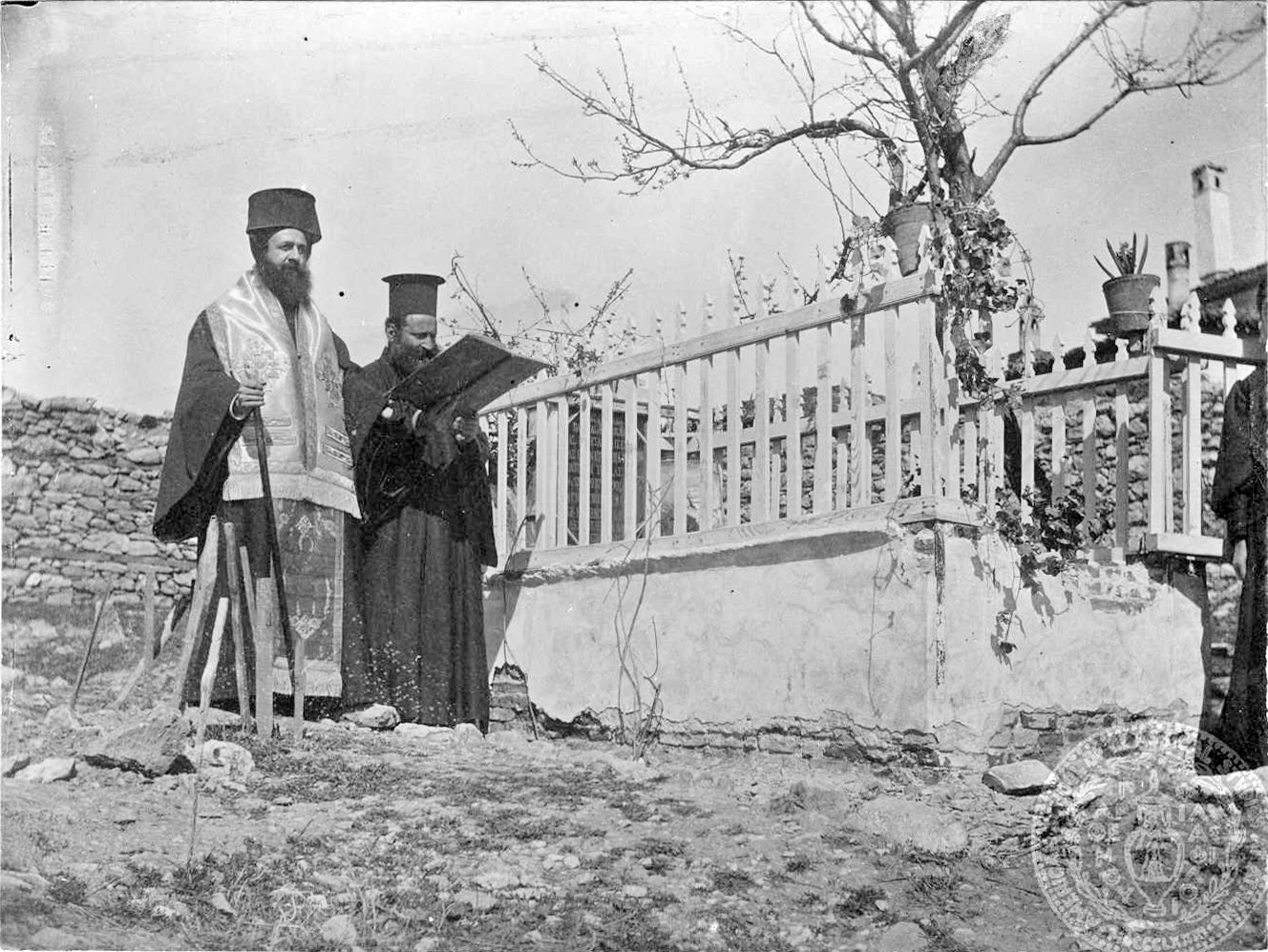
Germanos Karavangelis at the grave of Pavlos Melas.

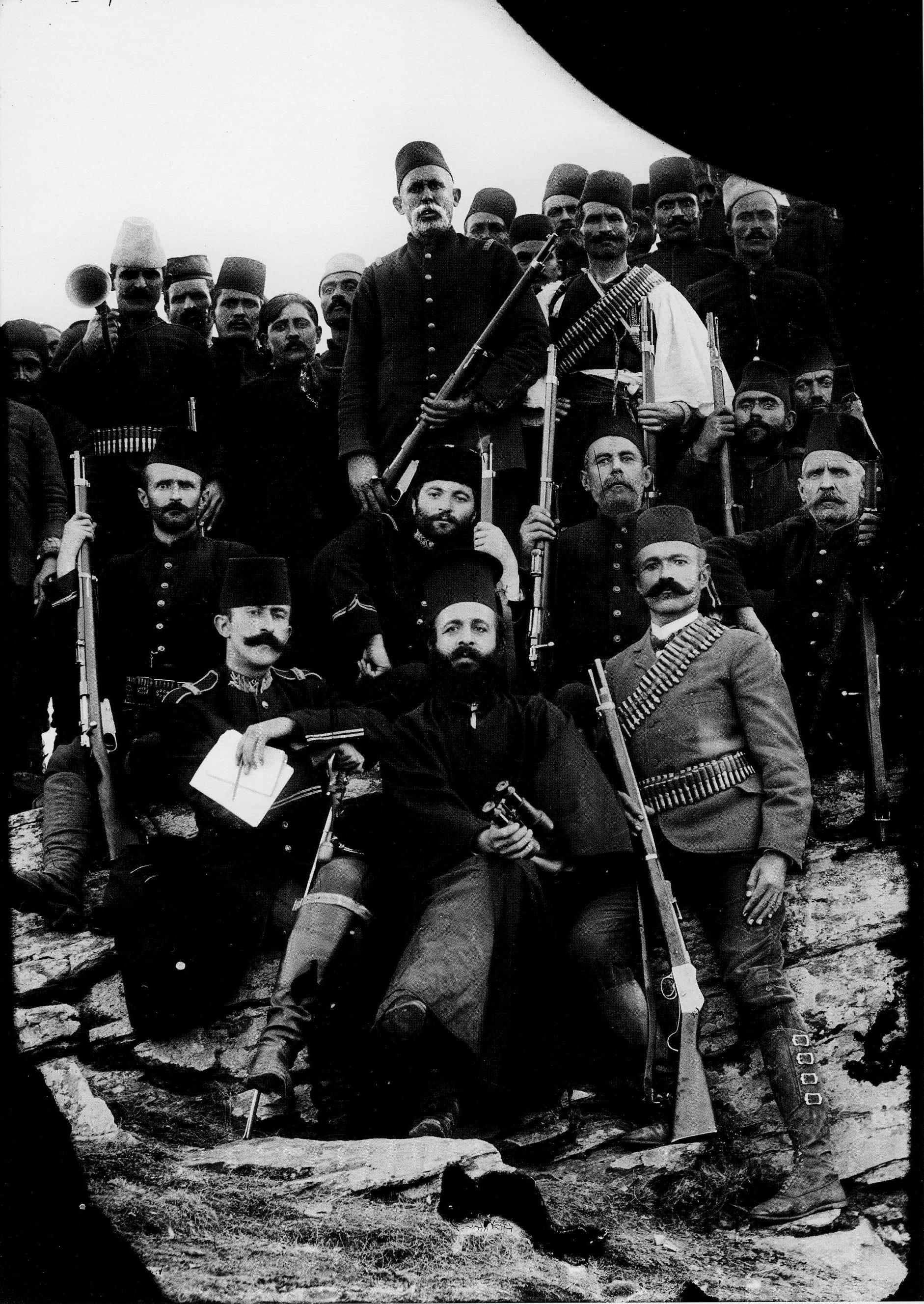
Germanos Karavangelis surrounded by Ottoman soldiers and officers in Kastoria.

Karavangelis organized armed groups composed mainly of Greek army officers and volunteers brought from Crete, the Peloponnese and other parts of Greek populated areas, and even worked with Pavlos Melas. He also recruited local Macedonian Greeks such as the chieftain Vangelis Strebreniotis from the village of Srebreni (now Asprogeia), and Konstantinos Kottas, a former member of IMRO, who in 1903, under the orders of Karavangelis, killed and beheaded Bulgarian revolutionary Lazar Poptraykov. The head was delivered to Karavangelis, which he placed on his desk and photographed.

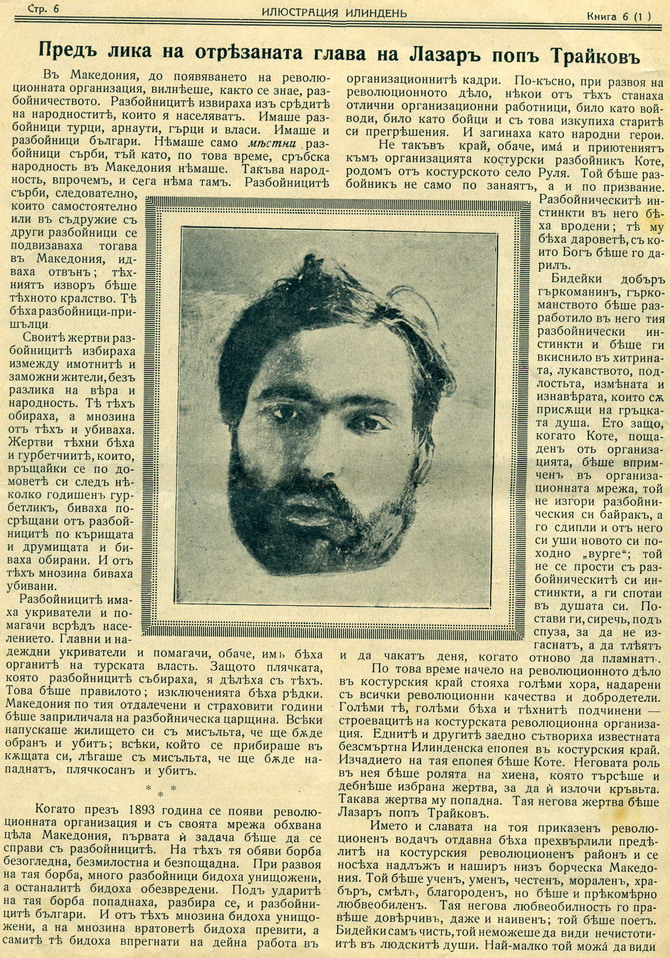
The head of Lazar Poptraykov on the desk of Germanos Karavangelis (1903).

In 1905, Karavangelis was present when Orthodox priest Kristo Negovani conducted the Divine Liturgy in the Albanian Tosk dialect. Karavangelis denounced the usage of Albanian in mass and under his orders had Negovani murdered. In 1905, Karavangelis also ordered the slaughter of resisting Bulgarian inhabitants in the village of Zagorichani (today Vasileiada).

Karavangelis succeeded in strengthen Greek aspirations in Macedonia and thus helped the later incorporation of the major part of Macedonia by Greece in the Balkan Wars, for which he is praised as a national hero of the Greek Struggle for Macedonia ("Makedonomachos"). He is the author of the book of memoirs "The Macedonian Struggle" (Greek: Ο Μακεδονικός Αγών).

== Metropolitan of Amaseia and the Greco-Turkish War ==
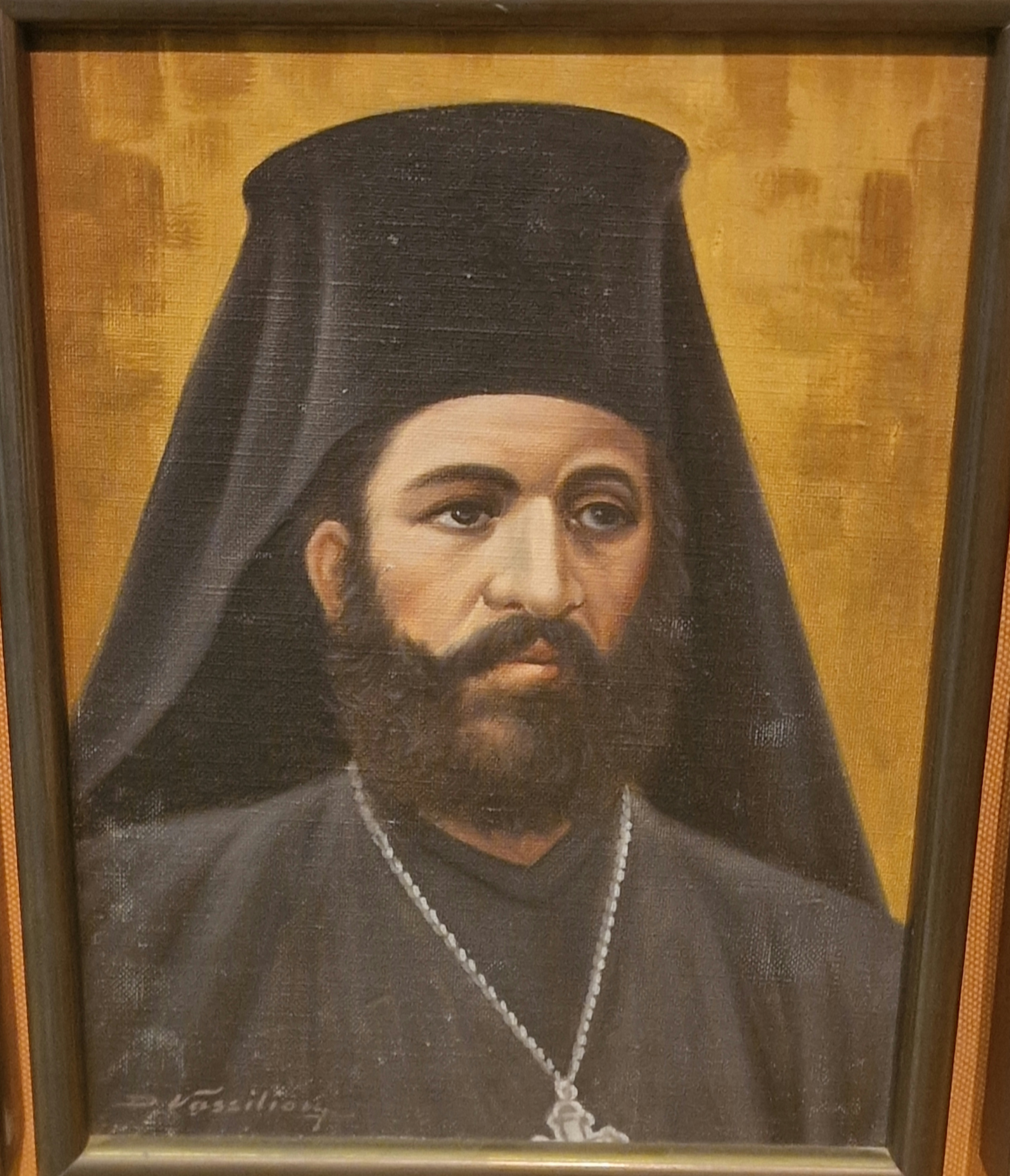
Portrait of Germanos Karavangelis from the Athens War Museum

In 1907, following Bulgarian complaints and Russian pressure, Karavangelis was removed from his position by orders of the Sultan. He returned to Constantinople as a Synod until the collapse of the Diocese of Amaseia in January 1908. The Patriarch had requested that Karavangelis fill the recently vacated position, and so he became the Metropolitan of Amaseia, based in Sampsounta. There, he helped create schools in the most remote villages and established a high school for Greek education. He also assisted in the formation of armed groups to defend the Greek and Armenian population from Turkish aggression and persecution by the Young Turks. During massacres of local Armenians, Karavangelis along with Chrysanthos of Trebizond and Bishop Efthymios were able to save hundreds by hiding them in the Metropolitan Church and other Greek homes. Their efforts were recognized by a United States-based Armenian newspaper. For his actions, he was arrested and sent to Constantinople in 1917, where he would remain in prison for some time.

Following his release and the intensification of the Greco-Turkish War, he was sentenced to death in absentia by Mustafa Kemal's military tribunal in 1921. In the same year, Karavangelis proposed a Greek-Armenian-Kurdish cooperation to subdue the Turkish Nationalist Movement, to the Greek Foreign Minister Georgios Baltatzis. This, however, would not come to flourishment. He was also large advocate for a Republic of Pontus which had made him an even larger target for the Turkish Nationalist forces.

In August 1922, he was in Bucharest for the coronation of Ferdinand I of Romania when disaster struck the Greeks. He got on the first ship to Constantinople, however he was not permitted to leave the steamer by the troops of Kemal. He was given a letter by the Patriarch which had notified him that if he left the boat he would be arrested and executed. The Patriarch appointed him Metropolitan of Ioannina for his own safety.

== Later career and death ==
In 1924, having been the Metropolitan of Ioannina for just over a year, Karavangelis received a letter notifying him of his appointment of Metropolitan of the Ecumenical Patriarchate based in Budapest. He initially protested, however, he was not listened to. Many believe Karavangelis was replaced based on his Venizelist views and he considered this appointment a mockery and a form of exile. in April of the same year, the Patriarchate proposed a transfer of the headquarters from Budapest to Vienna. After his relocation, he worked tirelessly to revitalize Greek communities in Austria and neighbouring Hungary and Italy.

In 1926, he was angered by the decision of dictatorial government of Theodoros Pangalos to cut his salary by over half and was forced to rely on donations for basic needs.

On February 11, 1935, Germanos Karavangelis died of a heart attack in a hotel south of Vienna at 68 years of age. He was buried in Vienna despite his request to be buried in Greece in his will.

== Legacy ==
Germanos Karavangelis ranks among the most well known participants of the Greek struggle for Macedonia.

He was awarded Order of the White Eagle and Order of Saint Sava.

His memoirs from the Macedonian Struggle were published in 1959. In 1992, his account, along with those of other Makedonomachoi, was included in Figures of the Macedonian Struggle, together with the "Affairs of Pontus" by Germanos Karavangelis by Antigoni Bellou-Threpsiadis.

Also in 1959, the "Institute for the Study of the Balkan Peninsula", along with the "Society for Macedonian Studies" (both of Thessaloniki) arranged the transfer of his bones, first to Thessaloniki, then finally to Kastoria.

There are monuments dedicated to him in Kastoria.

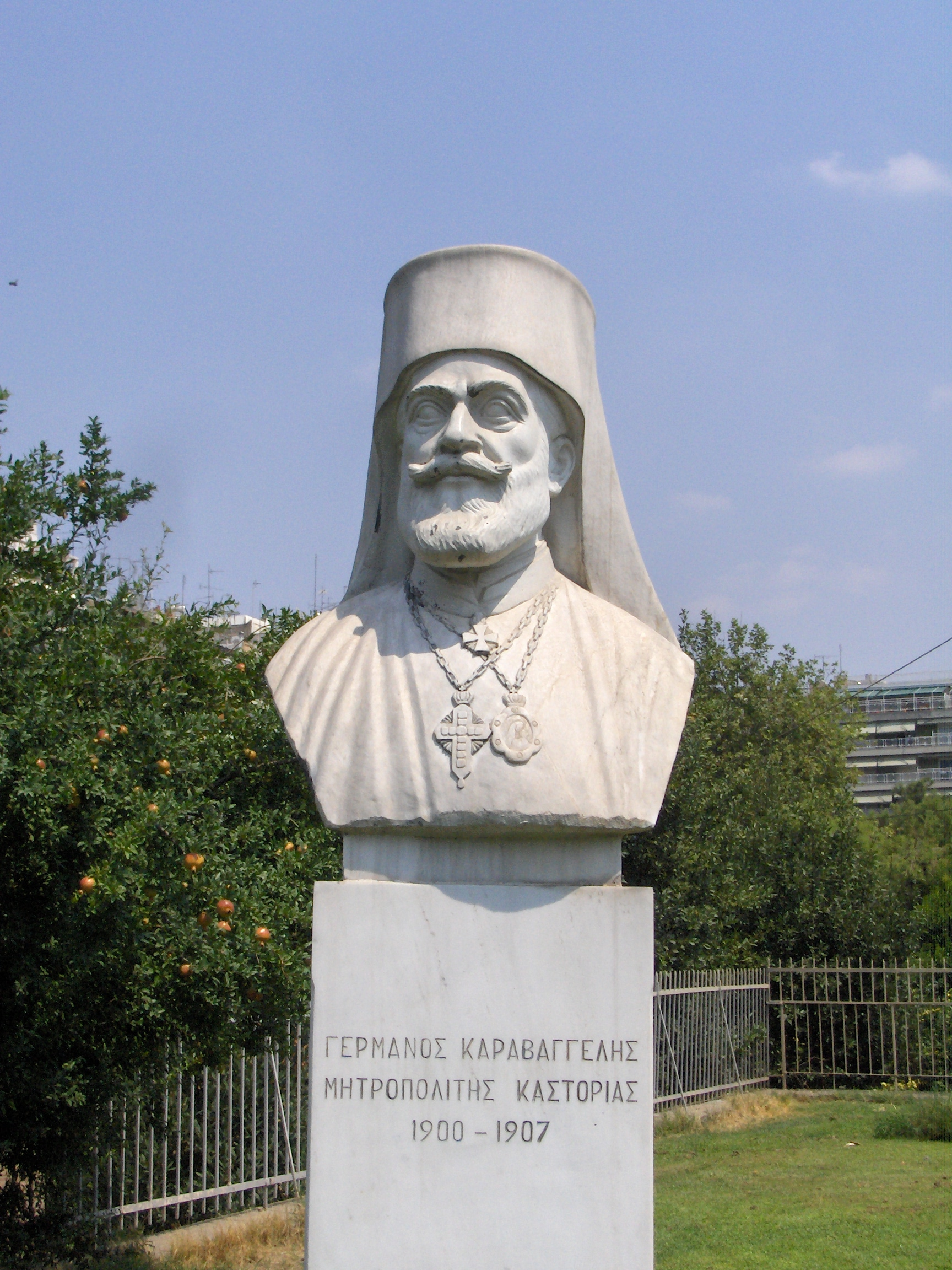
A bust of Germanos Karavagelis.

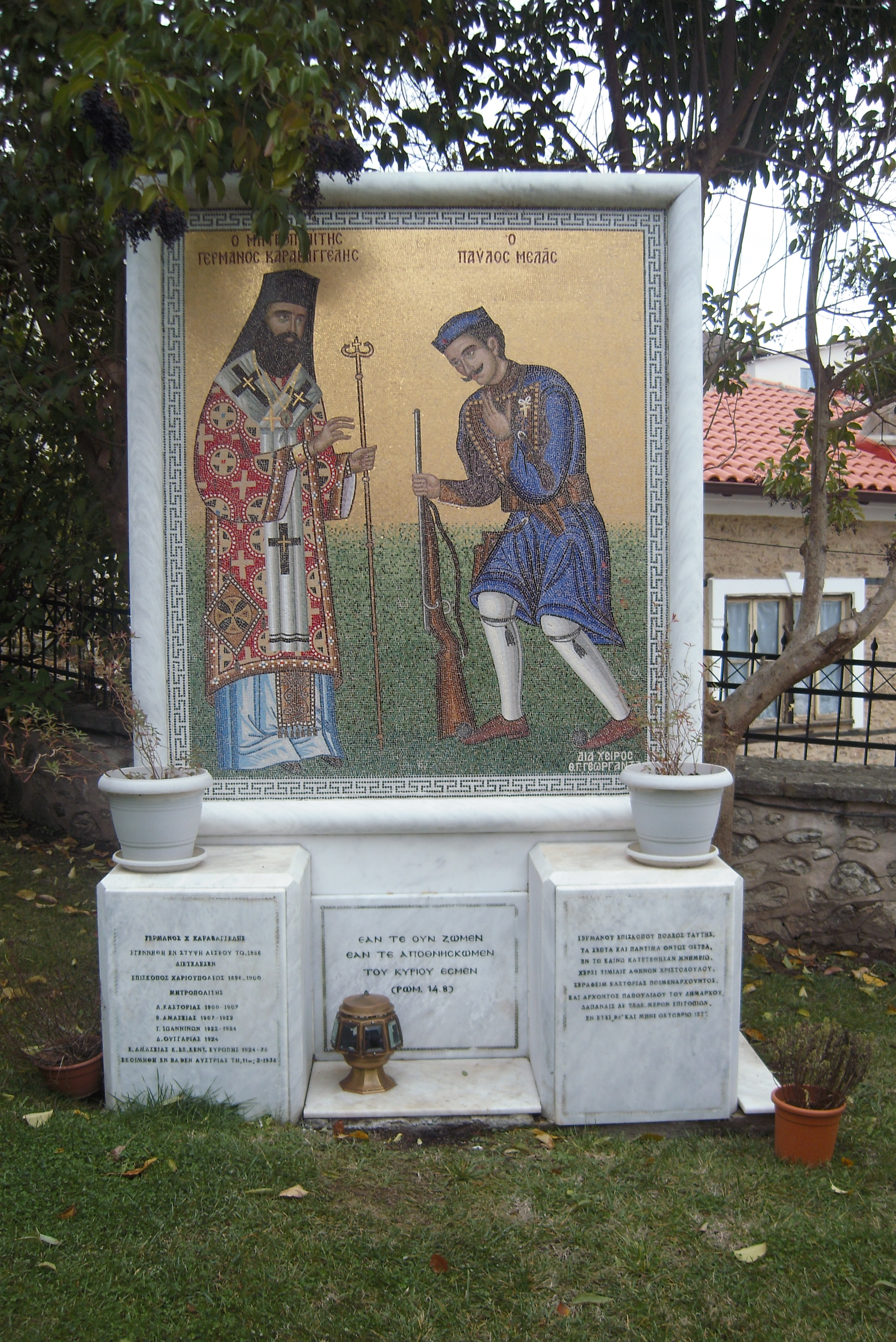
A memorial depicting Germanos Karavangelis (left) and Pavlos Melas (right).

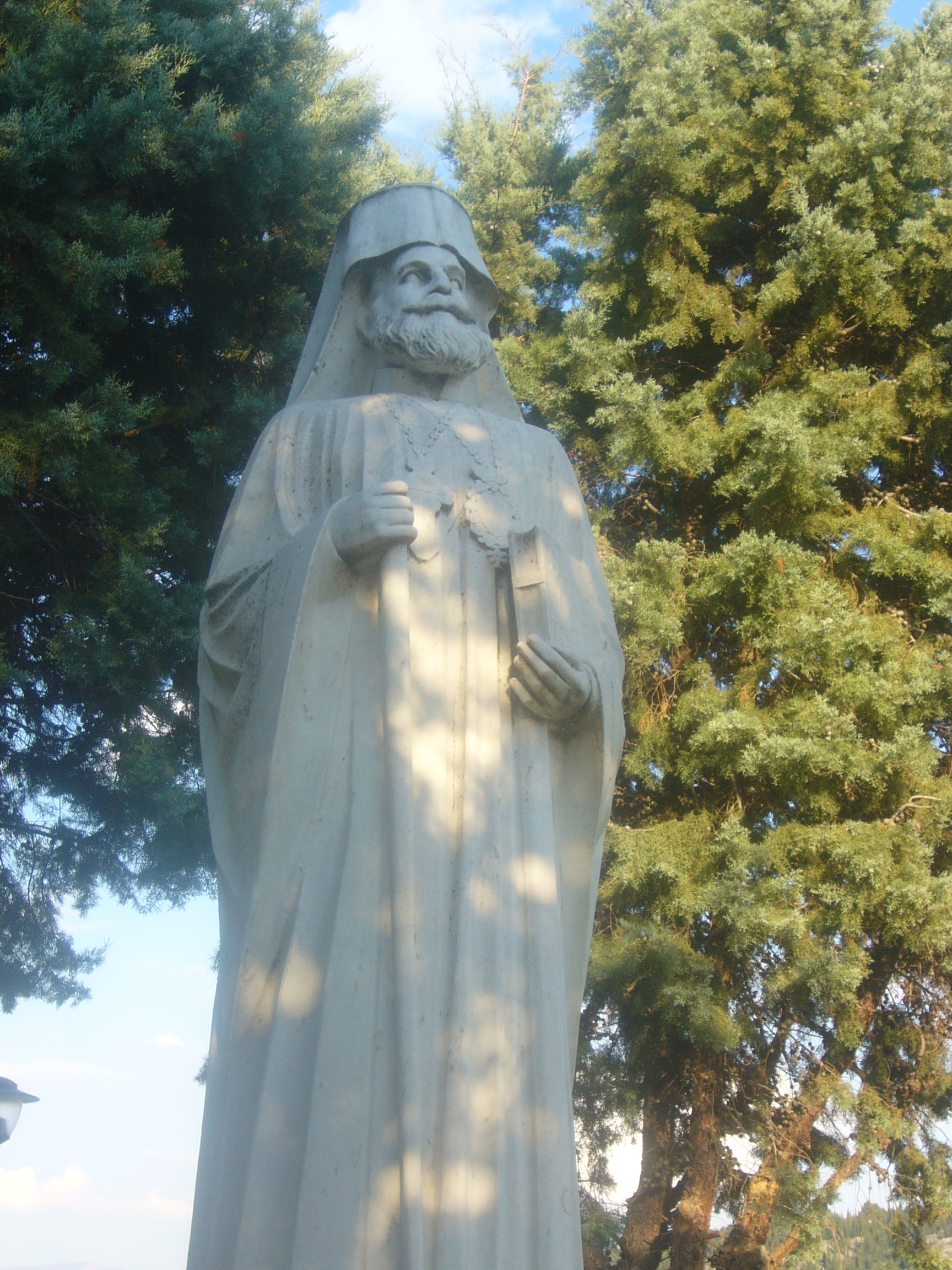
Statue of Germanos Karavangelis.

== See also ==
- Greek Struggle for Macedonia
- Pavlos Melas
- Anton Pasha
- (in Russian) Амасийская митрополия. Википедии. ("Metropolis of Amasya".)

Eastern Orthodox Church titles
Unknown	Bishop of Pera; 1896 – 1900	Unknown
Preceded by Athanasios Kapouralis	Metropolitan of Kastoria; 1900 – 1908	Succeeded by Ioakeim Vaxevanidis
Preceded by Anthemios Alexoudis	Metropolitan of Amaseia; 5 February 1908 – 27 October 1922	Succeeded by Spyridon Vlachos
Preceded by Spyridon Vlachos	Metropolitan of Ioannina; 1922 – 1924	Succeeded by Spyridon Vlachos
Preceded by –	Exarch of Hungary and Central Europe (Metropolis of Austria) (Note: Since 1924 all of the Greek parishes in the territories of Austria, Hungary and Italy came under the jurisdiction of the Patriarchate of Constantinople. However it was only in 1963 that the Greek Orthodox Metropolis of Austria was formally organized.) and Titular Metropolitan of Amaseia (Note: "Metropolitan Germanus was condemned to death in absentia by the Turkish authorities on June 7, 1921, and subsequently could not return to Turkey. He remained in Vienna as Exarch of Central Europe of the Ecumenical Patriarchate during the period 1924–1935."); 12 August 1924 – 10 February 1935	Unknown

== Sources ==
- Metropolitan of Kastoria Germanos Karavangelis. Foundation of the Hellenic World (FHW). Retrieved: 25 August 2014.
- Basil C. Gounaris. Social cleavages and national "awakening" in Ottoman Macedonia. East European Quarterly 29 (1995), 409–426.
- Basil C. Gounaris. Preachers of God and martyrs of the Nation: The politics of murder in ottoman Macedonia in the early 20th century. Balkanologie. Vol. IX, n° 1-2 | décembre 2005. Retrieved 27 August 2014.
- Basil C. Gounaris. "IX. National Claims, Conflicts and Developments in Macedonia, 1870-1912." In: Ioannis Koliopoulos (Ed.). The History of Macedonia. Thessaloniki: Museum of the Macedonian Struggle, 2007. pp. 183–213.
- Douglas Dakin. The Greek struggle in Macedonia, 1897-1913. Thessalonikē: Institute for Balkan Studies, 1966. 538 pp.
- Kiminas, Demetrius (2009). The Ecumenical Patriarchate: A History of Its Metropolitanates with Annotated Hierarch Catalogs. Wildside Press LLC. ISBN 9781434458766.
- Dimitris Livanios. "'Conquering the souls': nationalism and Greek guerrilla warfare in Ottoman Macedonia, 1904-1908." BMGS 23 (1999) 195–221.
- Julian Allan Brooks. "Shoot the Teacher!" Education and the Roots of the Macedonian Struggle." Thesis submitted in partial fulfillment of the requirements for the degree of Master of Arts. Simon Fraser University, Fall 2005. 191 pp.
- Lora Gerd. Russian Policy in the Orthodox East: The Patriarchate of Constantinople (1878-1914). De Gruyter Open, 2014. p. 10. ISBN 9788376560328
- Olga Balytnikova-Rakitianskaia. Pontian Genocide. ORTHODOXY IN THE WORLD (www.pravmir.com). May 19, 2010, 14:45. Retrieved 27 August 2014.

Greek Sources

- (in Greek) Πάνος Ν. Αβραμόπουλος. Μητροπολίτης Γερμανός Καραβαγγέλης - Ο ρασοφόρος Ακρίτας. Romfea.gr. Σάββατο, 11 Μαΐου 2013. Retrieved 25 August 2014.
- (in Greek) Μητροπολίτης Καστορίας (1900-1908), Γερμανός Καραβαγγέλης. Ιερά Μητρόπολη Καστοριάς (I.M. Kastorias). Retrieved: 26 August 2014.
- (in Greek) ΜΗΤΡΟΠΟΛΙΤΗΣ ΓΕΡΜΑΝΟΣ ΚΑΡΑΒΑΓΓΕΛΗΣ (1866-1935). Stipsi, Lesvos. Retrieved: 25 August 2014.
- (in Greek) Καραβαγγέλης, Γερμανός. Academic Dictionaries and Encyclopedias - Dictionary of Greek. 2013. Retrieved 25 August 2014.
- (in Greek) Τσαγκάρης, Παναγιώτης (Θεολόγος). Γερμανός Καραβαγγέλης. Ο Παπαφλέσσας της Λέσβου. Διακόνημα (Diakonima.gr). 18 Μαΐου 2010. Retrieved: 26 August 2014.
- (in Greek) Τάσος Αθ. Γριτσόπουλος. "Γερμανός. Ὁ Καραβαγγέλης." Θρησκευτική και Ηθική Εγκυκλοπαίδεια (ΘΗΕ). Τόμος 4 (Βυζάντιον-Διοκλής). Αθηναι – Αθαν. Μαρτινος, 1964. σελ. 400–402.
- (in Greek) Ψάρας, I., "O Γερμανός Kαραβαγγέλης και η ορθόδοξη Eλληνική Kοινότητα της Bενετίας (1924-1935)". Θησαυρίσματα 14 (1977), σελ. 275–287.

Related Sources

- Anastas Vangeli. Nation-building ancient Macedonian style: the origins and the effects of the so-called antiquization in Macedonia. Nationalities Papers: The Journal of Nationalism and Ethnicity, Volume 39, Issue 1, 2011. pp. 13–32.
- Panayiotis Diamadis. "Why Macedonia Matters." AHIF POLICY JOURNAL. Winter 2012–13. pp. 1–18.
- Victor Roudometof. Collective Memory, National Identity, and Ethnic Conflict: Greece, Bulgaria, and the Macedonian Question. Greenwood Publishing Group, 2002. 265 pp. ISBN 9780275976484
