= Athanasios Christopoulos =

Greek poet, scholar, and jurist (1772–1847)

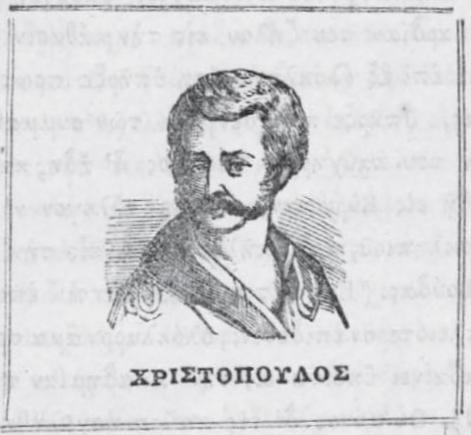

Athanasios Christopoulos (Greek: Αθανάσιος Χριστόπουλος; 2 May 1772 – 19 January 1847) was a Greek poet, playwright, a distinguished scholar and jurist. He has been proclaimed a champion of the modern Greek demotic and the forerunner of the national poet Dionysios Solomos. More importantly he is the first modern Greek poet to have his works - the Lyrika - published and read across a broad section of the European continent.

== Biography ==
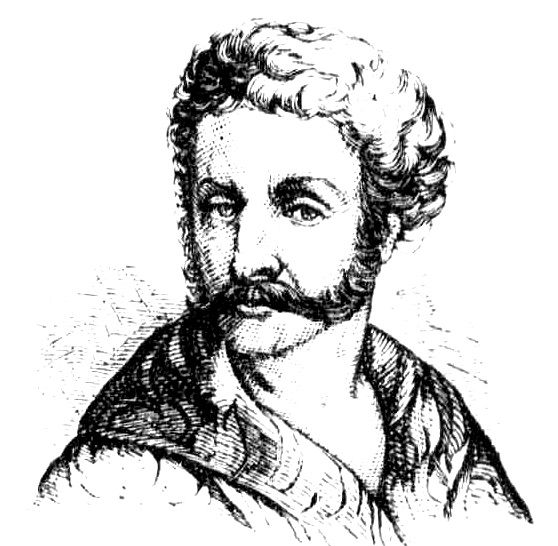
Athanasios Christopoulos

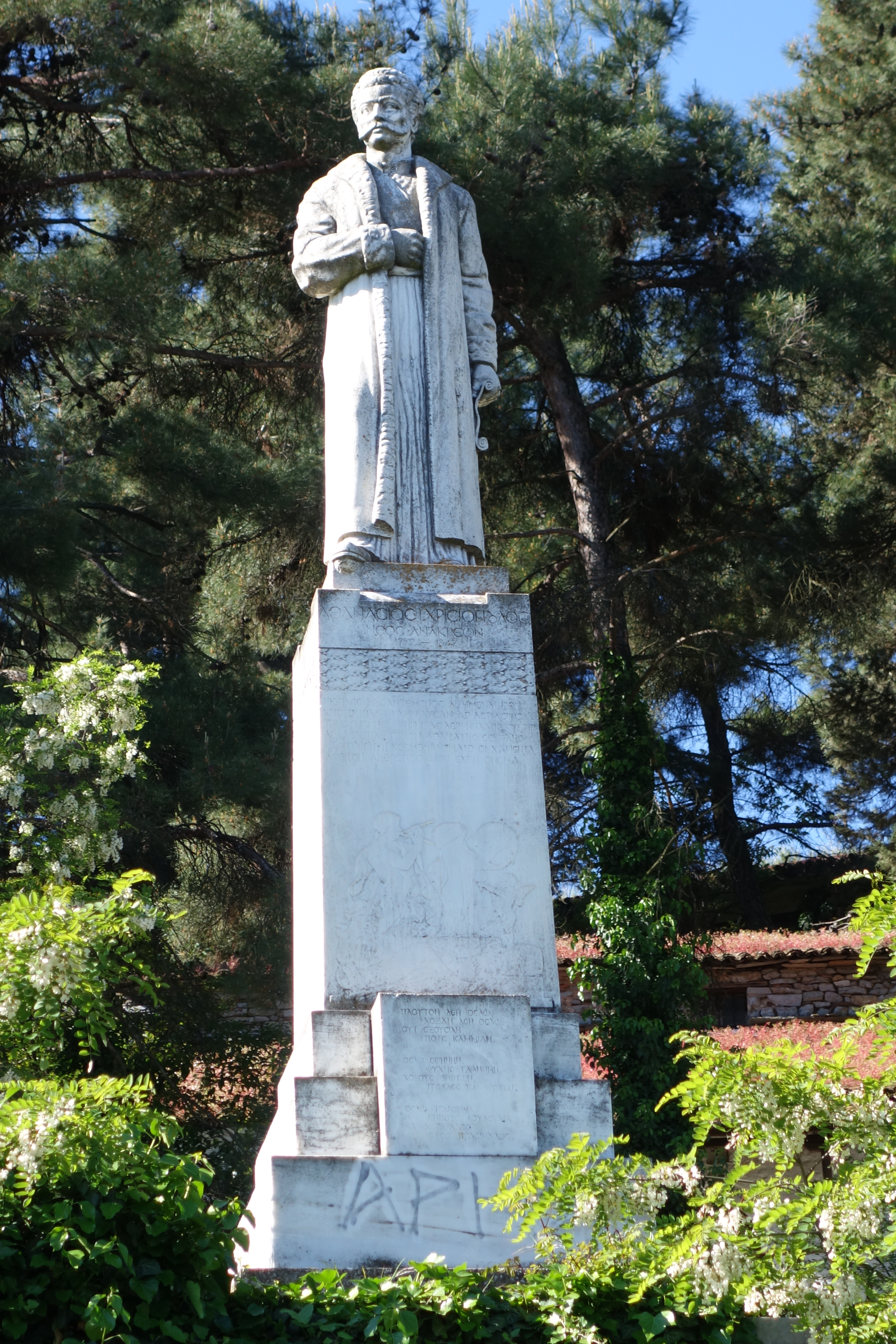
A statue in Kastoria

Christopoulos was born in Kastoria in Macedonia, Rumelia Eyalet, the son of Yiannis Christou, a Greek Orthodox priest, who expanded the family name to Christopoulos. In 1774, the family moved to Bucharest, in the province of Wallachia. Under the guidance of esteemed Greek teachers of the Diaspora, Athanasios mastered the basics of Greek literature and Orthodox theology. He read the literature of the ancients. He studied the writings of the Church Fathers. He admired the smooth verses of the Cretan poet Vitsentzos Kornaros, whose Erotokritos was to inspire him in his writing and theories on linguistics. He sang the folk songs of his native land. All these interests developed as the Greek administrators of the province, the hospodar princes of his youth – like Alexander Ypsilantis (1725-1805) and Nicholas Mavrogenes – cultivated the delicate climate of learning and culture around him. Christopoulos registered for courses in medicine at the University of Pest in 1792. Of course, this implies that he must have learned Latin, the official language of most universities. He spent about two years in the Hungarian metropolis before realizing that he was fascinated with the study of law. On a visit to Italy, in 1794, he decided to sign up for courses in medicine and law at the highly respected University of Padua. By 1797, he returned to Bucharest. For many reasons, least of which was personal dissatisfaction, Christopoulos decided to abandon the medical profession. He preferred to teach in the homes of the wealthy Greek families – the famous Phanariot Greeks – who were the bedrock of Bucharest's high society. In 1799, he became tutor to the children of Alexander Mourouzis, Prince of Wallachia. While in the court of Mourouzis, Christopoulos discovered that his patron was an accomplished man of learning. His deep love for education and the arts was apparent. He had established several libraries in the provinces and across the empire. With Mourouzis' encouragement, Christopoulos began to translate Homer's Iliad into demotic Greek by 1803, and in 1804, after Mourouzis transferred his court to Jassy, in Moldavia, Christopoulos penned his drama Achilles, also in the demotic.

In 1805, Christopoulos penned a very influential work entitled "The Aeolo-Doric Grammar" and it marks a revolution in Greek linguistics and literature. Its central premise is that no single Greek author succeeded in giving the Greek people of the Turkish occupation its very own grammar. He blames this on the antiquity-worshipping Greek intellectuals: men who demonstrated that their love for the ancient Greek world was greater than the educational needs of the Greek peasant, merchant, cleric and landlord. Though written in two months, the controversy it provoked went on for many years. Among his many critics, one stands out: Adamantios Korais, the famous patriot and intellectual whose crusade for a purified Greek tongue led to the artificialities of the katharevousa. Christopoulos continued the offensive by declaring that the genuine dialect of the common people and folk tradition – not that proposed by Korais – should be the national language of the Greeks. In an even more fascinating theory, Christopoulos proclaimed that the Aeolo-Doric dialect of the Macedonians, Epirots and Thessalians - not the Attic dialect of Pericles' Athens - was the true foundation of modern Greek. In response to building criticism he wrote: "Let us not become, O Greeks, ungrateful to it. We must not kick it about. Let us honor it, in our speech, and even in our writing."

In 1806, Mourouzis relocated once again and this time it was to his palace in Constantinople. Christopoulos, who was given the honorific title of "kaminaris" (the official who received the taxes imposed on alcohol and tobacco) accompanied his patron and was rewarded with access to his astonishing personal library. Christopoulos also managed to spend his summers in Halki with his close friend and colleague Iakovos Rizos Neroulos, who was to become a well-known dramatist. During these years Christopoulos' many poems were collected and finally published. In 1811, in Vienna, the "Lyrika" were published to great acclaim. The poems became well-known and distributed throughout most of Europe, particularly Germany, France and Italy. His peers proclaimed him the New Anacreon.

After the fall of Prince Mourouzis in 1811, Christopoulos departed Constantinople and returned to his home. Fortunately for him, the new hospodar John Caradja was well-disposed and eager to invite the poet to his court. Recognizing his legal education, Caradja elevated Christopoulos to the position of Logothete of Foreign Affairs. If it was thought that the title was purely ceremonial, the belief was proven to be incorrect: Christopoulos was called upon to draft a code of law for his new patron. The code was set down with the expressed purpose of bettering the plight of the masses. Thus, by 1818, the Wallachian Code of Law made its appearance. From the onset it was opposed by the nobility, who based their arguments on the premise that the Code sought to eradicate feudal rights. Caradja requested that the logothete issue a new edition. The first edition, however, remained in the record and evidenced clear influences from the French, particularly the political writings of François-Marie, marquis de Barthélemy and Baron Montesquieu. Perhaps the most compelling comparison was to the Napoleonic Code.

In 1817, Christopoulos had met and courted a younger woman of whom so little is known. She accepted his offer of marriage and soon thereafter became his wife. His wife shared no interest in the great talents of her famous poet husband, and oftentimes sought escape in the company of salon society. In time, the couple welcomed a son, Ioannis. His wife seemed unconcerned with the proper upbringing of her child, and Christopoulos hired a wet nurse. For a period of time, the marriage seemed to be on shaky ground. Added to this, the publication of the Code led to demonstrations against Caradja, who was eventually ousted from power by the Porte. Christopoulos, sharing his patron's disappointments while at the same time devastated by the state of his marriage, chose to escort the prince to Italy with his infant son and the wet nurse. His wife could not be persuaded to join him at any time.

In 1819, Christopoulos resided in the Caradja villa in Pisa. It was here that he probably met two literary giants of Romantic literature, Lord Byron and Percy Bysshe Shelley. In June of that year, Christopoulos left his son and wet nurse behind in Pisa and traveled to the Ionian island of Zakynthos [also known as Zante], where he came in contact with the leading literary figures of the period. While it would seem natural to expect some meeting, there is however no proof that Christopoulos met with the poet Dionysios Solomos, the man who would become acclaimed as the national poet of Greece, who resided there. That same year, Christopoulos also paid a visit to the city of Ioannina, which was governed by Ali Pasha of Ioannina, and shared the good company of the poets Athanasios Psalidas and Ioannis Vilaras. By the end of the year, Christopoulos traveled to the island of Corfu, where he probably made contacts with members of the secret patriotic society known as the Philike Hetaireia [Society of Friends] and became an initiate. While he passed the time in Corfu, he was also secretly corresponding with Alexander Ypsilantis, the man who was destined to proclaim the Greek War of Independence in the Danubian principalities in 1821. At some point in 1823, his correspondence with Ypsilantis was discovered by the British authorities. Fearing that he may be detained and arrested, Christopoulos immediately left the island and made haste for the solitude of the Transylvanian Alps.

Upon his return to Wallachia, Christopoulos settled in a house in the village of Sibiu and was joined by his son and repentant wife. Here he learned of the tragedy of Ypsilantis' campaign and the Turkish reprisals against the Greek communities. He also learned of the revolt proclaimed on the Greek mainland and Aegean islands. He was nevertheless in a world of spiritual and artistic exhaustion. He retired into private life and devoted himself wholly to literature promoting the demotic form of the Greek language. He also decided to present a work that would guide his struggling fellow Greeks in their revolt. His Political Parallels is an analysis of political systems from antiquity to the modern age. He boldly stated that all political systems have no value whatsoever if there is a lack of able and qualified leaders. Any emphasis on self-interest and state-sponsored violence is destructive. While the Greeks read his treatise, Christopoulos was congratulatory towards the July Revolution of 1830 in Paris, which brought forth the constitutional monarchy of Louis-Philippe. It so happened that at this time Christopoulos' rival, Korais, was busily promoting a fully democratic system based on the ancient Athenian model.

With the assassination of Ioannis Kapodistrias, the first Greek head of state, in 1831, and the coming of the Bavarian king Othon (Otto of Greece) to Greece, Christopoulos decided to break his silence and embark on another trip to his native land. One odd reason for the journey was a report originating from friends in Greece that he had been proclaimed deceased. He arrived in Piraeus in 1836, hoping to put the story of his death to rest. Having barely settled in his lodgings, Christopoulos was inundated with cheers and well-wishes from hundreds, including the poets Alexandros Soutsos, Alexandros Rizos Rangavis and his friend Iakovos Neroulos. He made his way to Athens, the capital of the Greek state, and visited the ancient sites, taking particular satisfaction in a tour of the Acropolis. At the same, disappointment with the images of poverty, political and social disorganization, corruption and violence left him in a state of displeasure. He discovered that the government had put newspaper reporters and intellectuals on trial; he learned how famous warriors, like Theodoros Kolokotronis, were despised by the royal court; thieves would break into houses while police remained idle; the king's Bavarians were exercising unchecked authority and pillaging the country; and all the young king was concerned with was his search for a queen. His friends and acquaintances even seemed distant to him and looked only for their own promotions. This was a disappointment he never anticipated. He abruptly cancelled his stay and decided to return home.

Christopoulos spent the remaining years of his life serving the new hospodar Alexandru II Ghica and putting his literary affairs in order. He died in his bed with his family at his side on 19 January 1847.

His Hellenika Archaiologemata (Athens, 1853) contains an account of his life. Thomas K. Papathomas (1872-1936), a poet from Kastoria himself, published Christopoulos's "Complete Works" ("Χριστοποὐλου Ἀπαντα" in Greek) in 1931-1932 in Thessaloniki (Spyros Syros Press).

== Work ==
- ΑΘΑΝΑΣΙΟΥ ΧΡΙΣΤΟΠΟΛΟΥ ΓΡΑΜΜΑΤΙΚΕ. ΤΗΣ ΑΙΟΛΟΔΟΡΙΚΕΣ ΗΤΟΙ ΤΗΣ ΟΜΙΛΟΥΜΕΝΗΣ ΤΩΡΙΝΗΣ ΤΩΝ ΕΛΛΗΝΩΝ ΓΛΟΣΣΑΣ. Vienna, 1805 (google)
- ΑΘΑΝΑΣΙΟΥ ΧΡΙΣΤΟΠΟΛΟΥ ΛΥΡΙΚΑ ΕΡΩΤΙΚΑ ΚΑΙ ΒΑΚΧΙΚΑ. Β' Ἔχδοσις τοῦ Ἐθνικοῦ Ἡμερολογίου. Paris, 1864 (google)
- Collection de monuments pour servir a l'étude de la lengue néo-hellénique. N° 11. Le premier chant de l'Iliade traduit en vers grecs vulgaires par Ath. Khristopoulos. – IΛIΑΔΟΣ ΡΑΨΩΔΙΑ Α. Μεταφρασθεῖσα εἰς δημοτικοὺς στίχους ὙΠΟ ΑΘΑΝΑΣΙΟΥ ΧΡΙΣΤΟΠΟΥΛΟΥ ΕΚΔΙΔΟΝΤΟΣ ΑΙΜΥΛΙΟΥ ΛΕΓΡΑΝΔΙΟΥ. Paris, 1870 (google)
- Poésies lyriques de l'Anacréon moderne, Athanase Christopoulos, publiées et corrigées par G. Théocharopoulos, de patras. Avec la traduction française en regard. Strasbourg (google)

== See also ==
- List of Macedonians (Greek)
