= Kallinikos Manios =

Kallinikos Manios (Greek: Καλλίνικος Μάνιος) was founder of the first school in Veroia.

He was born in Veroia on 1624. In the year 1642, he went to Rome and attended as a student the Greek college of Ayios Athanasios. He stayed there until 1647 and later he went to the Collegio Urbano. Later he returned to Veroia where he became active in the field of education (1649). He founded the first school in Veroia. He died in 1665.

- List of Macedonians (Greek)
