= Athanasios Stavroudis =

Greek chieftain of the Macedonian Struggle and spy

- Native name: Αθανάσιος Σταυρούδης
- Born: c. 1873; Baldzha, Salonika Vilayet, Ottoman Empire (now Melissochori, Greece)
- Allegiance: Kingdom of Greece; Third French Republic
- Branch: HMC; Hellenic Army; French Army
- Conflicts: Macedonian Struggle; Balkan Wars: First Balkan War; Second Balkan War; Battle of Kilkis-Lachanas; World War I: Macedonian front

Athanasios Stavroudis (Greek: Αθανάσιος Σταυρούδης) was a Greek chieftain of the Macedonian Struggle, soldier of the Balkan Wars and spy of the French Army during the First World War.

== Early life ==
Stavroudis was born in 1873 in Baldzha (now Melissochori) of Thessaloniki. He joined the Macedonian Struggle very early on, and as a prefect of the town, he was one of the key members of the National Committee of Baldzha. His mission was to inform the Defense Center of Thessaloniki about the movements of the Bulgarian armed groups and of the Ottoman military detachments.

== Career ==
Several times he took armed action with the Militia of Baldzha in order to defend against attacks by Bulgarian komitadjis. In November 1908, while the new regime of the Young Turks had launched a persecution against the Greeks, he fled to the Defense Center of Thessaloniki and then fled to Athens, along with his partner Stavros Baretis, from Balaftsa (now Kolchiko), where he came in contact with the Macedonian Committee there.

In 1912, Themistoklis Sofoulis contacted the Macedonian Committee of Athens to ask for help because the situation in Samos had become dangerous. The Ottoman-appointed Prince of Samos, Andreas Kopasis, had installed an Ottoman garrison on the island and the Greeks were being persecuted. The aims of the Macedonian Committee of Athens, as well as of Sofoulis and of the Greeks of Samos, concurred, as everyone was trying to liberate their homelands from the Ottomans. So, a collaboration was developed and Stavroudis met with Stavros Baretis and Themistoklis Sofoulis in order to organize the assassination of the ruler Andreas Kopasis.

=== Balkan Wars ===
Stavroudis, pretending to be a tobacco trader, went to Samos in February 1912 with Stavros Baretis and there he prepared the murder plan with locals. A little bit before the plan occurred and Kopasis got murdered by Baretis, he returned by boat to Athens. Later, he participated in both Balkan Wars and distinguished himself in the Battle of Kilkis in 1913.

=== First World War ===
During the First World War, he was assigned as a spy to the French Army to investigate issues related to Greek interests.

== Legacy ==
He was honoured with multiple medals for his contribution to the Macedonian Struggle and the Balkan Wars, while for his contribution to the Samos case a bust was erected in the town of Samos.

== Sources and references ==
- Ο Μακεδονομάχος Αθανάσιος Σταυρούδης και η εκτέλεση του Ηγεμόνα Ανδρέα Κοπάση, Κωνσταντίνος Τσαρούχας
- John S. Koliopoulos (editor), Αφανείς, γηγενείς Μακεδονομάχοι, Εταιρεία Μακεδονικών Σπουδών, University Studio Press, Thessaloniki, 2008, p. 60
- Επετηρίς Αγωνιστών Μακεδονικού Αγώνος 1903–1909, αύξων αριθμός 3904
