= Konstantinos Kallokratos =

Greek teacher and poet

Konstantinos Kallokratos (Greek: Κωνσταντίνος Καλλοκράτος) was a teacher and a poet.

He was born in Veroia in about 1589. He was a student at the Greek College of Ayios Athanasios in Rome between 1600 and 1610. There, he studied philosophy and theology. Later he taught at a school in Calabria. His bosom friend was Leo Allatius. Konstantinos Kallokratos was a brilliant man and a skilled poet.

== See also ==
- List of Macedonians (Greek)

== See also ==
- Byzantine scholars in Renaissance
