= Georgios Doitsinis =

Kapetan (Chieftain) Georgios Doitsinis
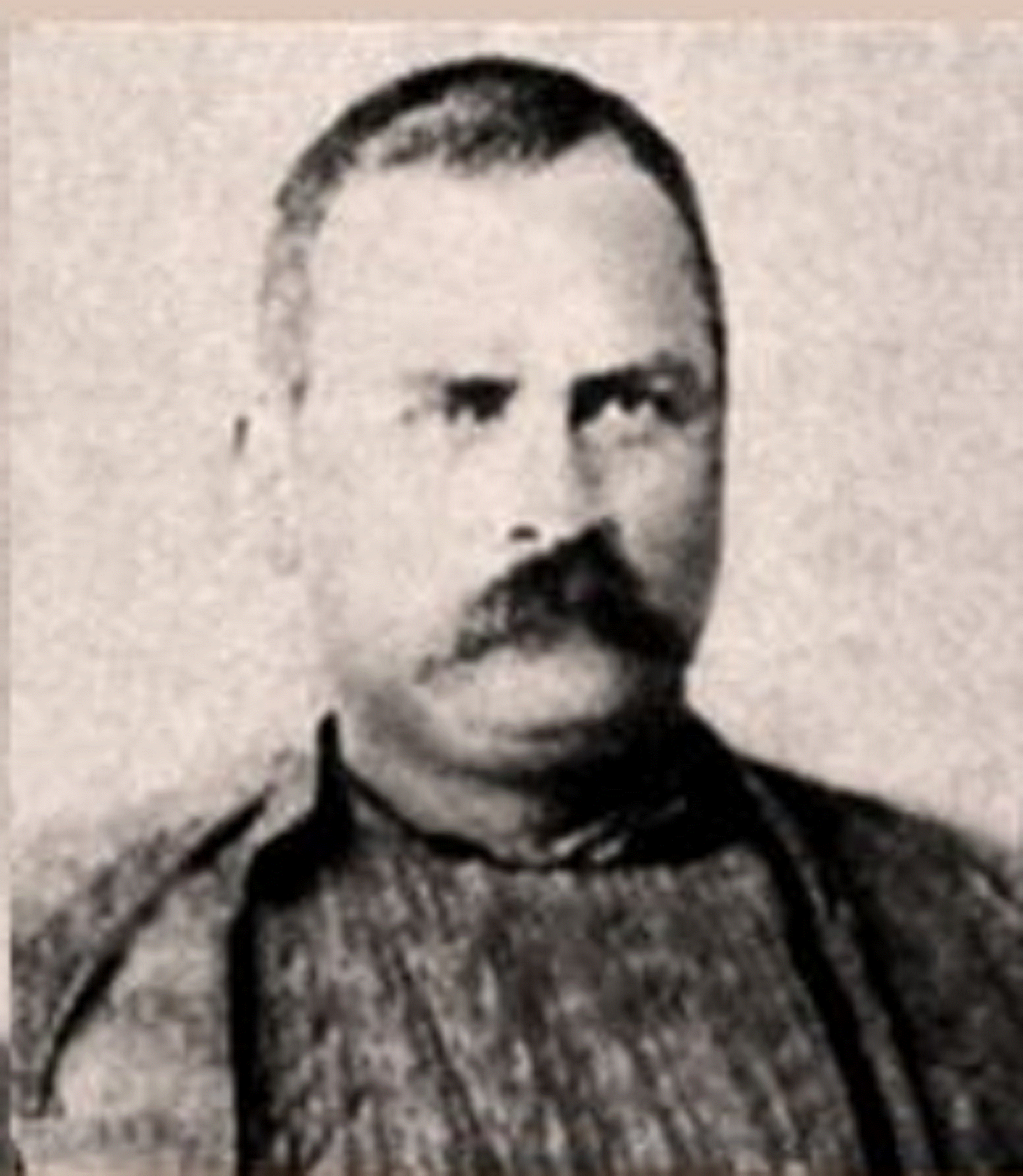
- A portrait of Doitsinis.
- Native name: Γεώργιος Δοϊτσίνης
- Born: c. 1880s Matsikovo, Salonika Vilayet, Ottoman Empire (Now Evzonoi, Greece)
- Allegiance: Kingdom of Greece
- Service / branch: HMC
- Battles / wars: Macedonian Struggle

Georgios Doitsinis (Greek: Γεώργιος Δοϊτσίνης; Bulgarian: Георги Дойчинов) was a Slavophone Greek chieftain of the Greek Struggle for Macedonia.

Doitsinis was born in the 1880s in Matsikovo (renamed Evzonoi in 1927) of Kilkis. He was the grandson of the Kodjabashi of Matsikovo Georgios Doitsinis, who had successfully defended several early Bulgarian activities. He was one of the first revolutionaries to set up an armed group in the areas of Bogdanci and Gevgelija, cooperating with the Greek Center of Thessaloniki since the autumn of 1904. His group consisted of local Macedonian and Cretan soldiers. He cooperated with chieftains Michael Sionidis, L. Papamalekos and Em. Katsigaris.

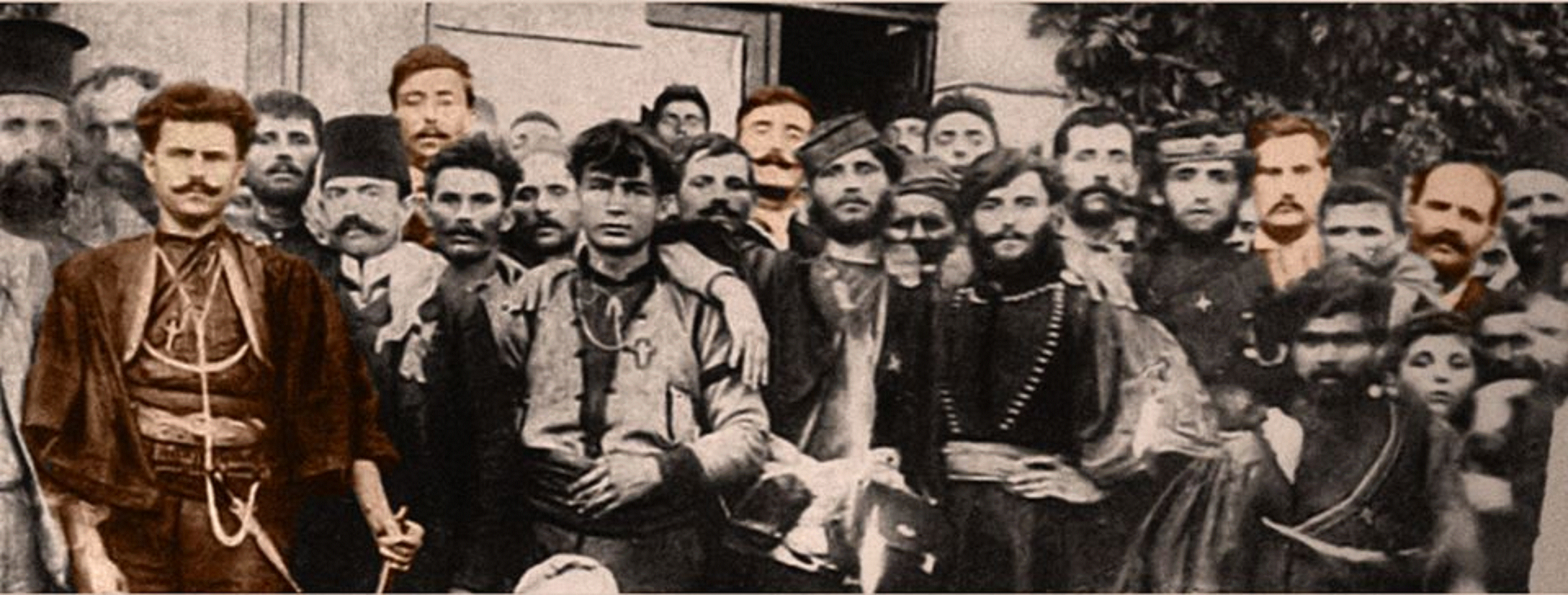
Georgios Doitsinis (second highlighted from the right) with other chieftains in Giannitsa including Gonos Yiotas (highlighted far left).

After the arrest of multiple Greek revolutionaries in Bogdanci and the dissolution of the group of Em. Katsigaris, Doitsinis was one of the most powerful Greek military presences in Central Macedonia. He managed with his group to defend the Bulgarian Komitadji attacks near Axios, from Karasouli (now Polykastro) to Valandovo and from Gevgelija to the mountain range of Kerkini.
