= Anastasios Michail =

Greek scholar (17th century-1722)

Anastasios Michail (Greek: Αναστάσιος Μιχαήλ, 17th century – 1722) was a member of Berlin's Academy of Sciences.

Michail was born in Naousa. He had his general studies in Ioannina with Georgios Sougdouris as his teacher of rhetoric and philosophy. In 1702 he met with distinguished German theologians in Constantinople. Later he went to Halle and was still later elected a member of the Berlin Academy of Sciences. He produced enlightening work for Christians and Greeks in Moscow, where he was renowned for his theological and philosophical knowledge. He was well acquainted with the Greek and Hebrew languages. He died in Russia in 1722.

== See also ==
- List of Macedonians (Greek)
