= Ioannis Kottounios =

Greek scholar (17th century)

Ioannis Kottounios (Ioannes Cottunius)
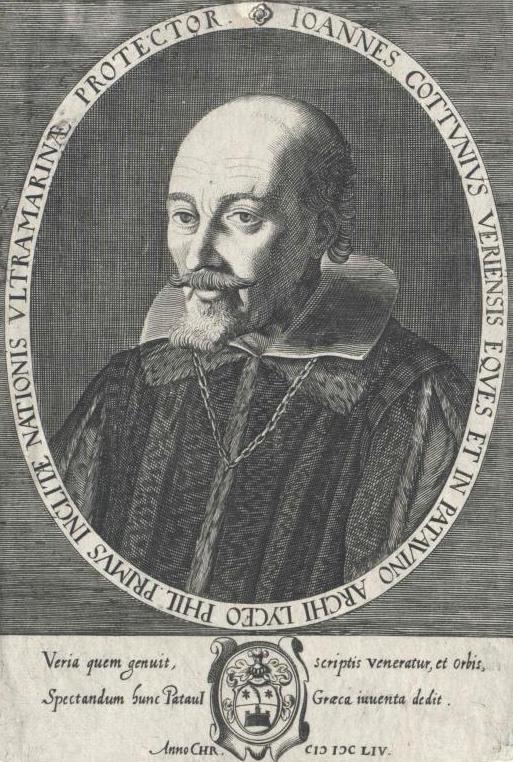
- Born: 1577; Veroia, Ottoman Empire
- Died: 1658 (aged 80–81); Padua, Republic of Venice

Education
- Education: Collegio Pontifico Greco; University of Padua

Philosophical work
- Era: Renaissance
- Region: Western philosophy
- Institutions: Collegio Pontifico Greco; University of Padua; University of Bologna
- Main interests: Medicine, Greek literature, theology and philosophy

Ioannis Kottounios (Greek: Ἰωάννης Κωττούνιος, Latin: Joannes Cottunius de Verria; c. 1577 – 1658) was an ethnic Greek scholar who studied philosophy, theology and medicine, taught Greek from 1617 and philosophy from 1630 in Bologna, Italy becoming professor of philosophy in 1632 he also founded a college for unwealthy Greeks at Padua in 1653.

== Biography ==
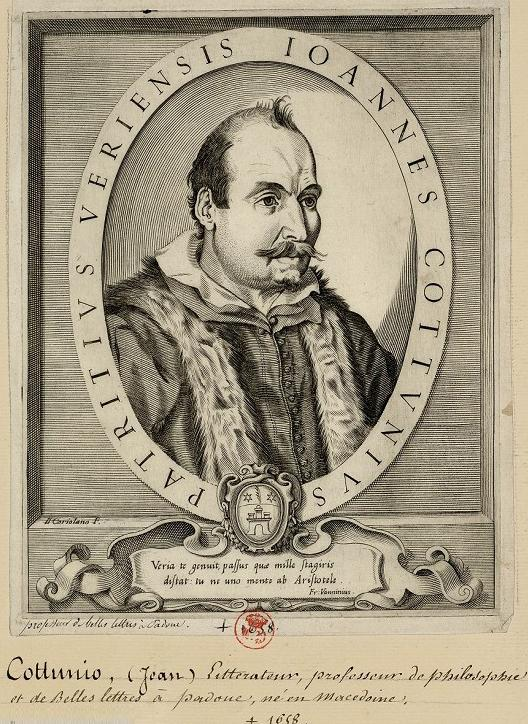
"Patritius Veriensis Ioannes Cottunius".

Ioannis Kottounios was born of Greek descent in Veroia (Karaferye), Rumelia Eyalet, Ottoman Empire in 1577. While in Wallachia he was arrested by Tatar brigands along with his brothers Charalampos and Angelos. Once ransomed he went to Germany with a recommendation letter written by Patriarch Raphael. There Ioannis and his brothers received further reference letters from Rudolf, Prince of Anhalt-Zerbst. He subsequently stayed in Tübingen where he may have studied under the philhellene Martin Crusius.

After a stay in Venice he went to Rome, where he studied at the Collegio Pontifico Greco of Agios Athanasios (1605–1613) associated with the church Sant'Atanasio dei Greci, which operated under a Venetian administration. During his time at the college he converted to Roman Catholicism from Greek Orthodoxy and became a member of the religious community of Virgin Mary. He studied Greek, grammar, theology and philosophy and subsequently taught these subjects to new students. He moved to the University of Padua in 1613 and began studies in medicine until 1615. From 1615, he taught rhetoric, poetry and the works of Aristotle at the University of Bologna. He published there his first two books. His second book De conficiendo epigrammate was dedicated to Louis XIV and was taken to him in person by a Cretan priest named Antonios Boumboulis. The Macedonian Kottounios was hoping in an initiative by the king of France for a crusade to liberate Greece, as did many of his fellow countrymen, including his former fellow student from Rome and French diplomat Leonardos Filaras from Athens. Following the death of Camillo Belloni, Κottounios was appointed associate professor of philosophy at the University of Padua in 1633. In 1637 he succeeded his former teacher, the renowned Italian philosopher Cesare Cremonini, at the Chair of Philosophy at the University of Padua. In 1648, he founded in Padua, the Cottunian College (Greek: Κωττούνιον Ἑλληνομουσεῖον), a boarding school for Greek boys. The nearly contemporary Venetian diplomat in Paris F. Marchesini wrote that the French helped financially in the foundation of the Cottunian College. It was under the administration of the Collegio degli Artisti and later came under the jurisdiction of the University of Padua. It was a theological college whose students were obliged to attend the Christmas and Easter Mass at the San Giorgio dei Greci in Venice. Kottounios was a friend of Martin Crusius, Leo Allatius and other personalities of his time. He was an eminent scholar and commentator on the works of Aristotle. He died in Padua, in 1657.

== Works of Ioannis Kottounios ==
- Ioannes Cottunius De triplici statu animae rationalis ad aures ac tenorem Aristotelis,, veraeque philosoph. hoc est ... opus, Bononiae, 1628.
- Ioannes Cottunius De conficiendo epigrammate liber unus, 1632, dedicated to Luis XIV.
- Ioannes Cottunius Manuale Scholasticum de vitiis et peccatis, Padua, 1635.
- Ioannes Cottunius Immortalitati Alcidii Philhellini, Padua, 1642.
- Ioannes Cottunius Commentarii in quatuor libros Aristotelis de Caelo, 1653.
- Ioannes Cottunius Commentarii lucidissimi in tres Aristotelis libros de Anima, 1656.

== See also ==
- Byzantine scholars in the Renaissance
- List of Macedonians (Greek)
