= Damaskinos Stouditis =

16th century Greek ecclesiastic and writer

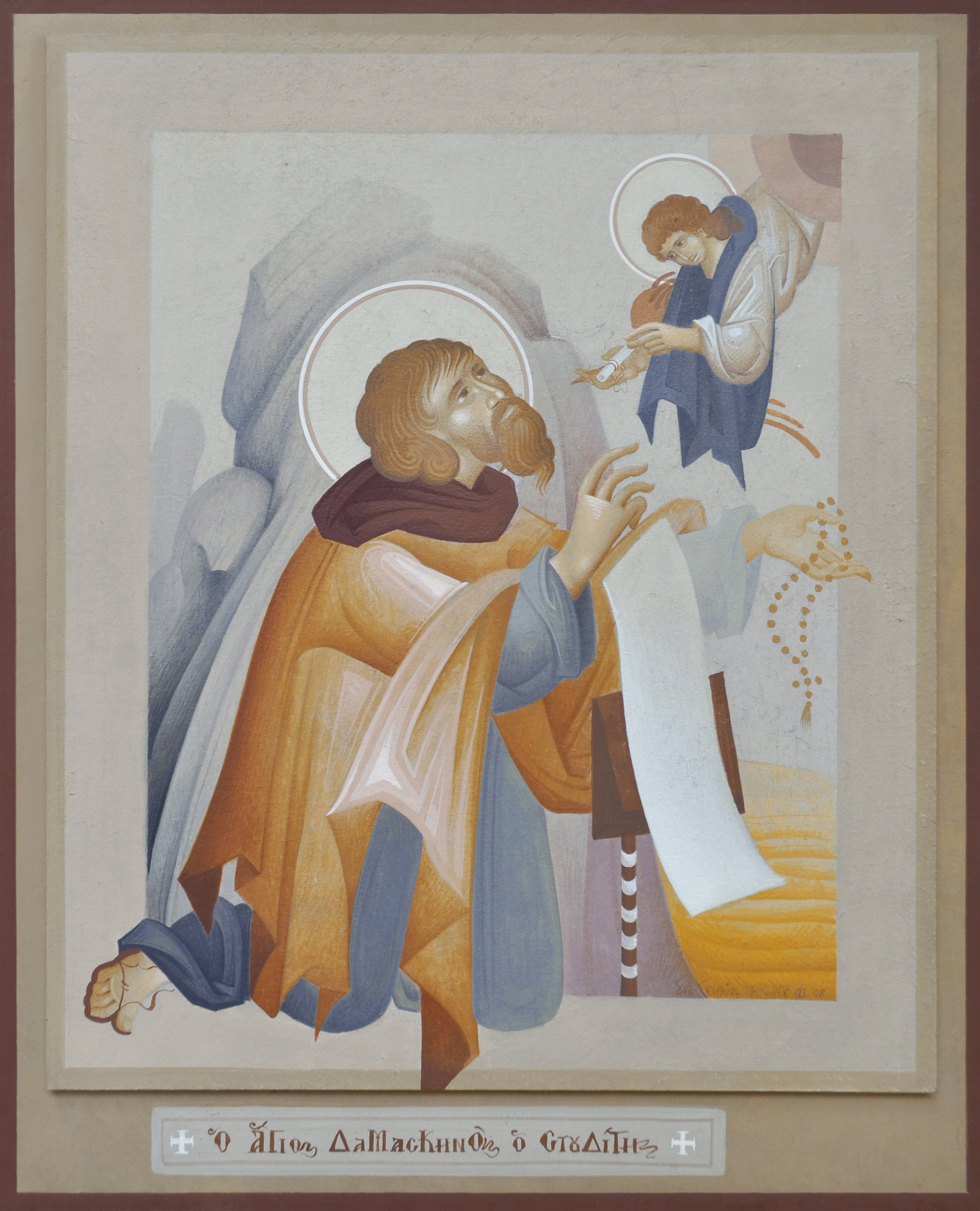

Damaskinos Stouditis (Greek: Δαμασκηνός Στουδίτης; Latin: Damascenus Studites) was a high-ranking Greek ecclesiastic and writer in the sixteenth century. Born in Thessaloniki around 1500, he became a monk in Constantinople, where he was a student of Thomas (Theophanes) Eleavoulkos Notaras at the Patriarchal Academy. In 1564 he was appointed Bishop of Lete and Rendina. In 1574 he was promoted to Metropolitan of Nafpaktos and Arta, and later became Patriarchal Exarch of Aitolia. He died in 1577.

Sometime before 1558, when he was still a subdeacon (ὑποδιάκονος), Damaskinos composed his most famous and popular work, the Thesauros (Θησαυρός), a compendium of 36 sermons devoted to passages of the Bible. Written in contemporary vernacular Greek, this work reveals Damaskinos’ wide knowledge of scriptural, patristic, historical and philosophical literature. Since its editio princeps in Venice in 1568, the Thesauros has been published in numerous editions. The text was translated into Turkish (1731; unpublished) and several Slavic languages.

== See also ==
- List of Greeks
- List of Macedonians (Greek)
