= Dimitrios Karakasis =

Greek physician (born c. 1734)

Dimitrios Karakasis (Greek: Δημήτριος Καρακάσης) was an ethnically Greek physician from the Ottoman Empire.

He was born in Siatista in about 1734. He went to Halle, in Saxony, where he studied medicine, philosophy and mathematics. He took a Degree in medicine in 1760. He exercised his occupation as physician in Vienna, Larisa, Siatista, Kozani, Bucharest, and also taught in his birthplace, Siatista, in Macedonia.

== See also ==
- List of Macedonians (Greek)
