= Grčište =

Grčište Грчиште
- Village
- Location within North Macedonia
- Coordinates: 41.256407°N 22.497948°E
- Country: North Macedonia
- Region: Southeastern
- Municipality: Valandovo

Population (2021)
  - Total: 176
- Time zone: UTC+1 (CET)
  - Summer (DST): UTC+2 (CEST)
- Website: .

Grčište (Macedonian: Грчиште) is a village in the municipality of Valandovo, North Macedonia.

== Demographics ==
According to the 2002 census, the village had a total of 255 inhabitants. Ethnic groups in the village include:

- Macedonians 255

As of 2021, the village of Grchishte has 176 inhabitants and the ethnic composition was the following:

- Macedonians – 171
- Serbs – 3
- Person without Data - 2

== People from Grčište ==
- Michael Sionidis, Greek leader of makedonomachoi in the Macedonian Struggle
