= Markos Natsinas =

Greek politician (1925–2001)

Markos Natsinas (1925 - 23 April 2001) was a Greek politician.

Born in Siatista, he grew up in Kozani, Greece. He studied law at the University of Thessaloniki and practised until he was elected as an MP for PASOK in 1977. He was elected overall three times up to 1989. He served as a vice president of the Greek parliament (1981–1985) and as Minister for Industry, Energy and Technology (from 1986).

He was married and had two children. He died in Oxford on 23 April 2001.
