= Andronikos Paikos =

Andronikos Paikos Ανδρόνικος Πάικος
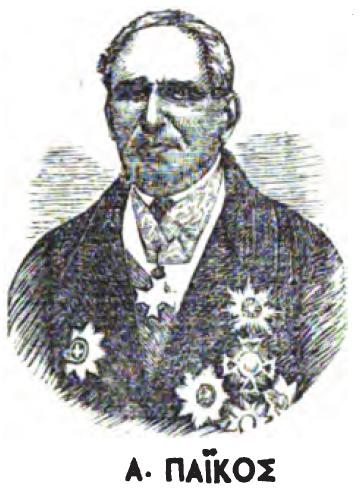
- Born: 1796 or 1799
- Died: January 22, 1880; Athens

Andronikos Paikos (Greek: Ανδρόνικος Πάικος, 1796 or 1799 – 1879) was a Macedonian fighter of the Greek Revolution of 1821, university professor, politician, representative in two national assemblies, and minister in three governments.

== Biography ==
Paikos was born in Thessaloniki in 1796 or 1799, the scion of a wealthy family. At the time of the outbreak of the Greek War of Independence in 1821, he was studying law at the University of Padua. He immediately gathered whatever funds he could, purchased guns and ammunition, hired a ship and sailed for Greece, arriving at Kalamata in November 1821. Over the following years, he participated in several battles of the War of Independence, being promoted to the rank of captain. After the arrival of Ioannis Kapodistrias as the first Governor of independent Greece, he left to complete his studies in Western Europe.

He was elected a representative in the Fifth National Assembly at Nafplion in 1832, but returned to Greece only in 1833. He gained the trust and esteem of King Otto, who appointed him Minister of Justice in the cabinet of Ignaz von Rudhart in 1837 and in Otto's own cabinet in the same year, where he also occupied the post of Minister of Foreign Affairs. He also served as prosecutor at the Court of Cassation.

He was elected as a representative to the First National Assembly of 1843 and later became again Minister of Foreign Affairs in the cabinet of Antonios Kriezis, serving from 1851 to 1854. He died in Athens on January 22, 1880.

== Sources ==
- The first version of the article is translated and is based from the article at the Greek Wikipedia (el:Main Page)
