= Dimitrios Stagas =

Greek soldier

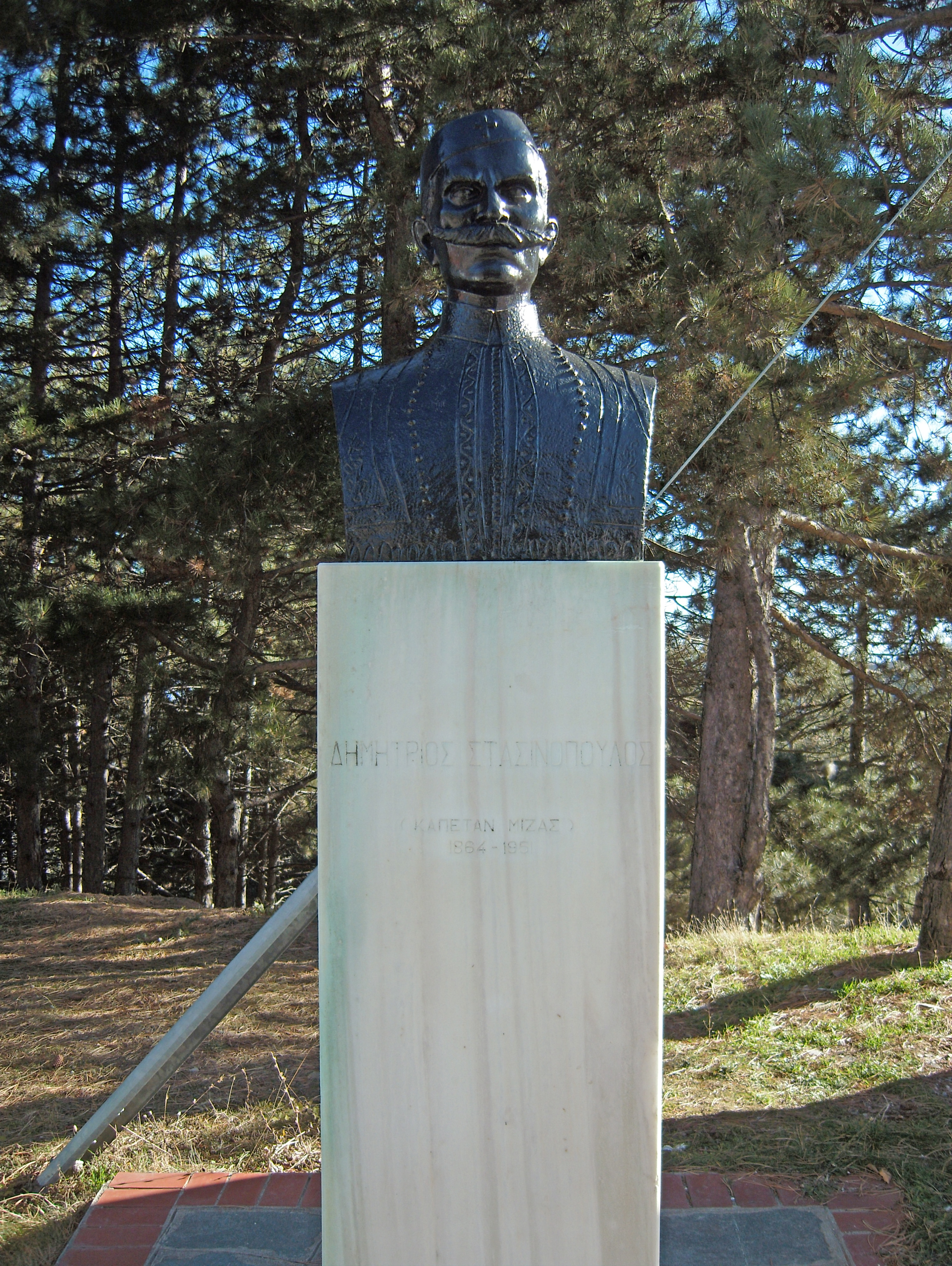
- A bust of Stagas in Kleisoura.
- Native name: Δημήτριος Στάγκας
- Nicknames: Kapetan Mizas; Καπετάν Μίζας
- Born: c. 1864 Kleisoura, Monastir Vilayet, Ottoman Empire (now Greece)
- Died: 1951 Kingdom of Greece
- Allegiance: Kingdom of Greece
- Branch: Hellenic Army
- Battles / wars: Macedonian Struggle; Balkan Wars; First Balkan War

Dimitrios Stagas (Greek: Δημήτριος Στάγκας) or Stasinopoulos (c. 1864–1951), known as well with his nickname Kapetan Mizas was a Greek chieftain of the Macedonian Struggle.

== Biography ==
Stagas was born in about 1864 in Kleisoura of the Kastoria region. He set up his own armed group which acted throughout the Macedonian Struggle, defending his hometown, Kleisoura, from Bulgarian raids, but also the retaliation of the Ottoman authorities. He acted in the regions of Kastoria, Verno, and Eordaia. He cooperated in several operations with Ioannis Karavitis. He was a member of the Struggle Commission of Kleisoura and the leader of the militia of Lechovo.

He also participated in various operations in the First Balkan War as a volunteer.

He died in 1951 at the age of 86 or 87.
