= Michail Papageorgiou =

Greek philosopher (1727–1796)

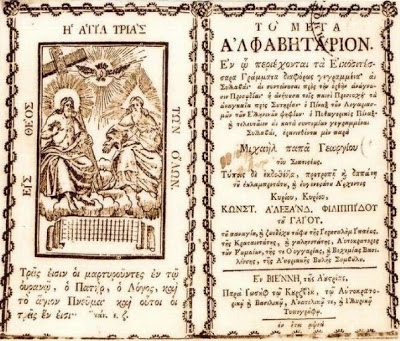
The First Greek Primer: "Megan Alphabetarion" by Michail Papageorgiou

Michail Papageorgiou (Greek: Μιχαήλ Παπαγεωργίου; 1727–1796) was a Greek philosopher.

He was born in Siatista in 1727. He studied philosophy in the Maroutsaia School of Ioannina under Eugenios Voulgaris. Later he visited Germany where he studied philosophy and medicine. He taught in his birthplace Siatista, and also in Selitsa, Meleniko, Vienna and Budapest. He died in Vienna in 1796.

== See also ==
- List of Macedonians (Greek)
