= Ioannis Gklavakis =

Greek politician

Ioannis Gklavakis (Greek: Ιωάννης Γκλαβάκης) (born 10 October 1949, in Thessaloniki) is a Greek politician. From 2004 to 2009 he was Member of the European Parliament (MEP) with the New Democracy, part of the European People's Party and sat on the European Parliament's Committee on Agriculture and Rural Development and its Committee on Fisheries.

He was also a vice-chair of the Delegation to the EU-Mexico Joint Parliamentary Committee.

== Education ==
- 1973: Graduate of Agronomy Faculty of Aristotle University of Thessaloniki

== Career ==
- from 1976: Nursery owner
- since 2003: Sole representative for Greece of the Italian Horticultural Research Centre (C.R.P.V.)
- 1984–2003: Board member of the Pan-Hellenic Confederation of Agricultural Cooperative Associations (PASEGES)
- 2002–2003: PASEGES Board Chairman (1990) and Vice-Chairman
- 1997–2004: Member of the New Democracy Central Committee
- 1990–1994: Member of the Aridaiai Municipal Council
- 1994–2000: Member of the Pella Prefectural Council
- 1981–2003: Chairman of the Pella Association of Nursery Gardeners
- 1990–1993: Member of Greek Nurseries Technical Committee (1983–2004) Board Member of the Thessaloniki International Exhibition
- 2003–2004: Board Member of the Greek Agricultural Research Institute (2001–2004), Vice-Chairman of the Greek Market Garden Society

== See also ==
- 2004 European Parliament election in Greece
