= Evangelos Natsis =

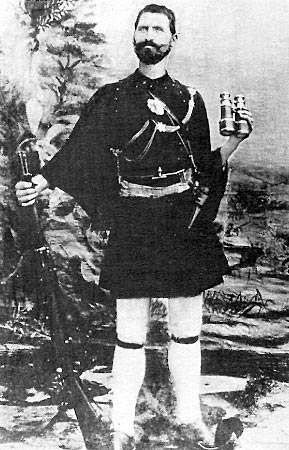
- Evangelos Natsis during the Macedonian Struggle.
- Native name: Ευάγγελος Νάτσης Γεωργίου; Вангел Начев Георгиев
- Nickname(s): Kapetan Srempeniotis (Καπετάν Σρεμπενιότης); Kapetan Vangelis (Καπετάν Βαγγέλης)
- Born: c. 1876; Srebreno, Monastir Vilayet, Ottoman Empire (now Asprogeia, Greece)
- Died: 12 May 1904; Aetos, Monastir Vilayet, Ottoman Empire (now Greece)
- Allegiance: IMRO (until 1901); Kingdom of Greece
- Service / branch: Hellenic Army; HMC
- Battles / wars: Greco-Turkish War (1897): Battle of Velestino; Ilinden Uprising; Macedonian Struggle †

Evangelos Natsis Georgiou (Greek: Ευάγγελος Νάτσης Γεωργίου) also known as Strempeniotis or Kapetan Vangelis, was a Slavophone Greek soldier and revolutionary who participated in the Greco-Turkish War of 1897 and the Macedonian Struggle.

== Early life ==
Evangelos Georgiou was born about 1876 in Srebreno, Salonika Vilayet, Ottoman Empire (now Asprogeia, Florina regional unit). It is said that his held distant roots from Epirus. He moved to Constantinople in his youth where he worked as a milkman and a mason.

== Armed Action ==
In 1897, he volunteered for military service in the Greco-Turkish War of 1897 where he would take part in the Battle of Velestino. He joined the Bulgarian IMRO, However, he would defect to the Greek side following his dissatisfaction with their treatment of the Greek population and an attempt on his life by a Komitadji. He would participate in the Ilinden Uprising of 1903 independent from the IMRO. In 1904, as a Makedonomachos, he would form one of the first organized armed groups with external Greek support in the Macedonian Struggle. He co-operated with Germanos Karavangelis, who brought him in contact with volunteers who had just arrived from Crete. He organized his own troop and inflicted many losses on the IMRO, most importantly the extermination of the Voivode Kirchev.

On 12 May 1904, returning from Monastir, he was killed in an ambush at Aetos, by the cheta of Aleksandar Turundzhev.

== Legacy ==
He was survived by his daughter.

A bust of him was erected in Kastoria in 1960.

There is a statue of him in his birthplace of Asprogeia.

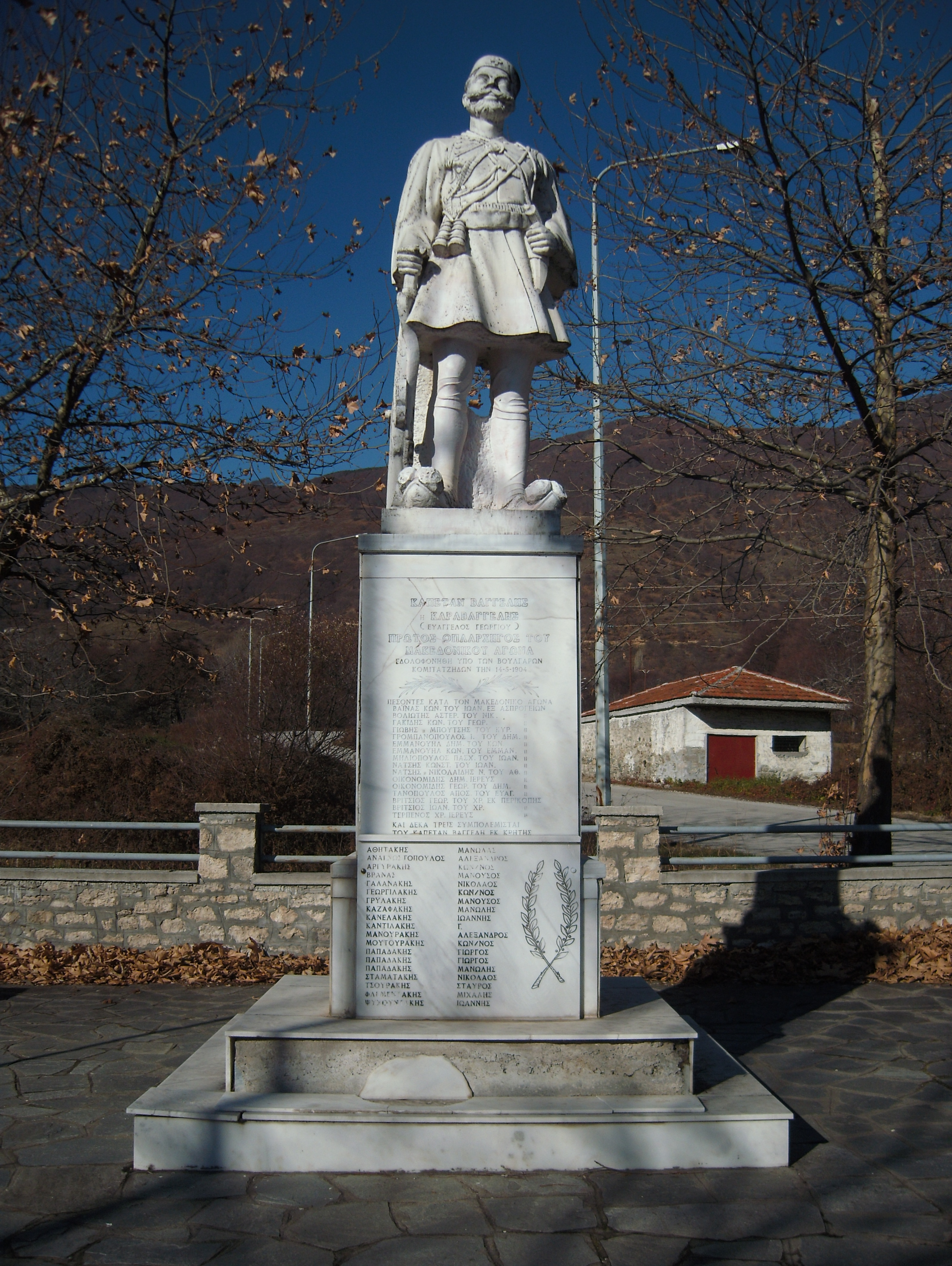
Statue of Kapetan Vangelis in Asprogeia.

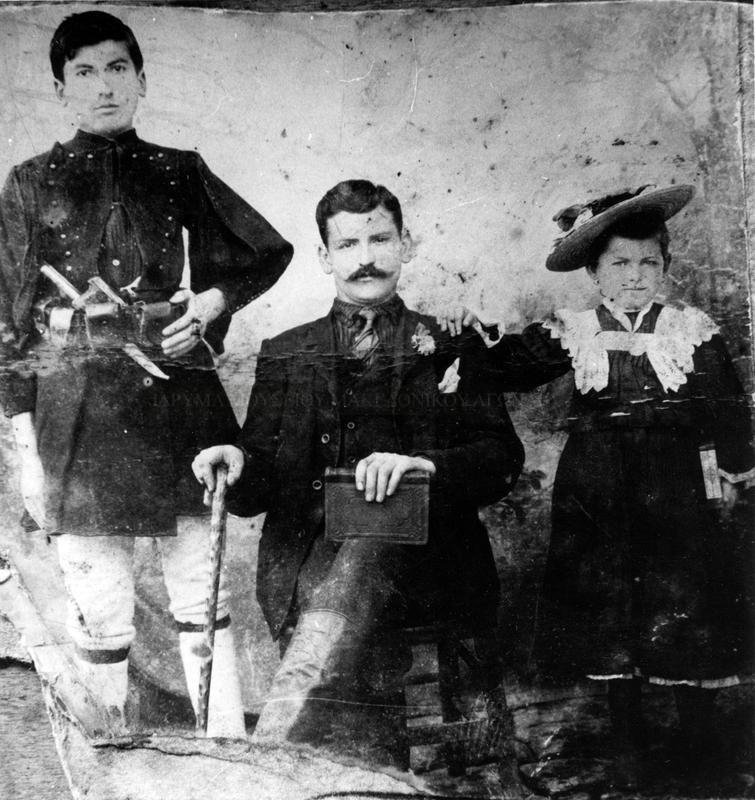
Evangelos Natsis (center), his daughter (right), and an unknown individual (left).

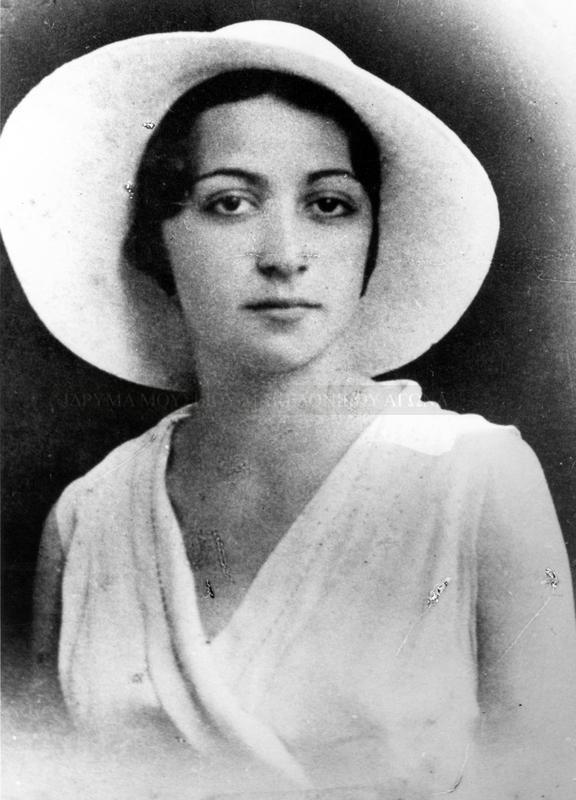
The daughter of Evangelos Natsis.
