= Athryilatus =

Greek physician

Athryilatus (Ancient Greek: Αθρυίλατος; 1st – 2nd century AD) was a Greek physician from Thasos, Macedonia. According to Plutarch's Symposiacs, he proposed two original theories: "Women endure cold better than men, they are not so sensible of the sharpness of the weather, and are contented with a few clothes" and wine ("an excellent refreshing remedy") induces cooling, sweating and sleep.

== Bibliography ==
- Ancient Library
- Symposiacs, by Plutarch (chapter3)
- Ioannis Kakavoulis. Greek Philology (Ancient and Byzantine). p. 15. published by Nikodemos in Athens.
