= Georgios Pentzikis =

Greek chieftain of the Macedonian Struggle

Kapetan (Chieftain) Georgios Pentzikis
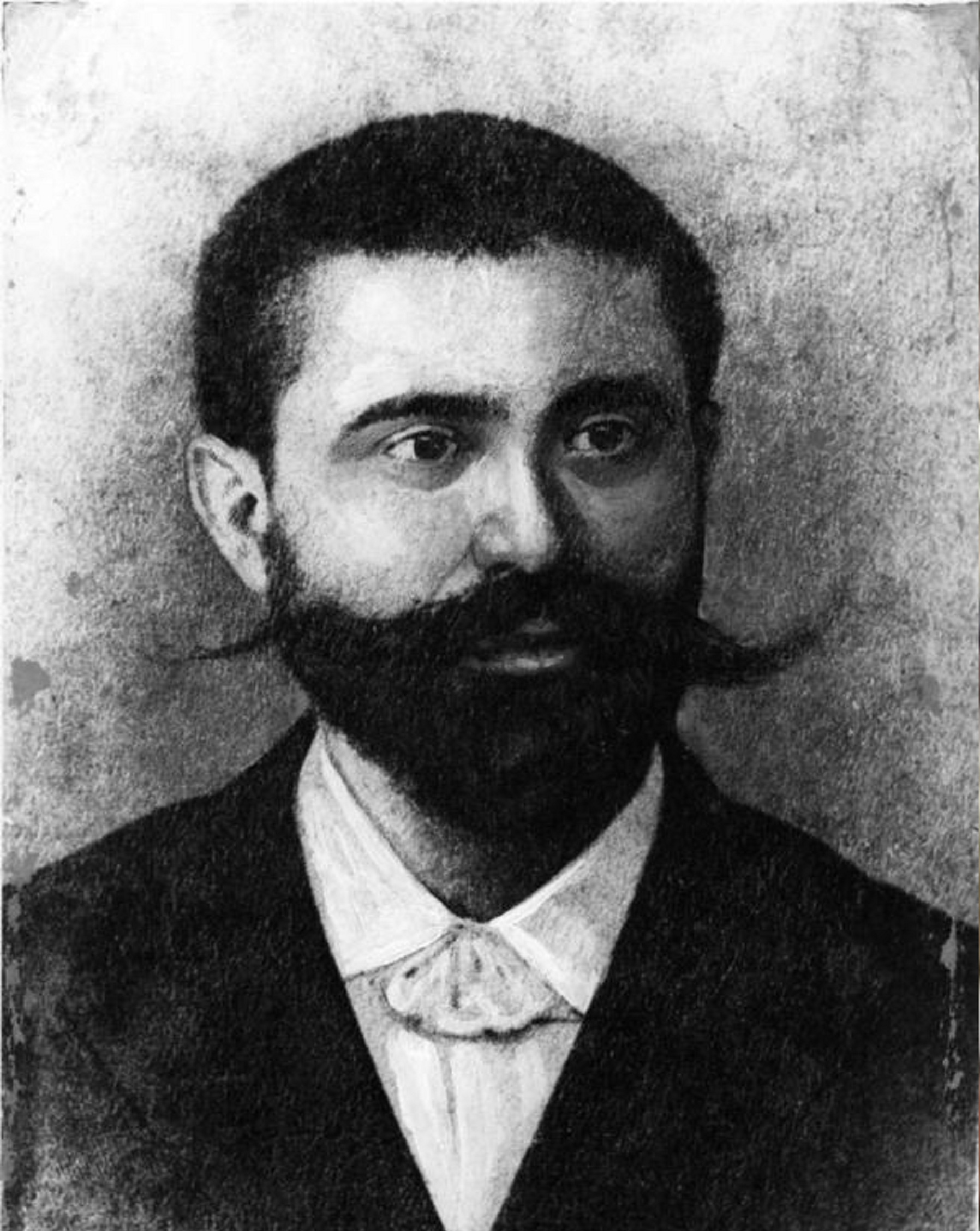
- A portrait of Georgios Pentzikis.
- Native name: Γεώργιος Πεντζίκης
- Born: c. mid 1800s Thessaloniki, Salonika Vilayet, Ottoman Empire (now Greece)
- Allegiance: Kingdom of Greece
- Branch: HMC
- Conflicts: Macedonian Struggle (POW)
- Awards: Silver Cross of the Order of the Redeemer
- Other work: Doctor; Member of the Philoptochos Brotherhood of Men of Thessaloniki

Georgios Pentzikis (Greek: Γεώργιος Πεντζίκης) was a Greek chieftain of the Macedonian Struggle.

== Biography ==
He was born in the mid-19th century in Thessaloniki and was a doctor.

In 1898 he joined the Philoptochos Brotherhood of Men of Thessaloniki, which was a Greek patriotic organization that was active since 1871 and acted against several Bulgarian actions in Thessaloniki.

In 1905 the Brotherhood with Athanasios Souliotis was placed in the "Executive" of the Hellenic Organization, who even took over the leadership and managed to become a major member of the Macedonian Committee in Thessaloniki. As the head of the executive branch, he collaborated with Athanasios Vogas, Ioannis Emiris, Theodoros Zlatanos, Athanasios Kallidopoulos, Georgios Divolis, Evangelos Doumas, Argyrios Zachos, Dimitrios Margaropoulos and others in operations within the city of Thessaloniki and the surroundings against specific Bulgarian targets until 1908, when the Young Turk Revolution led to the end of the Macedonian Struggle. During this period, he was in danger of being imprisoned by the Ottoman authorities after a strike against a Bulgarian target, but after actions of the organization for his acquittal he managed to get rid of the accusations and continue his actions.

For his contribution as leader and coordinator of the "Executive", Pentzikis was recognized as an Agent II Class and at the same time he was awarded the Silver Cross of the Order of the Redeemer.
