= Konstantinos Doumbiotis =

Greek revolutionary and military officer (c. 1793–1911)

Konstantinos Doumbiotis (Greek: Κωνσταντίνος Δουμπιώτης) was a Greek revolutionary and military officer (c. 1793–1911).

He was born around 1793 in Doumbia of Chalkidiki, the son of Theofilos Doumbiotis. He served the Ottoman administration of Chalkidiki as a subaşi in the Mademochoria. Along with his siblings Vasilikos, Stergios, Nikolaos, Polychronis, and the Kassandrine Anastasios Chymeftos, he participated in the Greek War of Independence in Chalkidiki as one of the lieutenants of Emmanouel Pappas. After the suppression of the Greek uprising in Chalkidiki in November 1821 he went to Naoussa, where he fought alongside Anastasios Karatasos. After the destruction of Naoussa he fled to Skopelos via Aspropotamos and Zagora.

The first written mention of his name is cited in a document from May 1822 from Skopelos.

Doumbiotis took part with Karatasos and other Macedonian chieftains in many battles in south and central Greece, like in Skiathos in 1823, in the Battle of Neokastron at Pylos in 1825, in the protection of Hydra (1824–25), in Trikeri in 1823 and 1827, in Atalanti in 1827, in Vrysakia in 1822, in Arachova in 1832 and in Thebes. During Greek civil wars of 1824–1825 he fought with Ioannis Kolettis' army in the Peloponnese. In March 1825 on Kolettis' proposal he was promoted to General officer. For some time, between 1826–28, according to accusations attributed to him, he acted as a pirate. He was imprisoned by Kapodistrias in Aegina in 1828–28. From 1822 until 1828 he resided in Glossa, Skopelos, where for some time he served as governor (politarches). His autocratic and peremptory behaviour led the local residents to request his dismissal in 1826.

After his release, in February 1829, he became a pentacosiarch in Dimitrios Karatasos' battalion and in November 1831 he was appointed as commander of the 14th Battalion. The same year he firstly followed Dimitrios Karatasos in the movement the latter organised against Augustinos Kapodistrias. However, after a while he rejoined the regular army. In January 1832 he was besieged by Petsavas in Davleia. He was arrested with Theodoros Kolokotronis for the supposed plot against the regency for King Otto of Greece in 1833; however, thanks to Kolettis' intervention, he was freed and not put on trial. After the establishment of the Royal Phalanx in 1836 he served as a second lieutenant in the second tetrarchy of Chalcis, with Kriezotis as captain. He settled permanently in Chalcis with his family in a house next to Saint Demetrius' church.

On 20 May 1845 he was promoted to lieutenant colonel in the Phalanx. He died in 1848 in Chalcis.

His contributions to the struggle for independence were recognised as he was made an officer of the fourth class. He was the only Chalcidian, together with Apostolos Vasileiou, to become pentacosiarchs in the regularization of the irregular forces in 1829. With his wife, Soultana, he had three daughters, two of whom were born after 1847. He also adopted a boy, Miltiadis, who joined the military and took part in the Greco-Turkish War of 1897. He died in 1911. Miltiadis' son was the medical doctor Dimitrios Doumbiotis (1874–1917), employee of the Greek consulate in Bitola, and responsible for the area of Kastoria during the Macedonian Struggle in 1908. His son was Kosmas-Alexandros-Miltiadis, diplomatic officer (1917–1991).
