= Stergios Vlachveis =

Greek chieftain of the Macedonian Struggle

Kapetan (Chieftain) Stergios Vlachveis
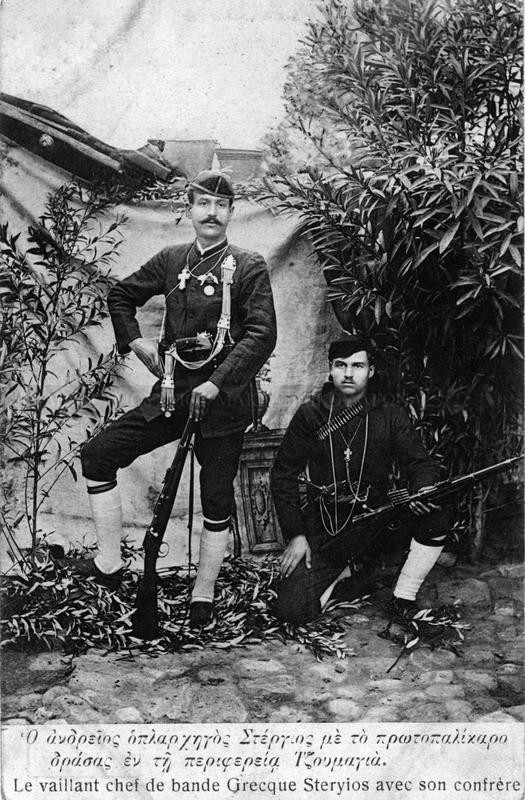
- Stergios Vlachveis with a fellow fighter c. 1908
- Native name: Στέργιος Βλάχβεης
- Born: c. 1880; Kato Tzoumagia, Salonika Vilayet, Ottoman Empire (now Irakleia, Greece)
- Died: 11 December 1948 Kingdom of Greece
- Allegiance: Kingdom of Greece
- Branch: HMC; Hellenic Army
- Conflicts: Macedonian Struggle; Balkan Wars: First Balkan War; Second Balkan War
- Awards: Commemorative Medal for the Macedonian Struggle
- Other work: Mayor of Tzoumagia

Stergios Vlachveis (Greek: Στέργιος Βλάχβεης) was a significant Greek chieftain of the Macedonian Struggle.

== Biography ==
Vlachveis was born in about 1880 in Kato Tzoumagia (now Irakleia) of Serres. He started his armed actions very early. Initially, he was placed under the general instructions of Doukas Gaitatzis. He then collaborated with the group of the chieftain Papapaschalis from Sakavtsia (now Livadohori). After the death of the chieftain Athanasios Hatzipantazis in 1906, he got the general leadership of the Greek armed groups of the regions of Serres, Visaltia, Irakleia, Ano Poroia, Belasica, Sintiki, Petrich and Melnik.

He eliminated the pro-Romanian propaganda in the region of Eastern Macedonia which had the purpose of attracting Greek and Aromanian populations. He also managed to face the armed actions of the Bulgarian komitadjis Sadanski, Sitso Acev, Donzio, Sarafov, Voivode Taka, Dina Arabatzi and Manushov, who were active in the north Serres region. Consequently, the inhabitants of many villages returned their allegiance to the Patriarchate. Together with chieftain Athanasios Kipouros, also from Kato Tzomagia, they executed the Bulgarian Digo, who had betrayed the Greek chieftain Dimitrios Gogolakis to the Turks, in September 1907. Due to the persecution of him and his group by the Ottoman authorities, he was forced to flee to Athens in the autumn of 1907. He met with brothers Theocharis and Mavroudis Gerogiannis, locals of Lerigovo (now Arnaia) of Chalkidiki who were managers of the Central Macedonian Society of Athens.

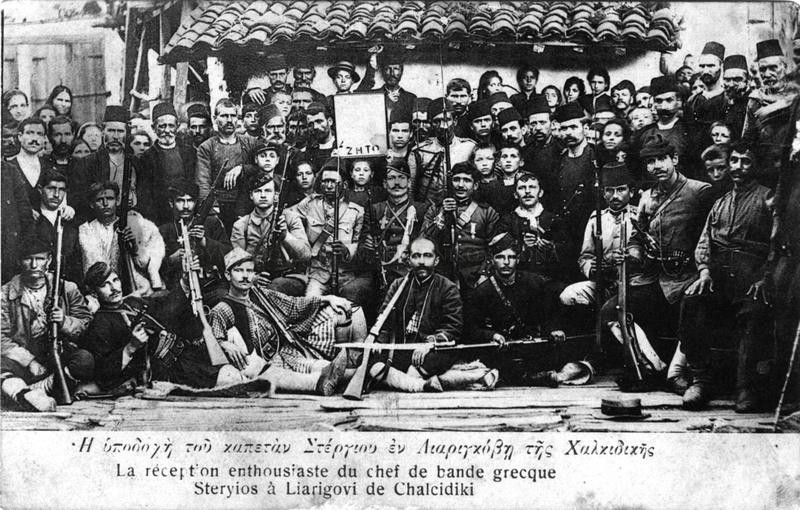
Reception of Vlachveis' group in Lerigovo (Arnaia).

With the help of the Society, he organized a new armed group and returned to Macedonia and specifically to Chalkidiki with the ultimate goal of recovering the Serres region. He remained for some time in the areas of Chalkidiki, Langadas and Vertiskos, despite the appeals of the Director of the National Center of Serres, Dimosthenis Florias, to go to his hometown, where the situation was critical. Later he returned to the northern Serres region, where he again took action with his group against the komitadjis. In 1908 he was active in the areas of Nigrita and Belasica. On July 22, 1908, he went to Serres, during the general amnesty granted by the Young Turks.

Later, he participated in the First Balkan War, acting mostly in Nigrita. After the liberation of his home town, Irakleia, he served for many years as a mayor.

He died on 11 December 1948, at the age of 67 or 68.

== Sources ==
- John S. Koliopoulos (editor), Αφανείς, γηγενείς Μακεδονομάχοι, Εταιρεία Μακεδονικών Σπουδών, University Studio Press, Thessaloniki, 2008, p. 143
- Hellenic Army General Staff, Army History Directorate, Ο Μακεδονικός Αγών και τα εις Θράκην γεγονότα, Athens 1979, p. 148, 297, 301
