= Melissochori, Thessaloniki =

Μελισσοχώρι Μελισσοχώρι
- Community
- Location within Greece
- Coordinates: 40°46.1′N 22°55.7′E
- Country: Greece
- Administrative region: Central Macedonia
- Regional unit: Thessaloniki
- Municipality: Oraiokastro
- Municipal unit: Mygdonia

Area
  - Community: 37.561 km^{2} (14.502 sq mi)
- Elevation: 220 m (720 ft)

Population (2021)
  - Community: 3,437
  - Density: 91.50/km^{2} (237.0/sq mi)
- Time zone: UTC+2 (EET)
  - Summer (DST): UTC+3 (EEST)
- Postal code: 570 18
- Area code: +30-2394
- Vehicle registration: NA to NX

Melissochori (Greek: Μελισσοχώρι), known before 1926 as Baldzha (Greek: Μπάλτζα), is a village and a community of the Oraiokastro municipality. Before the 2011 local government reform it was part of the municipality of Mygdonia, of which it was a municipal district. The 2021 census recorded 3,437 inhabitants in the village. The community of Melissochori covers an area of 37.561 km^{2}.

== See also ==
- List of settlements in the Thessaloniki regional unit
