= Michael Sionidis =

Kapetan (Chieftain) Michael Sionidis
- Μιχαήλ Σιωνίδης
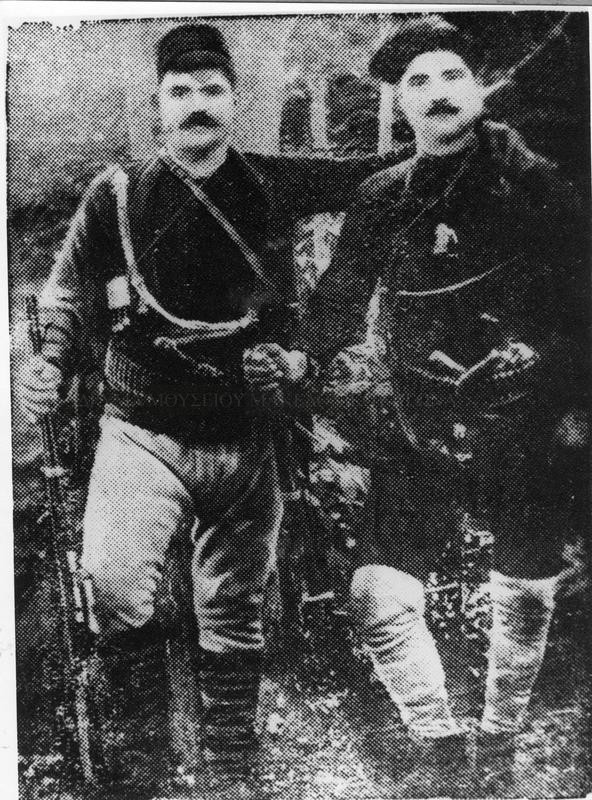
- Michael Sionidis and his cousin, Dionysius Sionidis during the Macedonian Struggle. (Note: "The pair are dressed in pants of woolen material, waistcoats and wear the caps of makedonomachoi. In addition they wear homespun stockings. The figure at left wears tsarouhia without pompons, and the right wears service boots. The figure at left wears a square silver amulet with a skull and crossbones suspended over his chest. They each carry a Fusil Gras mle 1874. They wear their cartridges in their belts. The left wears a double-edge kama knife in his belt while the right has a knife and a Gasser M1870 Montenegrin Pattern revolver.")
- Born: c. 1870; Grčište, Salonika Vilayet, Ottoman Empire (now Republic of North Macedonia).
- Died: c. 1935; Evzonoi, Kingdom of Greece
- Military career
- Allegiance: Kingdom of Greece
- Branch: HMC; Hellenic Army
- Unit: III Army Corps
- Conflicts: Macedonian Struggle; Balkan Wars: First Balkan War; Second Balkan War; Battle of Kilkis-Lachanas; World War I: Macedonian front; Battle of Skra-di-Legen
- Awards: Gold Cross of Valour; War Cross (1917 variant); Commemorative Medal of the Macedonian Struggle

Michael Sionidis (Greek: Μιχαήλ Σιωνίδης or Μιχάλης Σιωνίδης, Mihális Sionídis; c. 1870–1935) was a Greek leader of makedonomachoi in the Macedonian Struggle.

== Early life ==
Michael Sionidis was born in the village of Grčište, Ottoman Empire (near Bogdanci in the present-day North Macedonia) in about 1870.

== Military career ==
At the outbreak of the Macedonian Struggle in 1904, Sionidis fought against the pro-Bulgarian komitadjis, (Note: "Committee members", i.e. members of cheta bands sympathising with the Internal Macedonian Revolutionary Organization) acting in an area covering Grčište, Gevgelija and Doirani. Sionidis first fought under Georgios Zira, (Note: Γεώργιος Ζήρα) then under Emmanuel Katsigaris, (Note: Εμμανουήλ Κατσίγαρης) before he finally founded his own militia.

In the autumn of 1904, Bulgarian komitadjis killed several of Grčište's Greek inhabitants, including the teacher Catherine Hadjigeorgiou, who was Michael's cousin, the teacher Constantine Sionidis, Andronikis' daughter, and five other Greeks. In retaliation, Sionidis led his militia in an attack on the village of Marvinci, where the komitadjis were hiding. After getting injured, he went to Gevgelija to recuperate (January 1905).

After the First Balkan War, Grčište came under Serbian control, and Sionidis moved to the village of Matsikovo (modern Evzonoi), which was at the time on the Greco-Serbian border. During the Balkan Wars, King Constantine I of Greece established his headquarters in his house. Sionidis participated in the Battle of Kilkis-Lahanas, where he was injured. Sionidis also participated in the Battle of Skra-di-Legen during World War I, and worked as a secret agent of the Third Army Corps behind enemy lines, in the area of Strumica.

== Later years ==
Following the end of World War I, Sionidis, as president of Matsikovo community, retrieved the remains of nine evzones whom the Bulgarians had killed during the Second Balkan War, and buried them in his village. In 1927, the Epitropi Metonomasias (Note: "Committee for Name Change", see Geographical name changes in Greece) renamed Matsikovo to Evzonoi in their honour. Michael Sionidis died in 1935.

For his services, he was awarded the Golden Cross of Valour, Greece's highest bravery award, along with the War Cross and the Commemorative Medal of the Macedonian Struggle.
