= Zisis Vrakas =

Greek chieftain

Kapetan (Chieftain) Zisis Vrakas
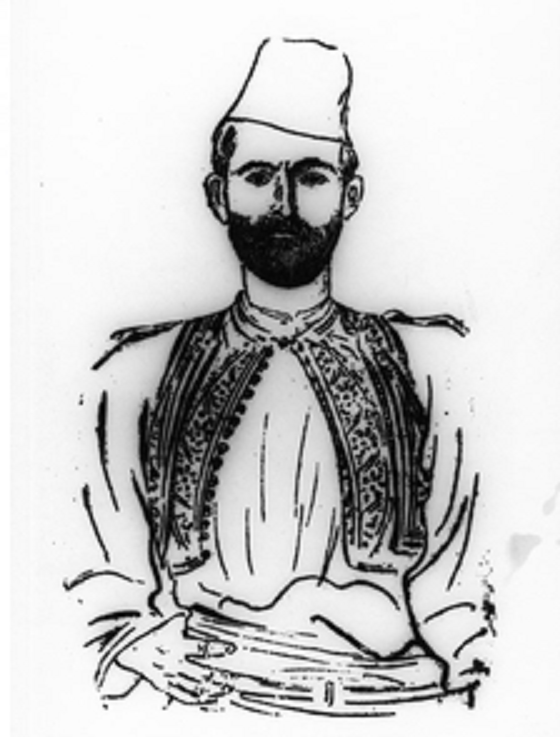
- A depiction of Vrakas during his rebel years.
- Native name: Ζήσης Βράκας
- Born: c. 1857; Perivoli, Janina Vilayet, Ottoman Empire (now Greece)
- Allegiance: Kingdom of Greece
- Service / branch: HMC
- Battles / wars: 1896–1897 Greek Macedonian rebellion Macedonian Struggle

Zisis Vrakas (Greek: Ζήσης Βράκας; 1857 in Perivoli, Grevena – ?) was an important Greek chieftain of the Macedonian Struggle.

He acted in the region of Pindus and Western Macedonia. Due to his persecution by the Ottoman authorities he was forced to flee to Larissa. Subsequently, as the leader of an armed group he participated in the 1896–1897 Greek Macedonian rebellion against several Ottoman targets.

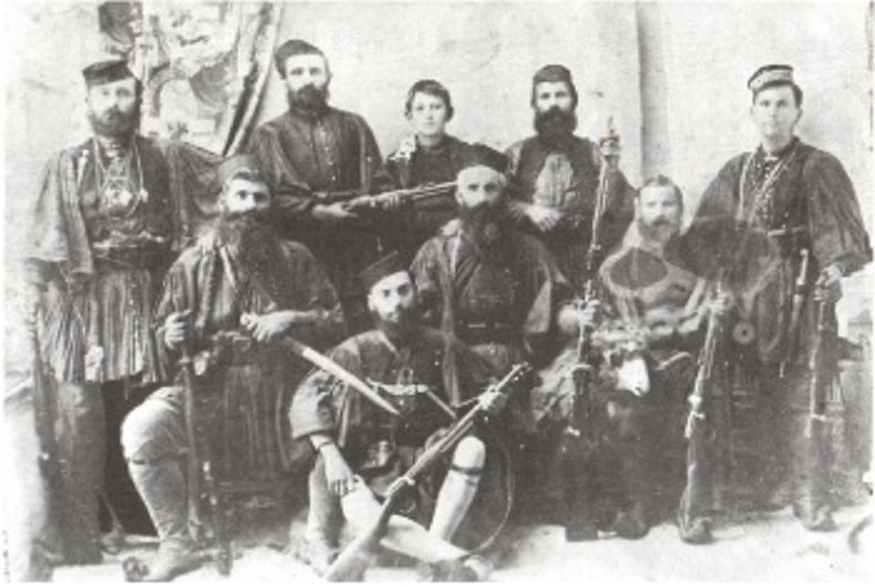
Zisis Vrakas and his armed group during the Macedonian Struggle.

During the Macedonian Struggle, he acted with his group in the areas of Grevena, Voio and Kastanochoria against the Ottoman army detachments and Bulgarian armed groups, as well as for the pro-Romanian groups attempting to liberate the Aromanian populations from Greek oppression.
