= Lazos Dogiamas =

- Λάζος Δογιάμας; Лазар Доямов
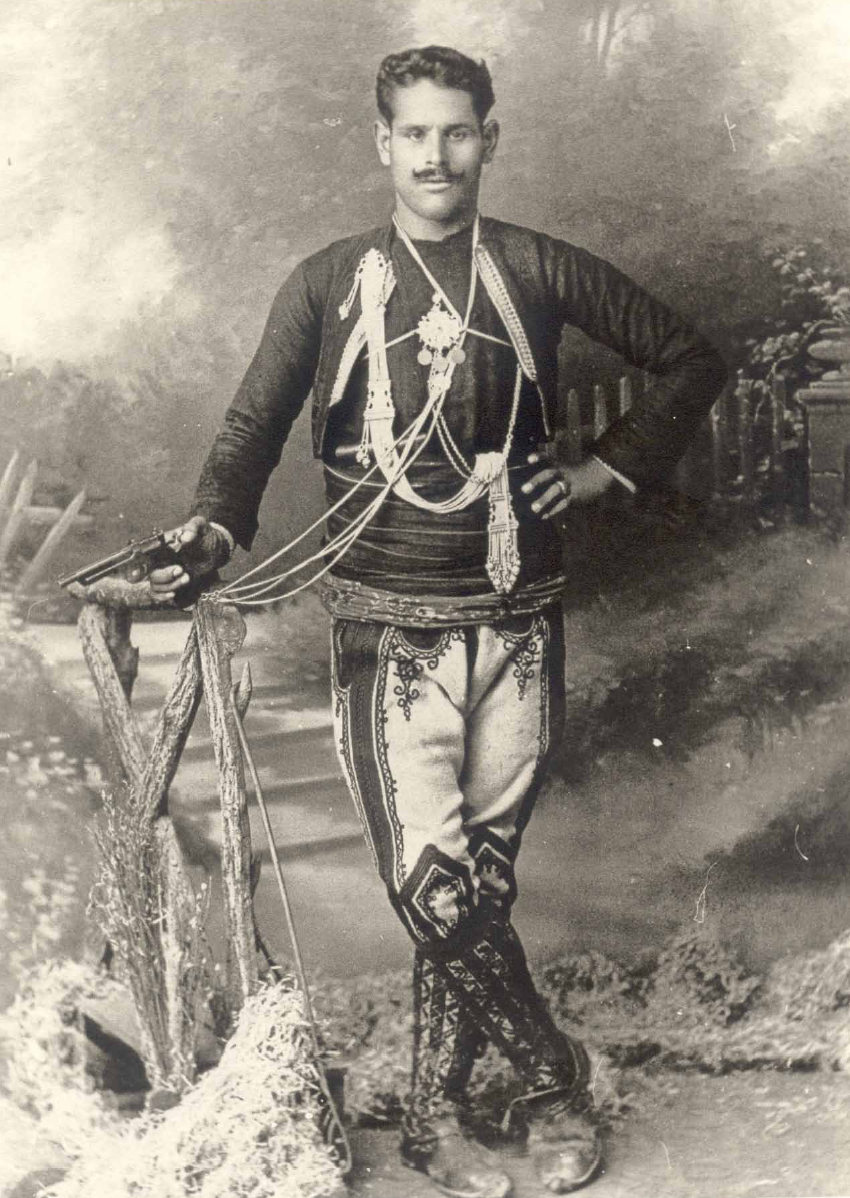
- Lazos Dogiamas c. 1908-1912
- Born: 1878; Barovitsa, Salonika Vilayet, Ottoman Empire (now Kastaneri, Greece)
- Died: 24 August 1912 (aged 33–34); Barovitsa, Salonika Vilayet, Ottoman Empire (now Kastaneri, Greece)
- Burial place: Graveyard of the Church of Agia Paraskevi in Kastaneri
- Spouse: Aikaterini
- Relatives: Traianos Dogiamas (brother); Demetrios Dogiamas (brother); Georgios Dogiamas (brother); Christos Dogiamas (cousin)
- Military career
- Allegiance: IMRO (1903-1905); Kingdom of Greece
- Branch: HMC
- Service years: 1903-1912
- Nicknames: Kapetan Barovitsalis; Καπετάν Μπαροβίτσαλης
- Conflicts: Macedonian Struggle †; Ilinden Uprising; Battle of Kandasti

Lazaros or Lazos Dogiamas (Greek: Λάζαρος/Λάζος Δογιάμας) was a Greek chieftain of the Macedonian Struggle. He went by the nom de guerre Kapetan Barovitsalis (Καπετάν Μπαροβίτσαλης).

== Early life ==
Lazos Dogiamas was born in the village of Barovitsa (now Kastaneri, Greece) in 1878 to Christos and Angeliki Dogiama. He could speak both Greek and Bulgarian. He came from the old and well known family of Dogiamas which was involved in agriculture and animal breeding. He had three brothers, Traianos, Demetrios, and Georgios, and a sister Maria. He and his three brothers would all become Makedonomachoi.

== IMRO and the Ilinden Uprising ==
Lazos Dogiamas joined the IMRO in the latter half of 1903, entering the armed band of his elder brother Traianos, who had joined sometime prior for security purposes. He joined with the desire to fight the Ottomans and served in the band of Apostol Petkov. Lazos and his brothers formed their own band in 1902 and in 1903 participated in the Ilinden Uprising. In early 1904, he and his brother learned the true intentions of the IMRO towards to the Greek population and in an act of reprisal, killed three Komitadjis and two IMRO Agents. Their band began to act autonomously and in an attempt at blackmail, the Bulgarians began commit the murders of their relatives.

In early 1905, the brothers defected to serve the Hellenic Macedonian Committee.

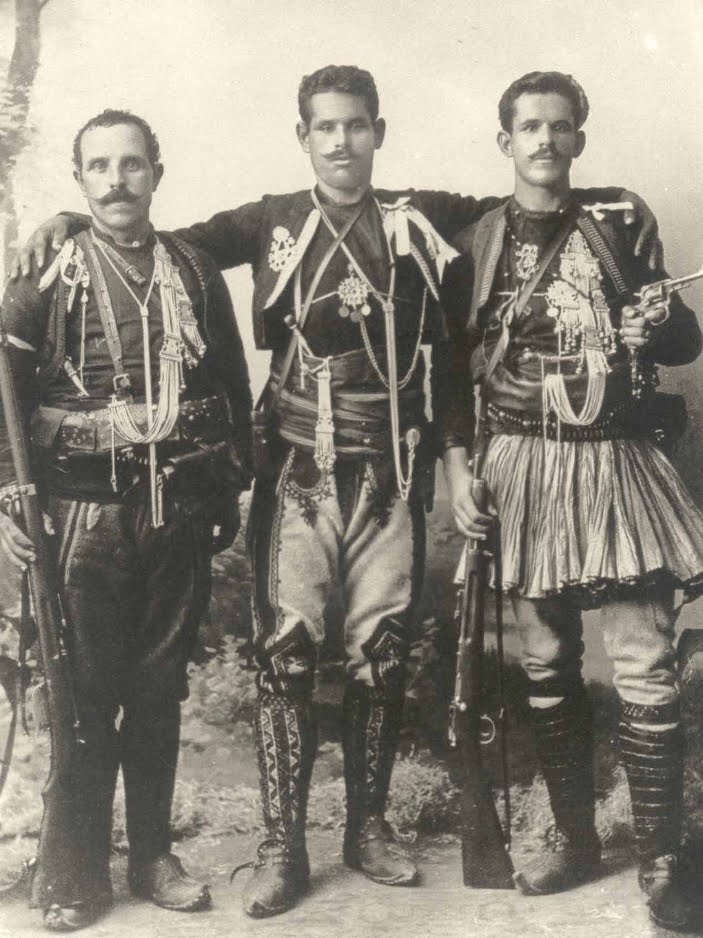
Lazos and his brothers Demetrios and Georgios after the Young Turk Revolution.

== HMC and the Macedonian Struggle ==
Lazos Dogiamas and his brothers collectively entered the service of the Hellenic Macedonian Committee in 1905. They were placed under command of M. Moraitis (Kapetan Kodrou) and thus became Makedonomachoi. All three of his brothers took part in the Battle of Kandasti against the Ottoman Army where the band of Apostol Petkov was also involved. The band of Kapetan Kodrou was hit hard and fractured, leaving Lazos to reorganize and resume the fight. He struck back and pursued Apostol Petkov and his band. They would clash again days later, with only Apostol and two other Komitadjis escaping.

In 1906, Lazos Dogiamas and his band, in collaboration with his brothers, operated in the areas around Yenice, Karadjova, and Gevgeli and successfully rivalled the efforts of the Komitadjis. In July of that year, he worked with the band of Christos Dellios of Gevgeli in order to locate and kill Apostol Petkov which resulted in failure. However, they were able to assassinate the Turkish Aga Kiose Emin, who had a good relationship with the IMRO. The killing of the Aga led to the arrest of Traianos Dogiamas by Ottoman authorities. Traianos was surrendered to the Bulgarian government and was promptly transferred to Sofia as he was still a formal member of the IMRO. Lazos followed him and assisted in a failed escape attempt which resulted in Traianos' death.

Lazos Dogiamas returned to Macedonia in early 1907 and formed a new armed band of 15 men. However, he had aroused the suspicion of the HMC after his journey to Sofia and had to regain their trust. He was able to obtain recommendations from various prefects and was once again allowed to enter service. He went on to work with Gonos Yiotas around the Giannitsa Lake to combat the Bulgarian Komitadjis and Romanian Guerillas. Lazos and Gonos went from village to village to raise the morale of the Greek Patriarchists. At times, they had to disguise themselves as ragged villagers to evade Ottoman authorities.

In 1908, Lazos Dogiamas continued his operations and engaged in many skirmishes against the Ottomans, Bulgarians, and Romanians.

== After the Young Turk Revolution ==
Lazos Dogiamas went to Athens following the Young Turk Revolution. However, after some time, it became obvious that the new administration of the Young Turks was not keeping many of its promises and persecution against the Greeks of Macedonia resumed. Additionally, the IMRO returned and terrorized the Greek population. Many of the Chieftains, Lazos included, worried for their families that remained in Macedonia.

In the summer of 1910, Lazos organized a group of men and re-entered Macedonia to resume his operations. He once again cooperated with Gonos Yiotas as well as Georgios Karaiskakis.

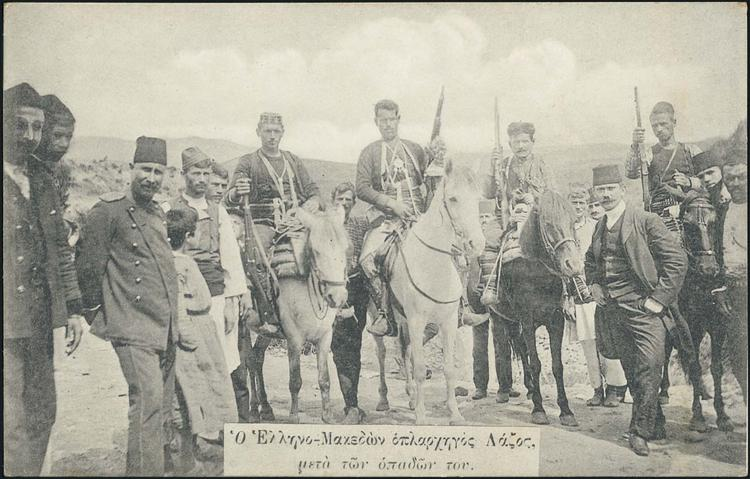
Lazos Dogiamas with others (centre on horse).

Following a betrayal in February 1911, a fierce battle commenced against the Ottoman Army by the lake of Giannitsa which resulted in the death of Gonos Yiotas. Lazos Dogiamas was left to assume leadership of their band. Days later he was once again forced to take refuge in Athens to avoid Ottoman persecution. He returned a few months later with a new band following reports of renewed violence against Greeks. He became wanted by Ottoman authorities, declaring him as dangerous.

During the summer of 1912, Lazos Dogiamas kidnapped the son of a rich Bulgarian from Igumencho by the name of Gotsos. He demanded a ransom, but a Komitadji from Lazos' village convinced him to release the son without ransom.

== Death ==
Lazos Dogiamas was invited by the IMRO to discuss potential cooperation against the Ottomans. Various members from each side attended the meeting. Once the meeting concluded, a signal was given and the Bulgarians axed Lazos and two other Greeks to death.

His body was retrieved by his mother and was transported to the church of Agia Paraskevi in his village, where he was later buried in its cemetery.

== Legacy ==
A bust of Lazos was erected in Goumenissa in 1967 and was unveiled by his widow, Aikaterini.

== Gallery ==
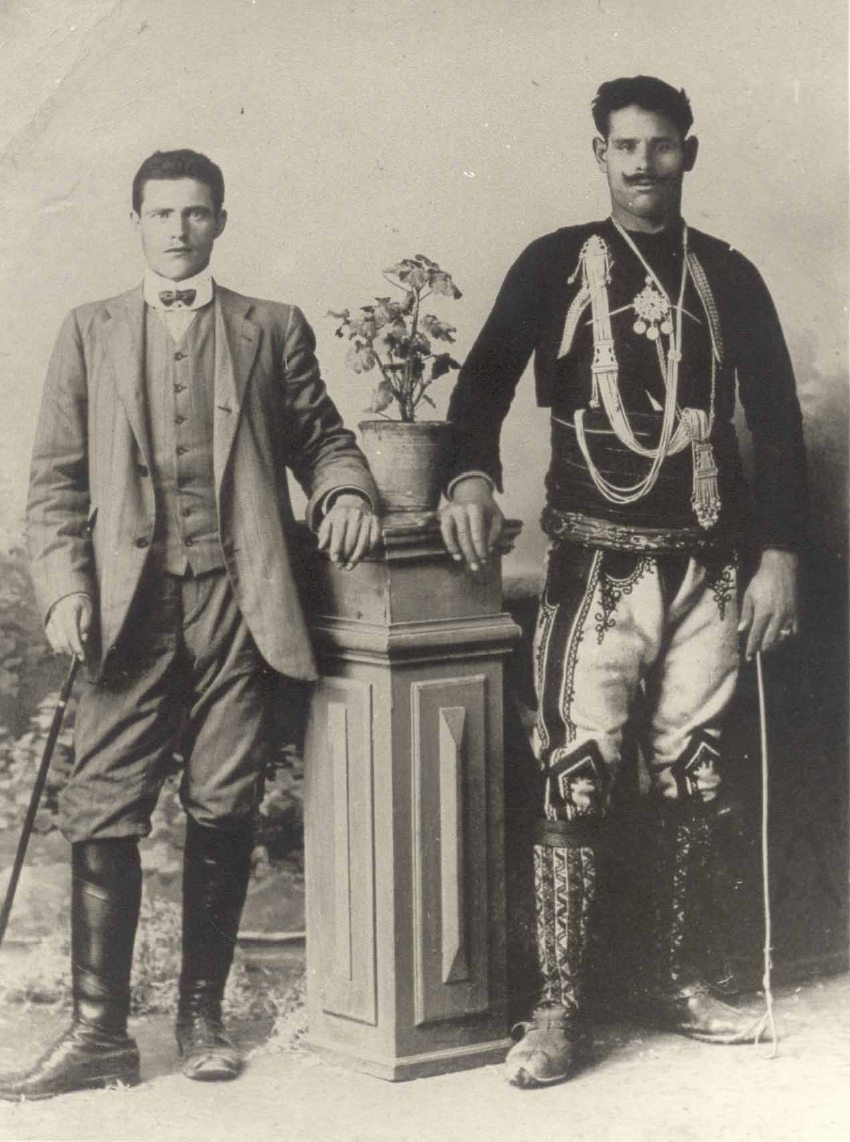
Ioannis Ramnalis and Lazos Dogiamas c. 1905-1908

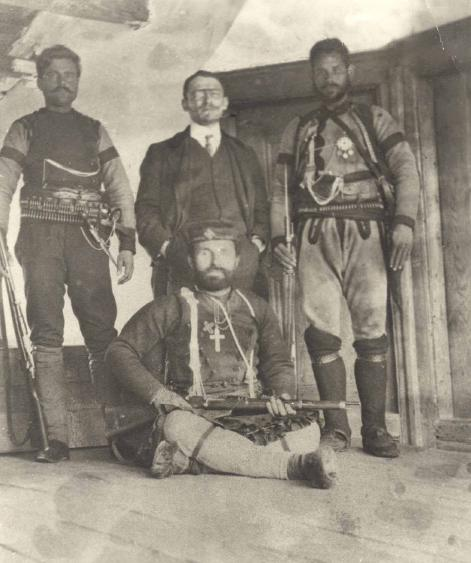
Standing: Gonos Yiotas, Alexandros Mazarakis, Lazos Dogiamas. Seated: Apostolis Matopoulos.

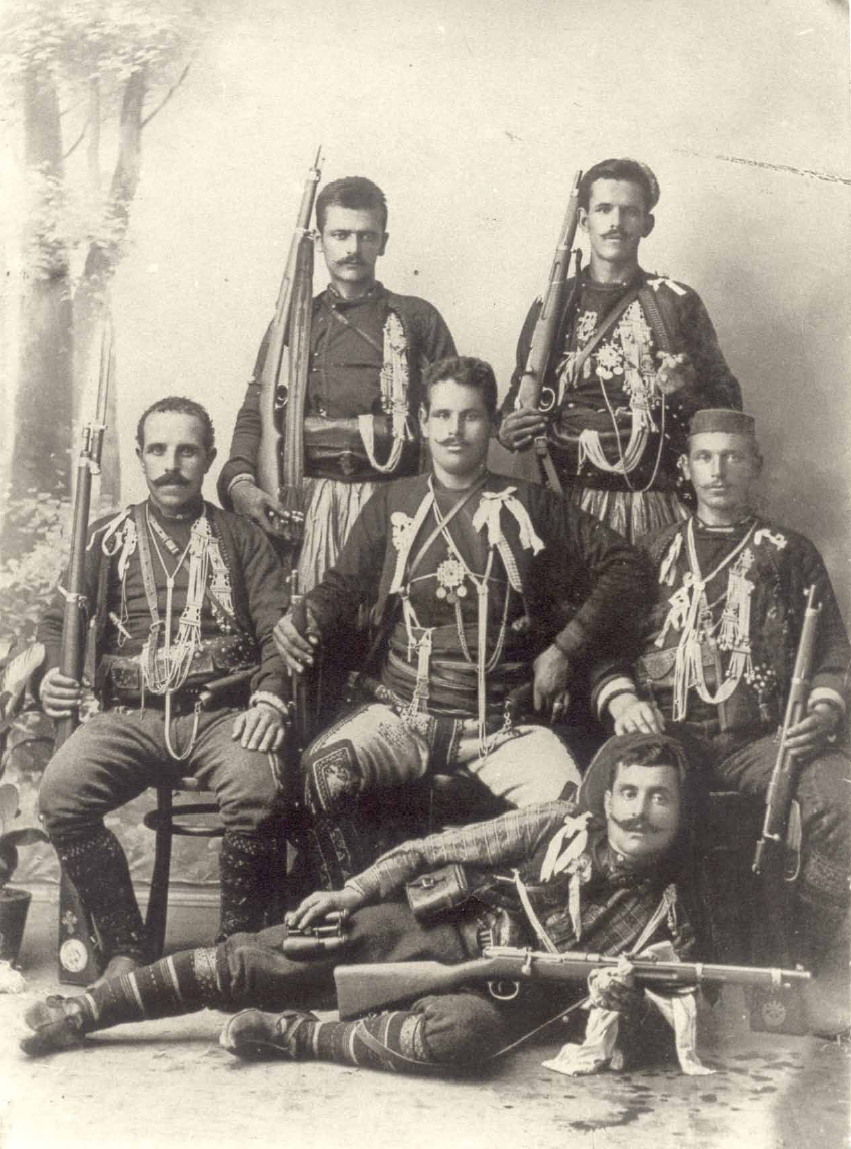
Lazos Dogiamas with his brothers and others.

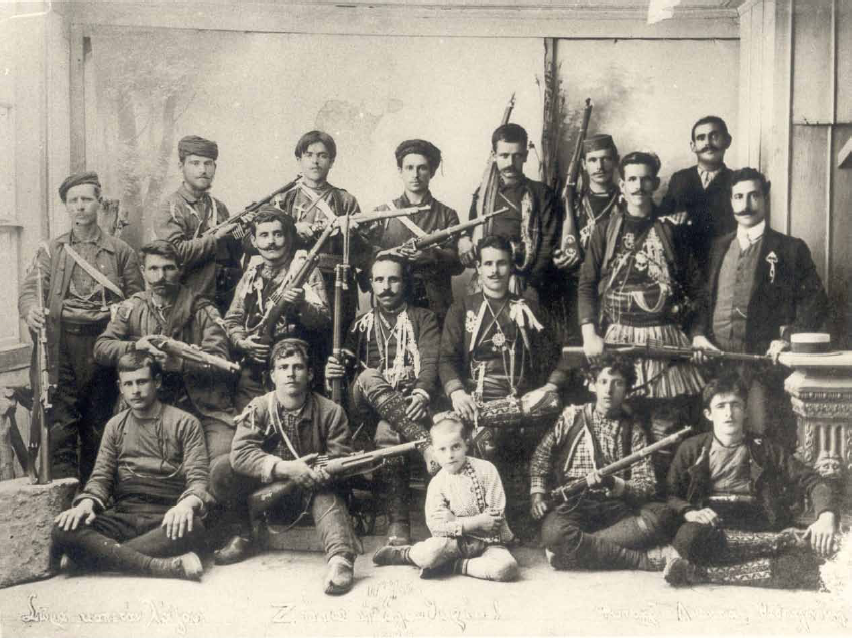
Lazos Dogiamas and his armed band.

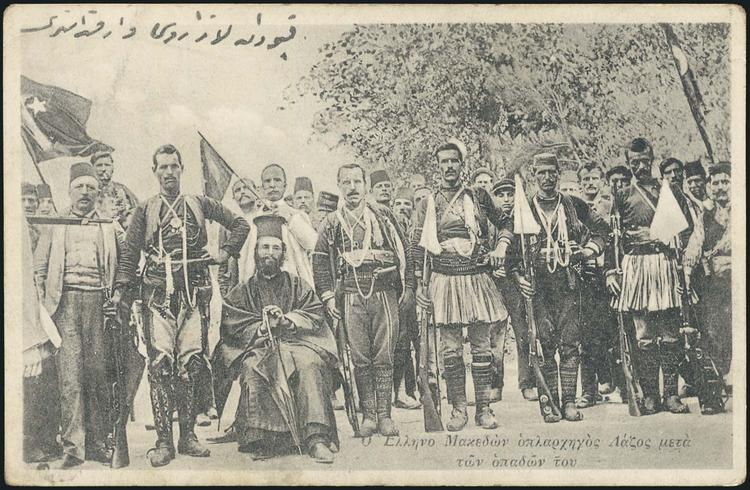
Lazos Dogiamas and his armed band after the Young Turk Revolution.

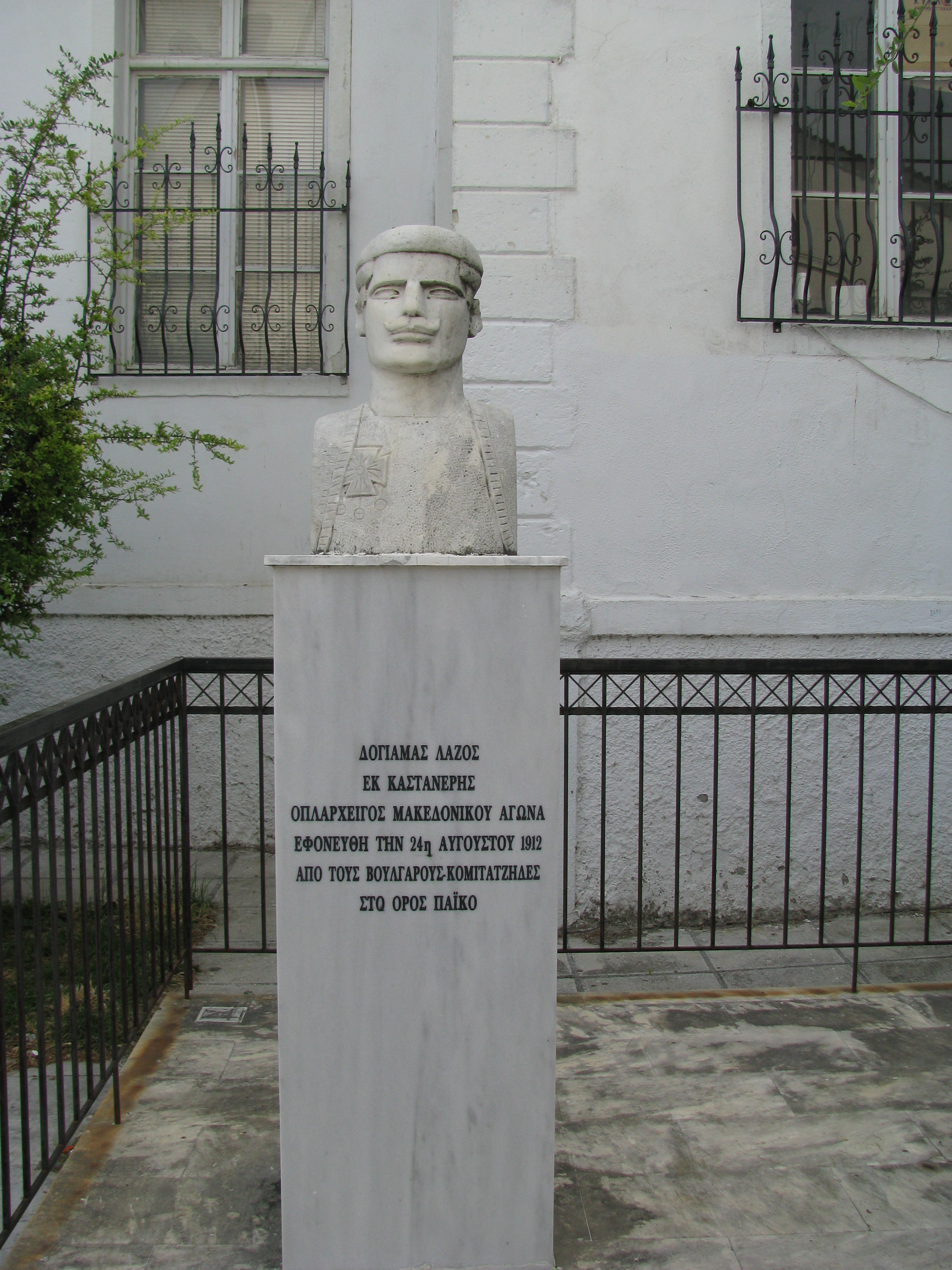
The bust of Lazos Dogiamas in Goumenissa.
