= Georgios Seridis =

Greek chieftain of the Macedonian Struggle

Kapetan (Chieftain) Georgios Seridis
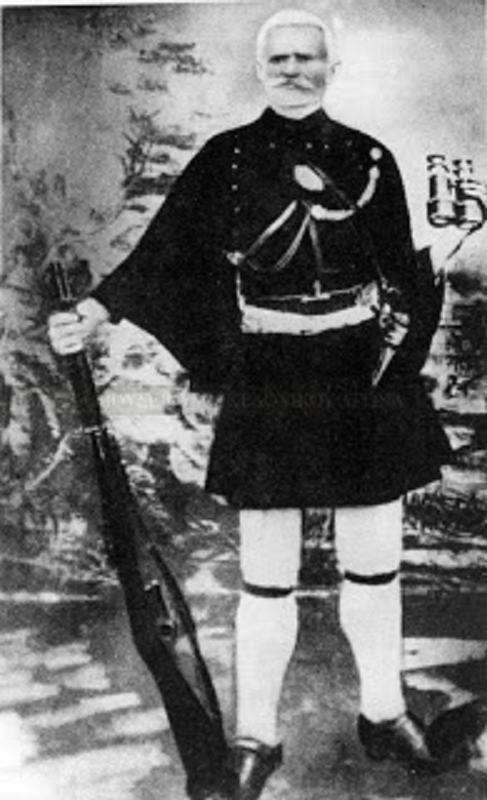
- Seridis during the Macedonian Struggle.
- Native name: Γεώργιος Σερίδης
- Nickname: Kapetan Spanos (Καπετάν Σπάνος)
- Born: c. 1850s Flampouro, Monastir Vilayet, Ottoman Empire (now Greece)
- Died: c. 1905 Goumenissa, Salonika Vilayet, Ottoman Empire (now Greece)
- Allegiance: Kingdom of Greece
- Branch: HMC
- Conflicts: 1896-1897 Greek Macedonian rebellion Macedonian Struggle †

Georgios Seridis (Greek: Γεώργιος Σερίδης), elsewhere known under the nom de guerre Kapetan Spanos, was a Greek chieftain of the Macedonian Struggle.

== Biography ==
Seridis was born in the 1850s or 60s in Flampouro, Florina. He was a wood merchant, working in Central and West Macedonia. He started his armed actions early, even before the arrival of the officers from the Greek state, against the Bulgarian komitadjis of Giannitsa and Goumenissa.

In 1904 he met with Konstantinos Mazarakis-Ainian, who helped him form an eighty-member body of Greek Macedonians. Mazarakis entrusted him with the leadership of the body (despite his advanced age), as he was experienced in wars and respected by the soldiers. At the beginning of 1905, his body acted in the regions of Pelagonia and Monastiri (now Bitola), and in the February of that year he succeeded in beating a komitadji group near Kruševo. However, his main area of action remained Goumenissa and Mount Paiko, where he restricted the activity of the Bulgarian armed groups, including Apostol Petkov's. His presence and successful operations resulted in raising the morale of the Greeks in the region.

Captain Spanos and his group were arrested by an Ottoman army detachment near Goumenissa, resulting in the end of his actions.

== Sources ==
- "Αφανείς, Γηγενείς Μακεδονομάχοι", editor: John S. Koliopoulos, Εταιρεία Μακεδονικών Σπουδών, University Studio Press, Athens 2008
- Αρχείο Διεύθυνσης Εφέδρων Πολεμιστών, Αγωνιστών, Θυμάτων, Αναπήρων, Αρχείο Μακεδονικού Αγώνα, φ. Σ-23
- Γ. Πετσίβα (diligence), Ioannis Karavitis, "Ο Μακεδονικός Αγών", Athens 1994, volume Α΄, p. 91
