= Christos Dogiamas =

Slavophone Greek chieftain in the Macedonian Struggle

- Χρήστος Δογιάμας
- Born: c. 1880; Barovitsa, Salonika Vilayet, Ottoman Empire (now Kastaneri, Greece)
- Died: c. 1916
- Relatives: Traianos Dogiamas (cousin); Lazos Dogiamas (cousin); Demetrios Dogiamas (cousin); Georgios Dogiamas (cousin)
- Military career
- Allegiance: Kingdom of Greece
- Nickname: Kapetan Itsos (Καπετάν Ίτσος)
- Conflicts: Macedonian Struggle; World War I †

Christos Dogiamas (Greek: Χρήστος Δογιάμας) was a Greek chieftain in the Macedonian Struggle. He is also known by the nom de guerre Kapetan Itsos (καπετάν Ίτσος).

== Biography ==
Dogiamas was born in 1880 in Barovitsa (now Kastaneri) of Paionia, Kilkis. He and his brothers were bilingual in Greek and Bulgarian.

At a young age, Dogiamas joined the Macedonian Struggle with his cousins, Traianos, Lazaros, Dimitrios, and Georgios Dogiamas. He became a co-leader of the Lazaros armed group and acted until 1907, mainly at Giannitsa Lake. Until the end of the Macedonian Struggle, Dogiamas was active in the regions of Paionia, Paiko, Almopia, and Gevgeli, confronting Bulgarian komitadjis and Ottoman soldiers as the leader of his own armed group.

After the liberation of Macedonia and Greece's entry into World War I, Dogiamas set up an armed group with his cousin, chieftain Georgios Domiagias, to confront Bulgarian komitadjis, who had re-entered Macedonia. In 1916, their armed group battled a group of Bulgarian komitadjis. Christos Dogiamas and his cousin's brother-in-law, Georgios Kehagias, died after eliminating two komitadji armed groups.

== Sources ==
- Οι Μακεδονομάχοι Αδελφοί Δογιάμα, Κωνσταντίνος Δογιάμας, publications University Studio Press, Εταιρεία Μακεδονικών Σπουδών, σσ. 6, 16
- "Αφανείς, Γηγενείς Μακεδονομάχοι", επιστημονική επιμέλεια: Ιωάννης Σ. Κολιόπουλος, Εταιρεία Μακεδονικών Σπουδών, publications University Studio Press, 2008, p. 94
- Βλαχόφωνοι Έλληνες, από το βιβλίο του Γεώργιου Μόδη: Ο Μακεδονικός Αγών και η νεώτερη μακεδονική ιστορία, εκδ. Β’ Εταιρείας Μακεδονικών Σπουδών, Θεσσαλονίκη 2007
