= Stergios Daoutis =

Greek military leader

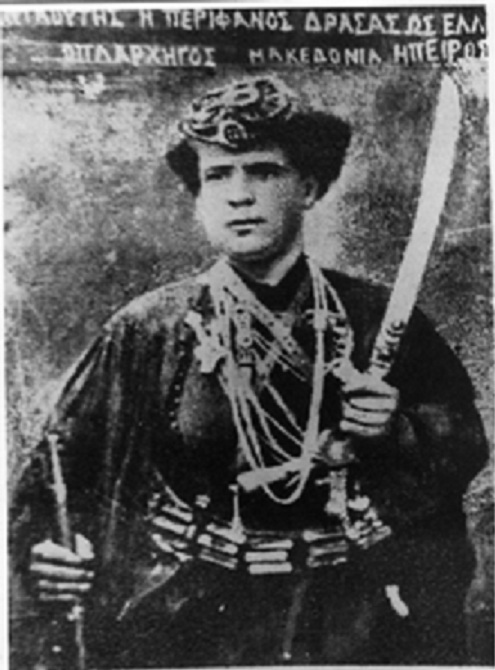
- Stergios Daoutis during the Macedonian Struggle
- Native name: Στέργιος Νταούτης
- Nicknames: Kapetan Perifanos; Καπετάν Περήφανος
- Born: c. late 1800s Ano Seli, Salonika Vilayet, Ottoman Empire (now Greece)
- Died: 21 April 1973 Veria, Kingdom of Greece
- Buried: Imathia, Greece
- Allegiance: Kingdom of Greece; Aut. Rep. Northern Epirus
- Branch: Hellenic Army
- Service years: 1907–1914
- Conflicts: Macedonian Struggle; Balkan Wars; First Balkan War; Liberation of Thessaloniki; Second Balkan War; Battle of Kilkis-Lachanas; North Epirote Struggle

Stergios Daoutis (Greek: Στέργιος Νταούτης) also known as Kapetan Perifanos (Καπετάν Περήφανος) was a significant Greek military leader of the Macedonian Struggle and of the Balkan Wars.

== Biography ==
Daoutis was born in the late 19th century in Ano Seli of Imathia, Macedonia. In 1907, he set up his own armed group and acted in the area of the Giannitsa Lake against the Bulgarian komitadjis. There, he first cooperated with Ch. Pradounas, then with G. Fragakos and the chieftain Georgios Gonos Yiotas in common operations against Bulgarian armed groups and Ottoman army detachments.

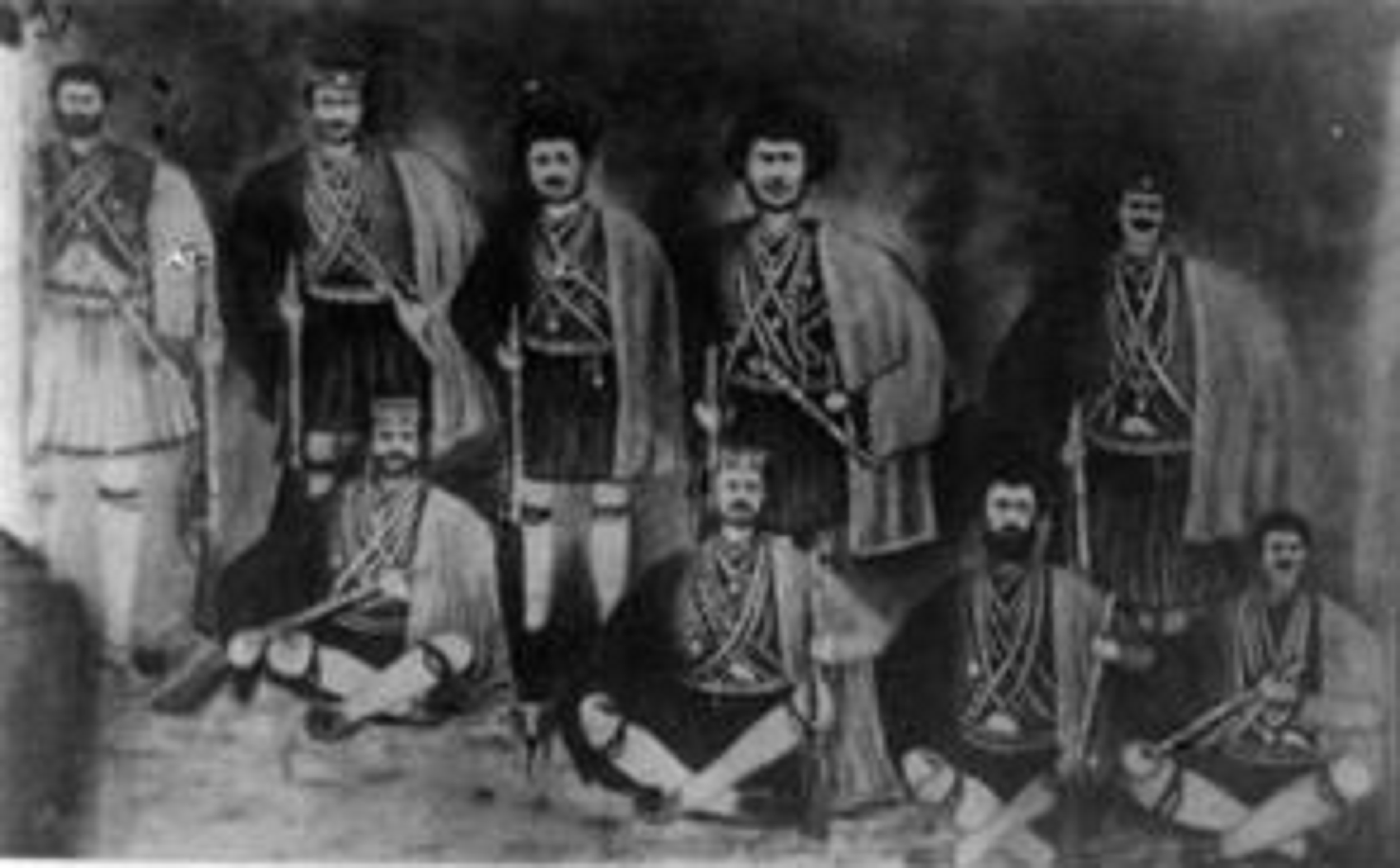
The band of Stergios Daoutis during the Macedonian Struggle.

During the First Balkan War he participated as a volunteer with his men, working with officers Konstantinos Mazarakis-Ainian, V. Stavropoulos and P. Papatzaneteas, in numerous operations and battles for the Hellenic Army. The most important battles in which Stergios Daoutis took part in were the Battle of Petra, the Battle of the Milia karavanserai, the Battle of Lianovergi, the Battle of Loudias and the liberation of Thessaloniki.

In the Second Balkan War he collaborated with Michail Anagnostakos in operations in Vertiskos and Assiros, as well as in the Battle of Kilkis–Lachanas.

Later he fought for the Independence of Northern Epirus (1914) as a chieftain, cooperating with the armed group of Georgios Tsontos.

== Personal life and death ==
Daoutis married Marika Papatzikou, they settled in Euboea and had two children. Daoutis died on 21 April 1973 and was buried with full honours. Local politicians and military leadership attended his funeral.
