= Patikas =

Patikas is a surname. Notable people with the surname include:

- Iraklis Patikas (1870s–?), Greek chieftain of the Macedonian Struggle
- Jim Patikas (born 1963), Australian football player
- Louiza Patikas (born 1976/1977), British actress
