= Macedonian Committee =

Greek revolutionary organization, c. 1903–1908

- Hellenic Macedonian Committee
- Μακεδονικό Κομιτάτο; Ελληνομακεδονικό Κομιτάτο
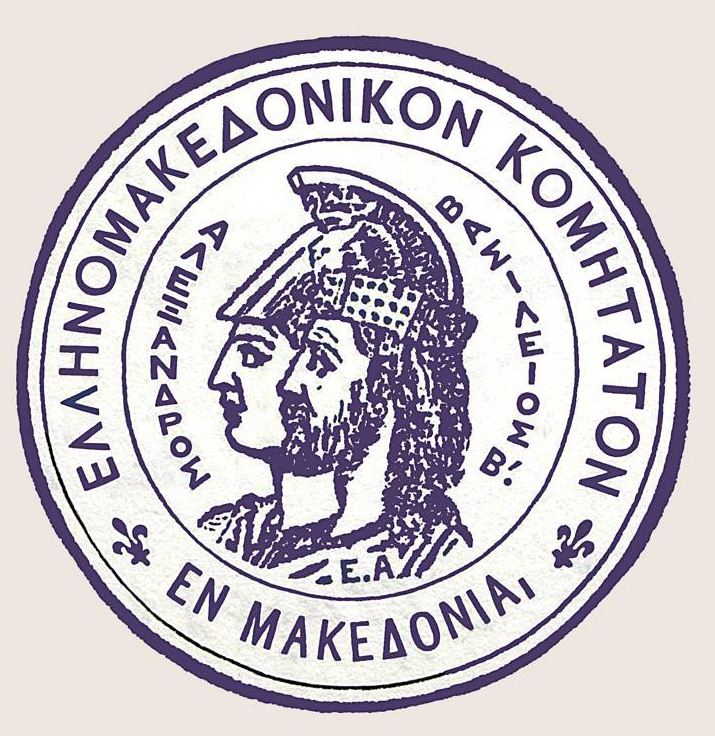
- Seal of the committee, showing Alexander the Great and Basil II ("the Bulgar Slayer").

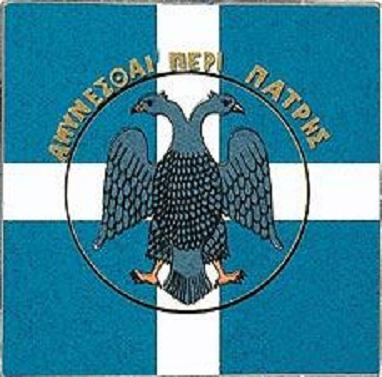
- A flag often flown and associated with the Makedonomachoi.
- Abbreviation: EMK
- Formation: c. 1903/1904
- Founder: Stefanos Dragoumis
- Founded at: Athens, Greece
- Dissolved: after July 1908
- Type: Revolutionary organization
- Headquarters: Greek consulate of Thessaloniki
- Region served: Ottoman Macedonia: Salonika Vilayet; Monastir Vilayet
- Official language: Greek
- Leader: Dimitrios Kalapothakis
- Key people: Ion Dragoumis; Germanos Karavangelis; Lambros Koromilas; Pavlos Melas; Georgios Katechakis; Gonos Yotas; Kottas and others
- Main organ: Newspaper Embros (Εμπρός)
- Affiliations: Kingdom of Greece; Hellenic Army

The Hellenic Macedonian Committee (Greek: Ελληνομακεδονικό Κομιτάτο, Ellinomakedoniko Komitato), also known as Macedonian Committee (Greek: Μακεδονικό Κομιτάτο, Makedoniko Komitato), was a Greek revolutionary organization with the aim of liberating Macedonia from the Ottoman Empire (in the vilayets of Monastir and Salonika), active during the Macedonian Struggle that also included Bulgarian and Serb revolutionary organizations.

== Establishment ==
The Ilinden-Preobrazhenie uprising from the Summer of 1903 was the alarm, when Athens realised that education alone, was not the most appropriate way of fighting the Bulgarian revolutionary activity. Despite the prior existence of Greek armed bands in the region of Ottoman Macedonia, it was not until the late 1903/early 1904 when Stefanos Dragoumis founded the Hellenic Macedonian Committee, that an organized and coordinated effort was undertaken. The committee was led by the wealthy publisher Dimitrios Kalapothakis and its members included Greek aristocrats, politicians, and other Greek notables in addition to the guerrilla fighters. This included individuals such as Ion Dragoumis, Pavlos Melas, etc. The Hellenic Macedonian Committee served as the Greek answer to the Internal Macedonian Revolutionary Organization following their increase in hostilities towards the Greek inhabitants of Macedonia. It also acted as the enforcement arm of the Greek Patriarchate, to contain and prevent further expansion of the Bulgarian Exarchate in the region. The committee took charge of the organization of guerrilla fighters in Macedonia—the Makedonomachoi—during the Macedonian Struggle (1904–1908).

== Macedonian Struggle ==
Following the establishment of the Bulgarian Exarchate, Greeks and Bulgarians were engaged in a propaganda struggle for the allegiance of the inhabitants of Macedonia. Following the abortive Ilinden Uprising in August 1903 by the Bulgarian-sponsored IMRO, the Macedonian Committee organized to protect the Greek Macedonians and preserve Greek interests in the region. Nikolaos Mavrokordatos, the ambassador of Greece, with the consul of Greece in Monastir, Ion Dragoumis, agreed to send Germanos Karavangelis to Macedonia as the Bishop of Kastoria. It was there that he realised the urgency of the situation and began the more efficient organisation of the Greek opposition. While Dragoumis concerned himself with the financial organisation of the efforts, the central figure in the military struggle was the capable Cretan officer Georgios Katechakis. Bishop Germanos Karavangelis would travel to raise morale and encourage the Macedonian Greek population to take action against the IMRO. He was also instrumental in the formation of various committees to promote Greek national interests.

=== Makedonomachoi ===
Katechakis and Karavangelis succeeded in organizing and coordinating local guerrilla groups, occasionally recruiting former IMRO members who had political and/or personal disputes within the organisation (ex. Kottas Christou, Gonos Yiotas, etc.). The armed bands were later reinforced with volunteers from free Greece, many from Crete and the Mani area of the Peloponnese. Many ex-officers of the Hellenic Army were encouraged to volunteer to provide experienced leadership and a logistical advantage, and many ultimately did. Macedonian Greeks, however, formed the core of the fighting force and proved the most important due to their extensive geographic knowledge of the region as well as a number of them possessing varying degrees of knowledge of the Bulgarian language. Many Macedonian Greeks distinguished themselves as effective chieftains and experts of unconventional warfare, such as Evangelos Natsis, Dimitrios Stagas, Georgios Savvas, Michael Sionidis, Ioannis Ramnalis, Petros Christou, Antigonos Choleris, Christos Stogiannidis, Periklis Drakos, Pavlos Rakovitis, Georgios Seridis, Iraklis Patikas, Georgios Modis, Gonos Yotas, Kottas, Stergios Daoutis and many more. The rebel fighters who fought for the Greek cause came to be known by the Greeks as Makedonomachoi (Greek: Μακεδονομάχοι; "Macedonian fighters").

Greek writer Penelope Delta portrayed the Makedonomachoi in her novel Τά μυστικά τοῦ Βάλτου (Ta Mystiká tou Váltou – The Secrets of the Swamp), and Germanos Karavangelis recalls them in his book of memoirs Ὁ Μακεδονικός Ἀγών (The Macedonian Struggle). Comparatively, the Komitadjis of the IMRO and their activities appear in the book Confessions of a Macedonian Bandit: A Californian in the Balkan Wars, written by Albert Sonnichsen, an American volunteer in the IMRO during the Macedonian Struggle.

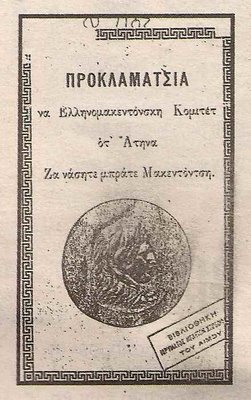
Proclamation of the Hellenic Macedonian Committee

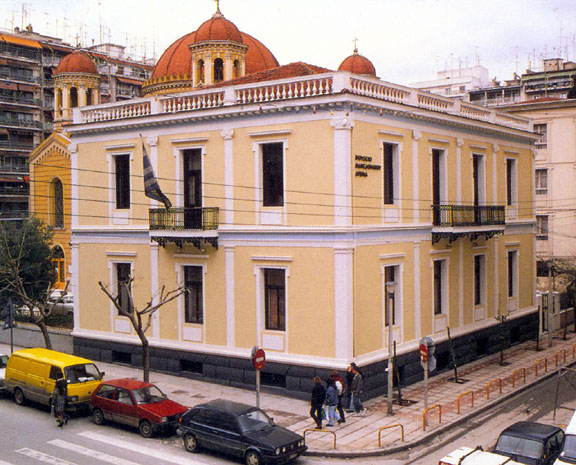
The former Greek consulate in Thessaloniki where the EMK was headquartered. It is now a Museum for the Macedonian Struggle.

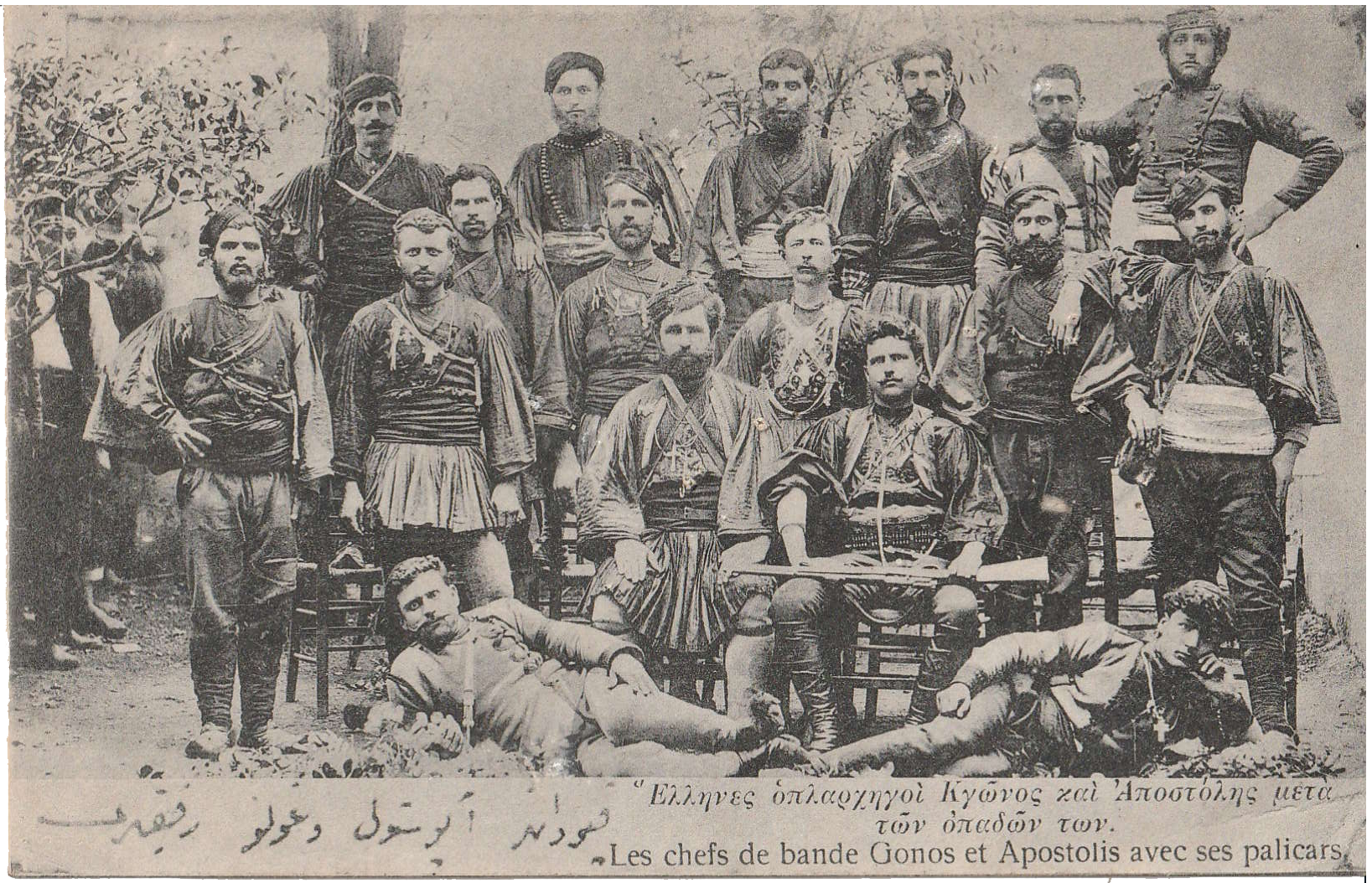
A group of Macedonian Committee fighters

== Sources ==
- Karavangelis, Germanos: "The Macedonian Struggle" (Memoirs)
- Dakin, D. (1993). The Greek Struggle in Macedonia: 1897-1913. Museio tu Makedoniku Agōnos [Museum of the Macedonian Struggle]. ISBN 978-960-85303-2-4.
- Αφανεις γηγενεις Μακεδονομαχοι: (1903-1913). University Studio Press. 2008. ISBN 978-960-12-1724-6.
- Rappoport, Alfred: Au pays des martyrs. Notes et souvenirs d'un ancien consul-général d'Autriche-Hongrie en Macédoine (1904–1909). Librarie Universitaire J. Gamber, Paris, 1927. Memoirs of the General Consul of Austro-Hungary in Macedonia. Cat. No. 7029530203814.
- Livanios, D., 1999. ‘Conquering the souls’: nationalism and Greek guerrilla warfare in Ottoman Macedonia, 1904–1908. Byzantine and Modern Greek Studies, 23, pp. 195–221.
