= Iraklis Patikas =

Greek chieftain of the Macedonian Struggle

Kapetan (Chieftain) Iraklis Patikas
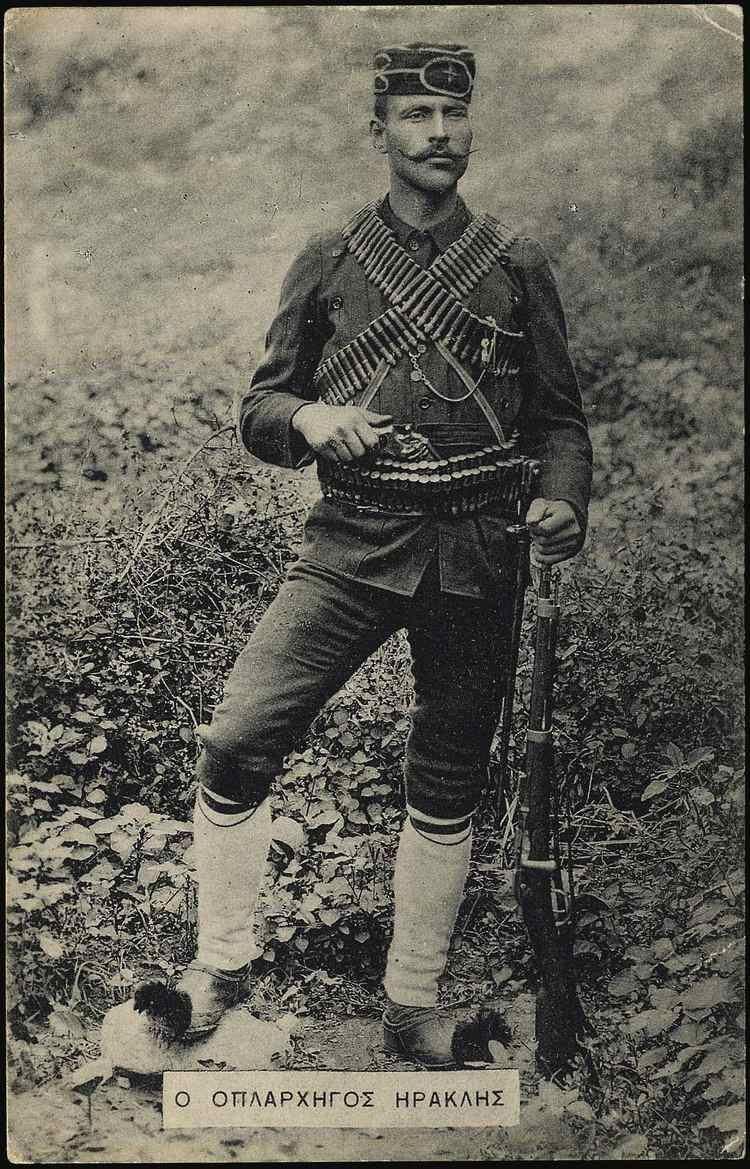
- Patikas c. 1904-1908
- Native name: Ηρακλής Πατίκας
- Nickname: Kapetan Iraklis (Καπετάν Ηρακλής)
- Born: c. 1870s Vasilika, Salonika Vilayet, Ottoman Empire (now Greece)
- Allegiance: Kingdom of Greece
- Branch: HMC
- Conflicts: Macedonian Struggle

Iraklis Patikas (Greek: Ηρακλής Πατίκας), known as well with his nickname Kapetan Iraklis, was a significant Greek chieftain of the Macedonian Struggle.

== Biography ==
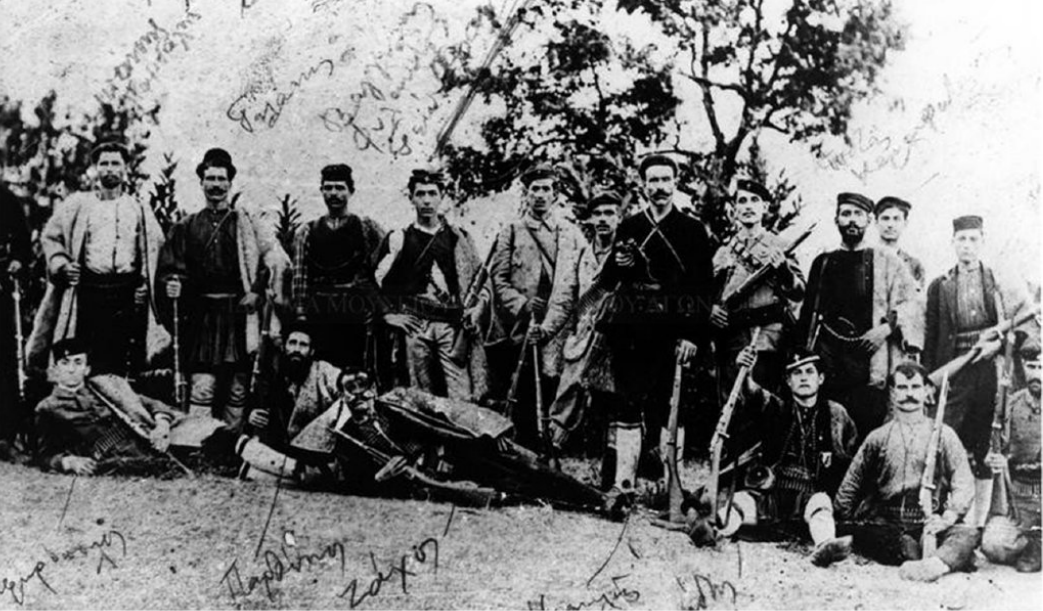
Iraklis Patikas with his armed group.

Patikas was born in the 1870s in Vasilika of Thessaloniki. Initially, he served as a soldier in armed groups operating in the areas of Thermi, Langadas and Polygyros, against the Bulgarian komitadjis who were trying to penetrate this geographical area, but also against the Ottoman authorities. He soon emerged to a great chieftain who acted autonomously in the same areas. In the spring of 1908, he collaborated with the officers Ar. Kois, P. Papatzaneteas, D. Galanopoulos and D. Kourtzis, as well as with chieftain Georgios Vlachos, a local of Chalkidiki. In June of that year, he defeated a Bulgarian attack in Arnaia. With the revolution of the Young Turks and the general amnesty that they gave, he returned to his home town, just like the rest of his cooperators.

In 1916, with the outbreak of the National Defense coup d'état, the family of Patikas was expelled by the Venizelist forces, who, after destroying the property of his family, also pursued him, forcing him to escape in order to avoid imprisonment.

== Sources ==
- Εφημερίδα: Άποψη και όχι μόνο, τεύχος 9, Ιούνιος 2010, Η άποψη της Δ.Ο. ΠΑΣΟΚ Βασιλικών για την ονομασία του νέου Καλλικράτειου ∆ήμου Βασιλικών - Θέρμης - Μίκρας
- Παλαιοχώρι Χαλκιδικής, Η ωμότητες των Βενιζελικών στη Χαλκιδική
- Konstantinos A. Vakalopoulos, Ο ένοπλος αγώνας στη Μακεδονία 1904-1908, Irodotos, Thessaloniki, 1999, p. 325
