= Georgios Savvas =

Greek revolutionary chieftain of the Macedonian Struggle

Kapetan (Chieftain) Georgios Savvas
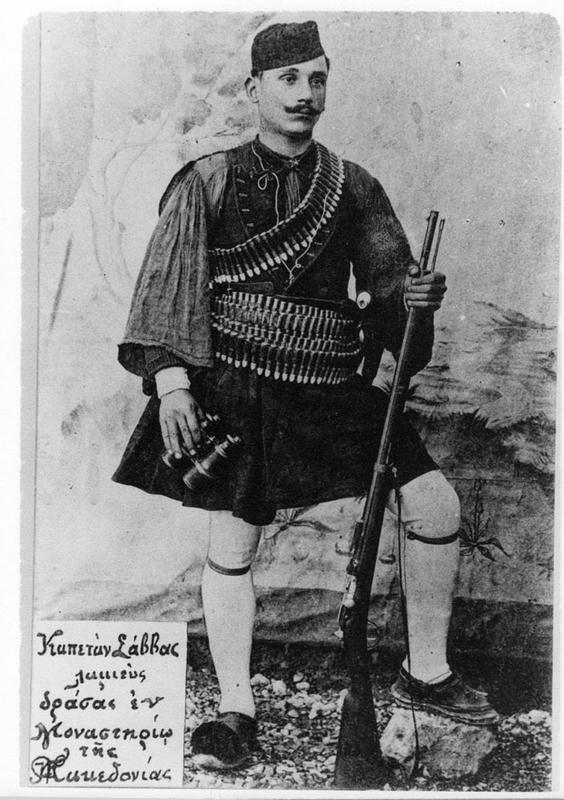
- Savvas during the Macedonian Struggle.
- Native name: Γεώργιος Σάββας
- Born: c. 1880s Thessaloniki, Salonika Vilayet, Ottoman Empire (now Greece)
- Allegiance: Kingdom of Greece
- Service / branch: HMC
- Awards: Commemorative Medal for the Macedonian Struggle

Georgios Savvas (Greek: Γεώργιος Σάββας) was a Greek revolutionary chieftain of the Macedonian Struggle.

== Biography ==
Savvas was born in the 1880s in Thessaloniki. He participated in an armed group at Olympus at the beginning of the Macedonian Struggle. He soon became a leader of a small group. There he met with Konstantinos Mazarakis-Ainian and at the end of 1905, Mazarakis asked him to move with his team in Mariovo after the damage the Greek bodies suffered there. There, expanding his body, he cooperated with Captain Theodosis, Kapetan Garefis and Em. Katsigaris. He acted in the area of Mariovo and Almopia throughout the Macedonian Struggle, persecuting the Bulgarian groups.

== Sources ==
- Hellenic Army General Staff, Army History Directorate, Ο Μακεδονικός Αγών και τα εις Θράκην γεγονότα, Athens 1979, p. 181, 223
- John S. Koliopoulos (editor), Αφανείς, γηγενείς Μακεδονομάχοι, Εταιρεία Μακεδονικών Σπουδών, University Studio Press, Thessaloniki, 2008, p. 55
- Μακεδονικός Αγώνας, Η έναρξη του Αγώνα, οι μάχες κατά την διάρκειά του και η πορεία των πρωταγωνιστών που έλαβαν μέρος.
