= Folklore Museum of Giannitsa =

- Λαογραφικό Μουσείο Γιαννιτσών
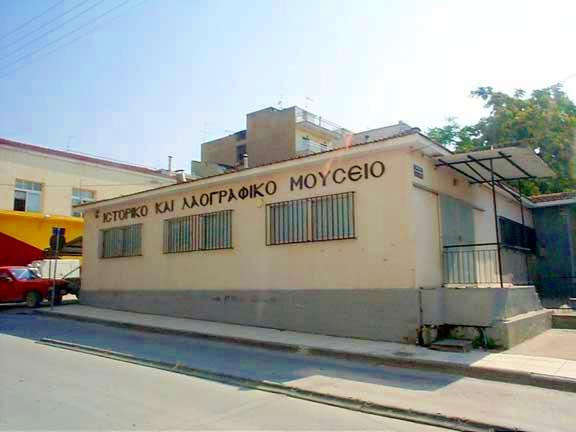
- Outside view
- Established: October 1977
- Location: Giannitsa, Greece
- Coordinates: 40.78998755123008°N 22.410008272040784°E
- Type: Art museum
- Founders: "Philippos" History and Folklore Association

The Folklore Museum of Giannitsa (Greek: Λαογραφικό Μουσείο Γιαννιτσών) is opened in October 1977 and housed in a prefabricated structure in center of the town of Giannitsa, Macedonia, Greece. It was established recently by the "Philippos" History and Folklore Association with the aim of promoting local history and tradition.

== Exhibits ==
It displays artefacts relating to local folk culture, domestic artefacts (cauldrons, baking trays, bowls, clothes irons heated with coals), and the implements and tools of various rural and urban trades and occupations that are no longer used (scratch plough, loom, adzes, saws, workbenches).

There are also showcases displaying authentic men's and women's costumes of the nineteenth and twentieth centuries, both everyday wear and formal attire.

Particular emphasis is given to the period of the Macedonian Struggle, the exhibits including authentic uniforms, weapons, and personalia of Macedonian guerrillas who were active around Giannitsa Lake, maps of the lake area, numerous photographs of the life of the Macedonian fighters and the local villagers in the huts on the lake and of specific events during the Struggle in the surrounding area, and also a portrait of the local Macedonian fighter Kapetan Gonos Giotas.

== Gallery ==
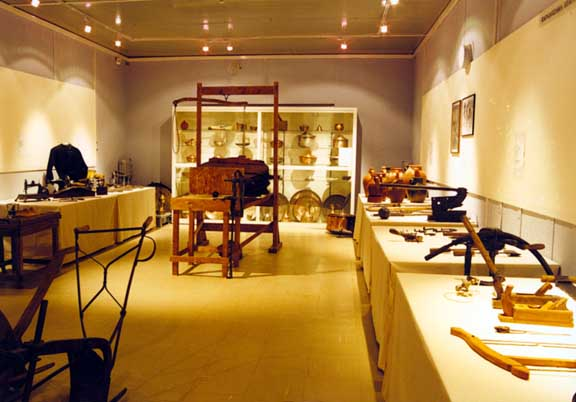
Agricultural Equipment

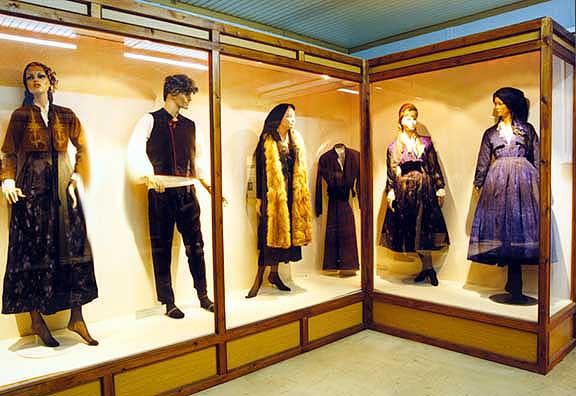
Traditional Costumes

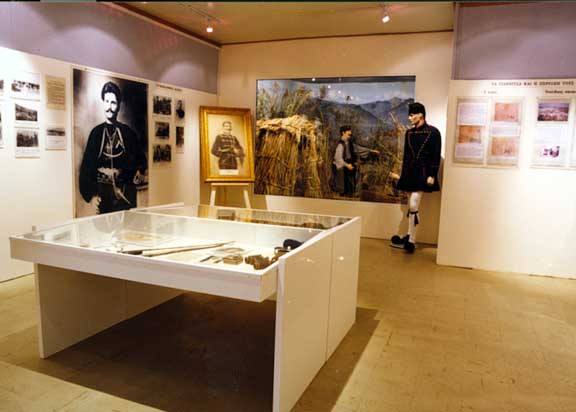
Exhibits of the Macedonian Struggle
