= Apostol Petkov =

Macedonian Bulgarian revolutionary

Voivode Apostol Petkov
- Апостол Петков
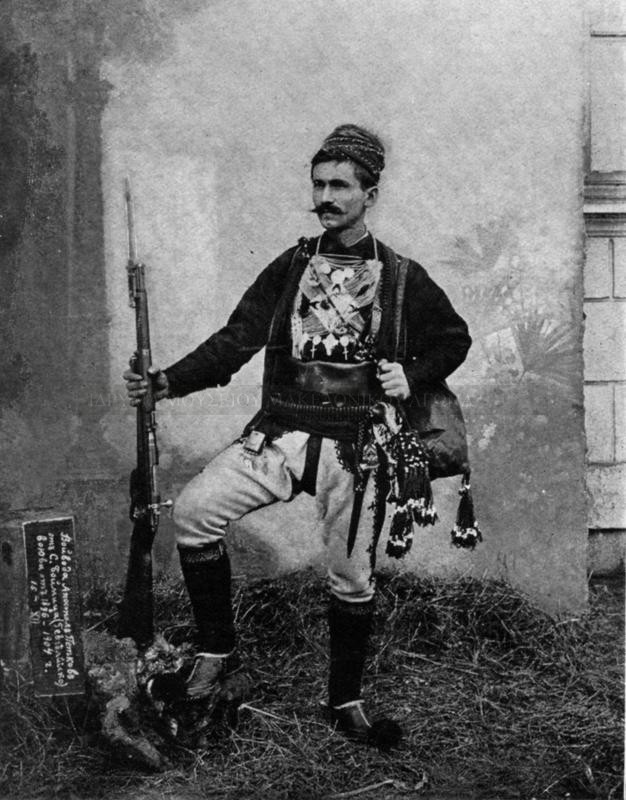
- Apostol Petkov during the Macedonian Struggle
- Born: Apostol Petkov Terziev (Апостол Петков Терзиев); May 6, 1869; Boymitsa, Salonika Vilayet, Ottoman Empire
- Died: August 2, 1911 (aged 42); Krushari, Salonika Vilayet, Ottoman Empire
- Burial place: Giannitsa, Greece
- Relatives: Gonos Yiotas
- Military career
- Allegiance: IMRO
- Service years: 1897-1911
- Nickname: Sun of Enidzhe-Vardar
- Conflicts: Ilinden Uprising; Macedonian Struggle †

Apostol Petkov Terziev (Bulgarian/Macedonian: Апостол Петков Терзиев; May 6, 1869 – August 2, 1911) was a Macedonian Bulgarian revolutionary and one of the leaders of the national liberation movement in Ottoman Macedonia. He was a leading komitadji in the armed units of the Internal Macedonian Revolutionary Organization and later participated in the Bulgarian People's Macedonian-Adrianople Revolutionary Organization. He took part in the battles against the Ottoman authorities in the Ilinden-Preobrazhenie Uprising and Macedonian Struggle. Petkov was often referred to by his admirers as the Sun of Enidzhe-Vardar.

== Early life ==
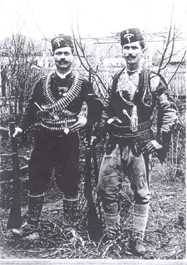
Petkov (right) and Ivan Karasuliiski (left) c. 1895.

Apostol Petkov was born Apostol Terziev, a member of the old Terviev family, in the town of Boymitsa (modern Axioupoli, Greece). Petkov was illiterate but found a job working as a cantonment officer on the Thessaloniki-Skopje railway line, where he remained until 1892 when he decided to become a rebel. He had two brothers (Mito and Tano) and a cousin (Andon) who would also join the rebels, which led to their deaths. He was also the first cousin of Gonos Yiotas (Gono Yotov), a Slavophone Greek, who after initially siding with IMRO, defected to the Greek side. Petkov joined the Internal Macedonian Revolutionary Organization in 1897.

== Ilinden Uprising ==
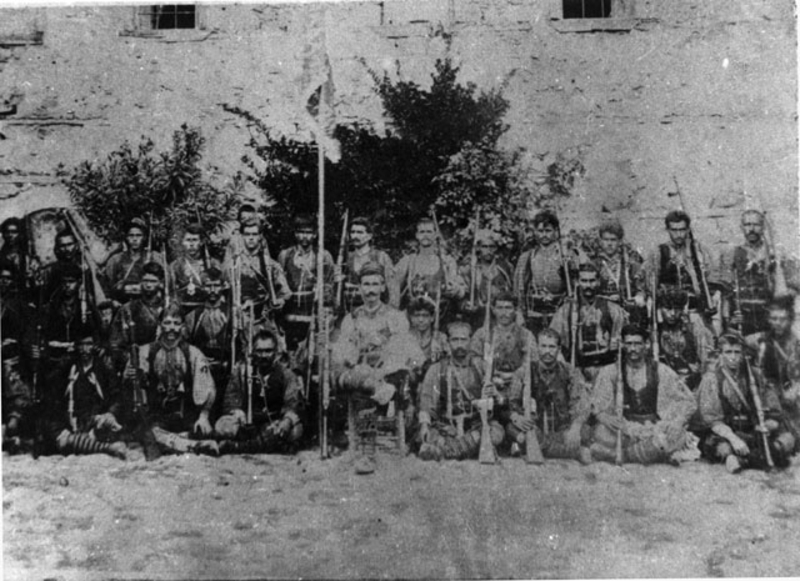
Petkov (center) and his armed band during the Ilinden Uprising.

By the time of the Ilinden–Preobrazhenie Uprising in 1903, Petkov had become voivode, of an armed group around the town of Giannitsa, where he took an active part in the rebellion. As he was a voivode of the Enidzhe-Vardar district, peasants referred to him as the "Sun of Enidzhe-Vardar". Under his leadership, a bridge over the Vardar was blown up and the telegraph cables of the village of Grubevtsi (now Argosykia) were cut. With a force of 250, Petkov launched an attack on the local Ottoman garrison, however, the Ottomans were prepared. the Ottomans soldiers gathered in Goumenissa and the komitadjis took the high ground on the hills above. A bomb attack was planned and unsuccessfully carried out with only one of the bombs exploding. Apostol withdrew his rebels to Mount Paiko. He then divided his force into smaller groups to attack an Ottoman contingent of 110 soldiers resulting in one death on each side. A month later, Petkov engaged an Ottoman force of 1100 on Mount Paiko with just 103 men to his disposal. The following day, he and six other komitadjis engaged 80 Ottoman soldiers killing four and losing two. A month later they would inflict significant casualties on a mixed infantry and cavalry unit from Giannitsa. The uprising was ultimately put down and Petkov fled to Bulgaria.

== Macedonian Struggle ==
Petkov returned to Ottoman Macedonia in 1904 to resume the struggle. He was contacted by the Greek consul of Thessaloniki, Lambros Koromilas to ask him to join the Greek struggle in the region but an agreement was not reached. Greek revolutionary Alexandros Mazarakis-Ainian had claimed that no agreement was reached because he had economic interests in Bulgaria, however, this was not proven. The Greeks and Bulgarians were both trying to fortify their positions in the area in anticipation of the impending end of the Ottoman rule. Petkov took it upon himself to raise the morale of those aligned with the Bulgarian Exarchate, which had fallen after the Ilinden Uprising. He had erected gallows in Giannitsa as a fear tactic towards the Greeks and others who supported the Greek struggle. In August 1904, Apostol would seek revenge for the death of fellow komitadji Tsiopkas and his band who had been killed by the Ottomans following notification from the Greek Consulate of Thessaloniki. His revenge took the form of the killing of a distinguished Greek and his family of the village of Gradelfos. In September 1904, Petkov killed a man from Barovitsa (modern Kastaneri, Paionia (municipality), Greece), who was allegedly an informant of the government, by decapitating him in his home in front of his wife and children. Petkov sent a letter to the governor of the province, claiming full responsibility for the execution. The Ottoman authorities denied that the man was an informant.

In early March 1905, the band of Petkov and another of Sava Mihaylov numbering 42 komitadjis in total, were surrounded at the village of Gevgelija Smoli (Mikro Thasos) by the Ottoman army and bashi-bazouks. A 4-5 hour clash ensued resulting in the almost extermination of the komitadjis with 36 killed. Petkov was wounded in the heel but escaped with five others. He was able to quickly organize a band and in the same year, had great successes against the Ottoman army and the Greek Makedonomachoi. By the end of 1905, Petkov was involved in many attempts to forcefully convert the allegiances of villages from the Patriarchate to the Exarchate with demands that local Slavophone Greek Patriarshists declare themselves Bulgarians or face his consequences. From 1906 to 1908, Petkov and his komitadjis clashed with the band of Kapetan Alexandros Mazarakis-Ainian (Akritas) and other Greek chieftains in various battles.

== After the Young Turks Revolution ==
Petkov was pardoned following the Young Turk Revolution, However, he was disappointed in the new policy that was put in place and went to Bulgaria in 1910. In that same year, Petkov became one of the organizers of the Bulgarian People's Macedonian-Adrianople Revolutionary Organization and re-entered Ottoman Macedonia with a new armed band. This would restart the military struggle against the Ottoman and Greek interests in Macedonia.

== Death ==
On August 2, 1911, Petkov was killed, under unclear circumstances. One version claims he was poisoned by Theodoros Tsiftes (Todor Chifteov), a former IMRO-activist and member of his band, who had defected to the Greek side. The second and less probable version claims that he was killed in battle against Turkish gendarmes. He died together with Ioryi Mucitano and Vasil Pufkata.

== Gallery ==
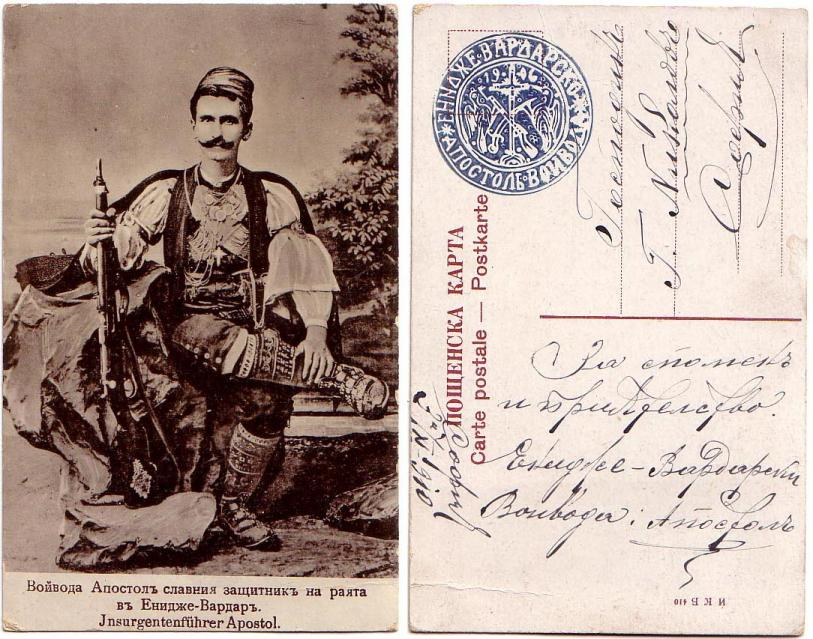
Bulgarian postcard with picture from Petkov signed and stamped. Sent from him to his fellow Tane Nikolov c. 1910

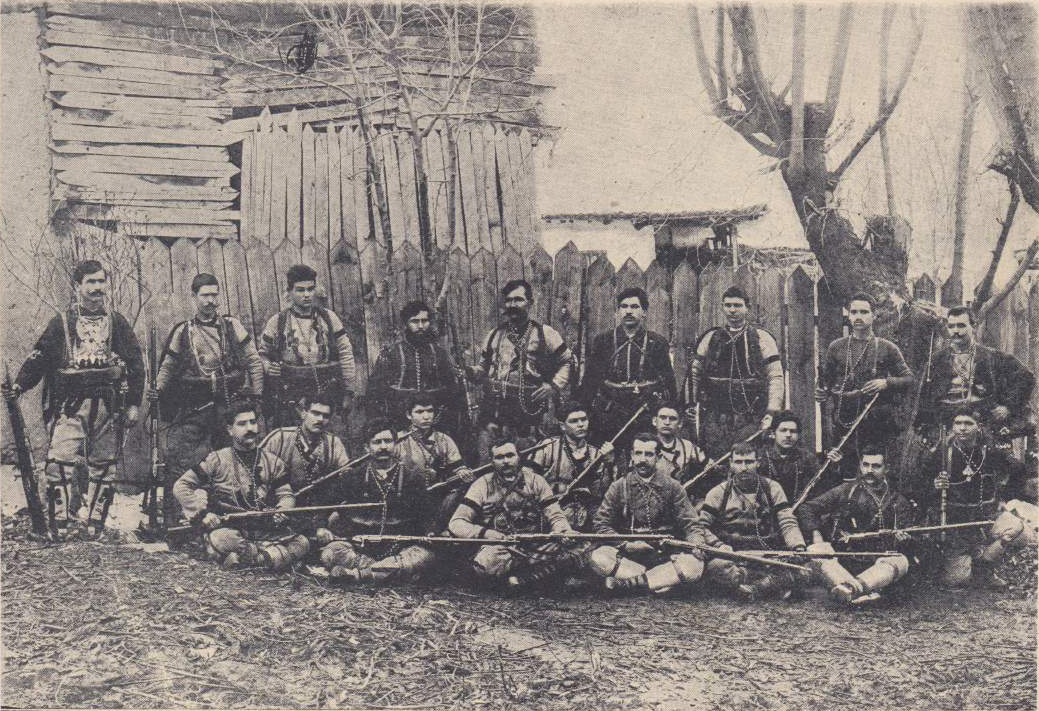
Petkov (far left) and his band.

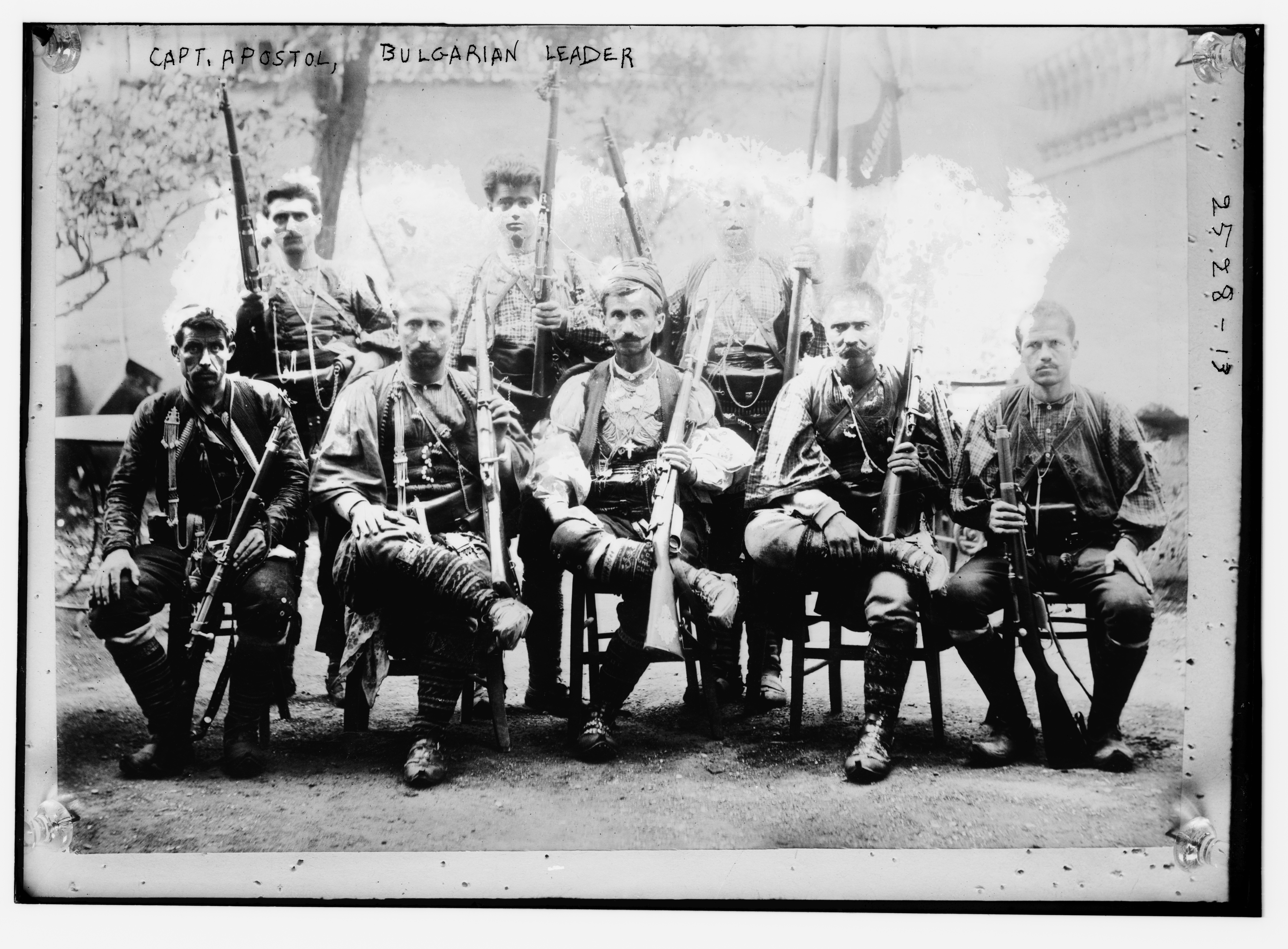
Apostol Petkov (center) and other Komitadjis c. 1905

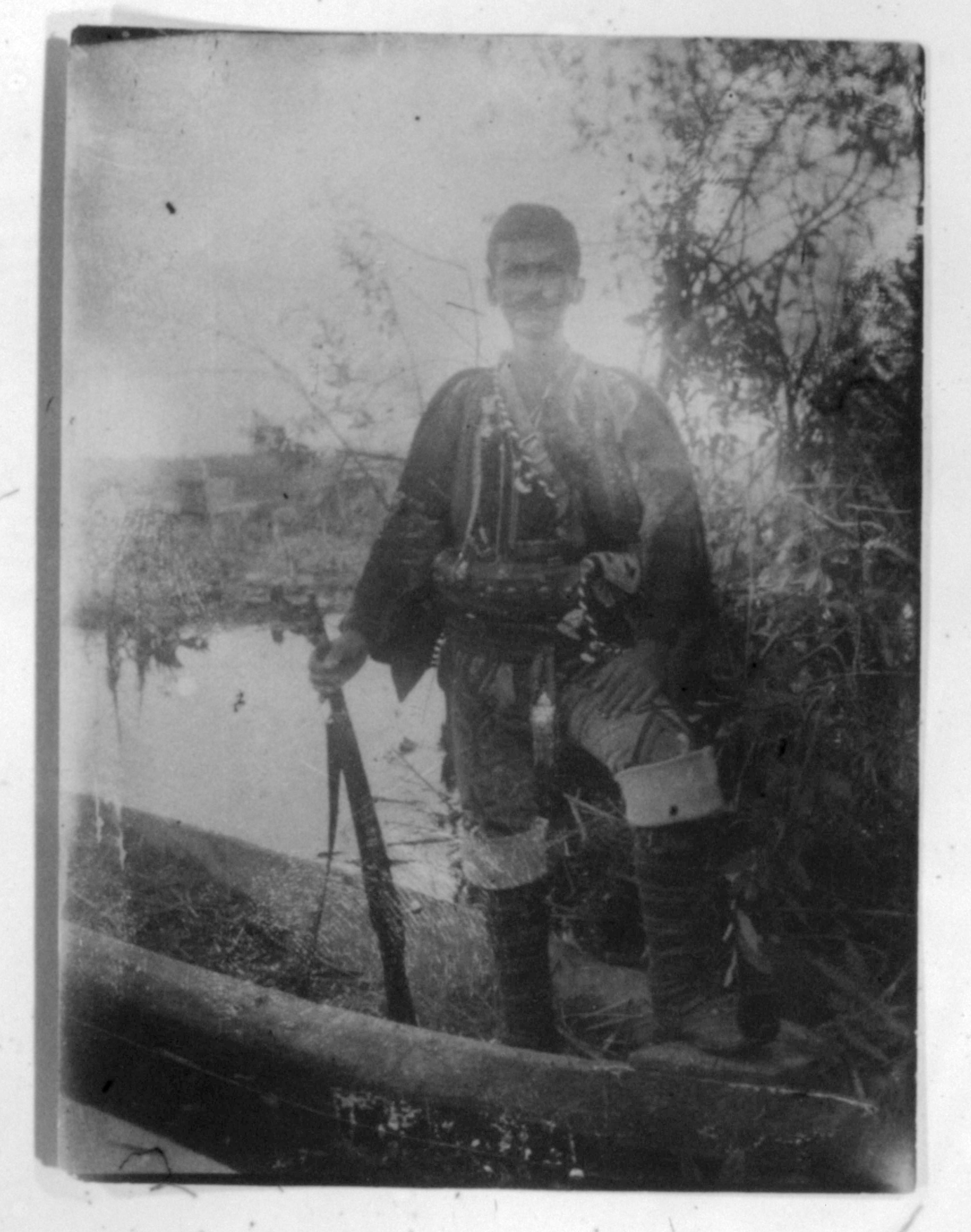
Petkov at Giannitsa Lake, photographed by Albert Sonnichsen

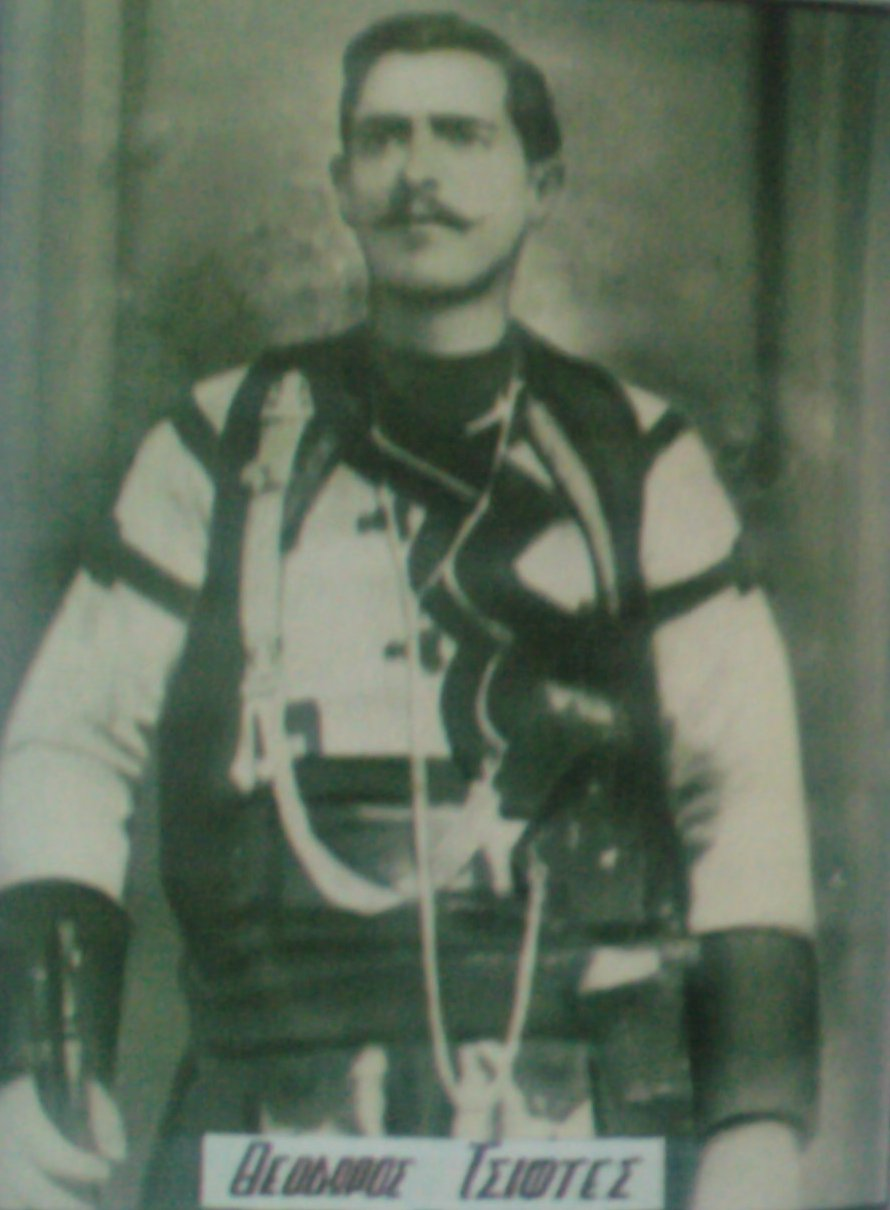
Theodoros Tsiftes, suspected of poisoning Petkov.

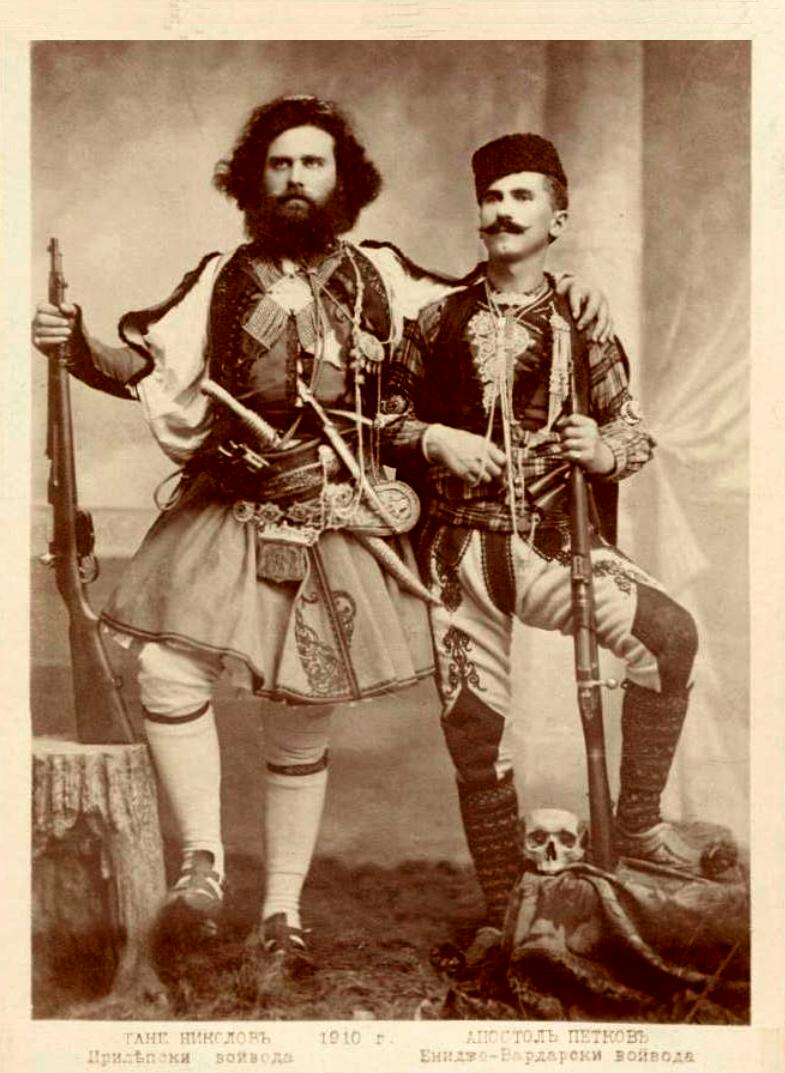
Apostol Petkov (right) and Tane Nikolov (left) c. 1910

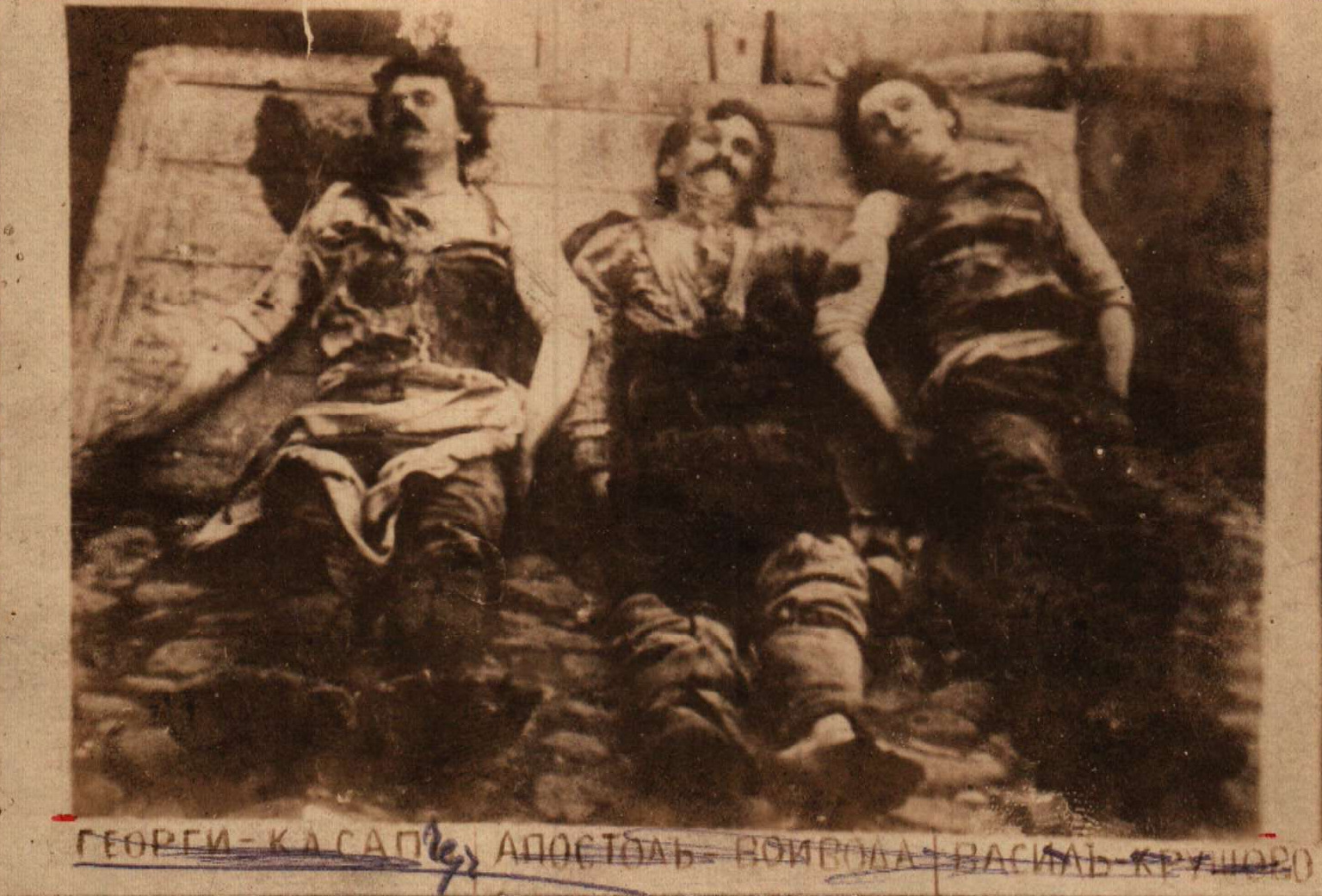
The bodies of Apostol Petkov (center), Ioryi Mucitano (left) and Vasil Pufkata (right)

== See also ==
- Atanas Gradoborliyata
- Ohrana
