= Periklis Drakos =

Greek chieftain of the Macedonian Struggle

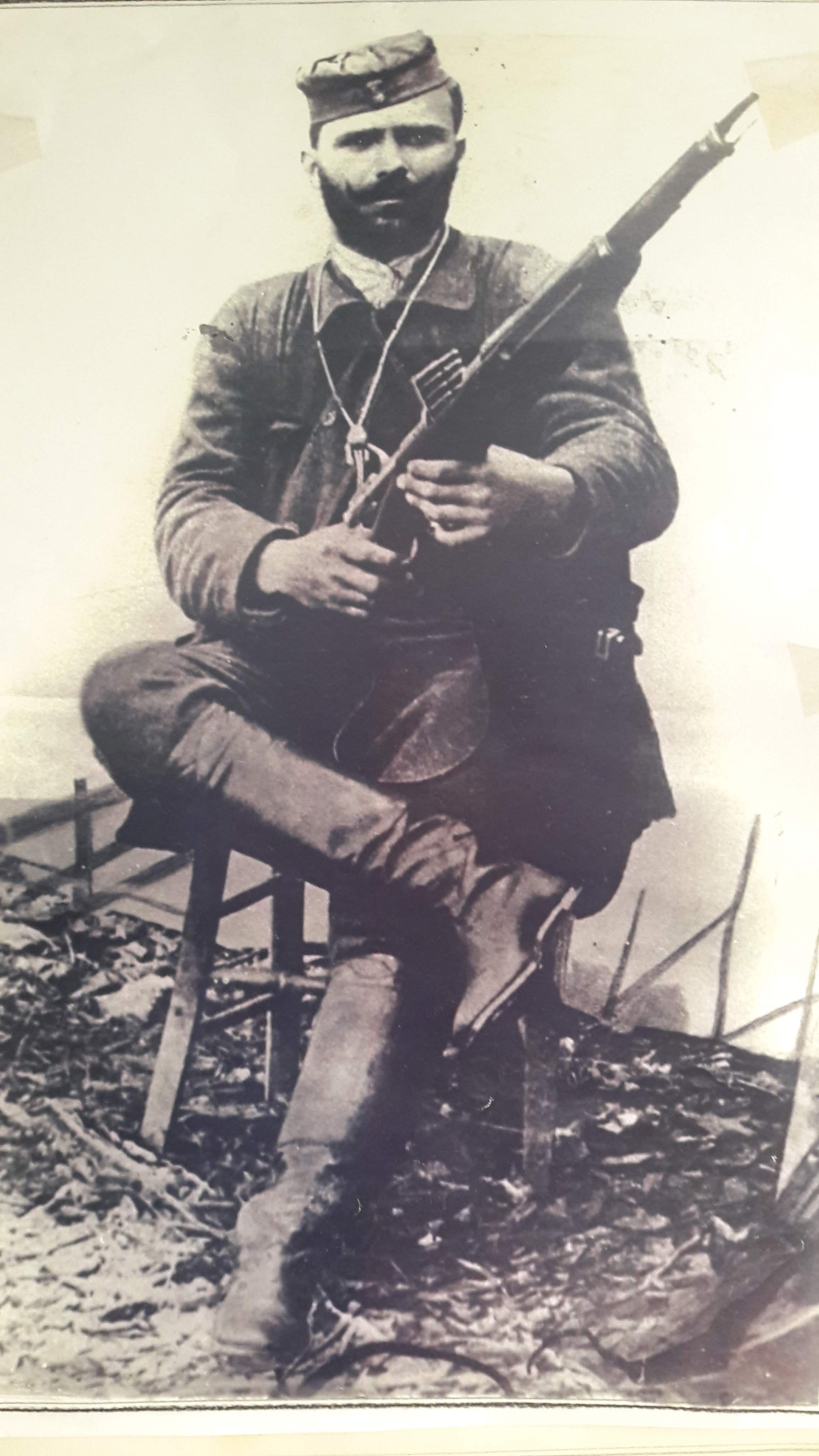
- Perilkis Drakos during the Macedonian Struggle
- Native name: Περικλής Δράκος
- Born: Kavala, Adrianople Vilayet, Ottoman Empire, (now Greece)
- Allegiance: Kingdom of Greece
- Branch: Hellenic Army
- Conflicts: Macedonian Struggle; Balkan Wars; First Balkan War; Second Balkan War

Periklis Drakos (Greek: Περικλής Δράκος) was a Greek chieftain of the Macedonian Struggle.

== Biography ==
Drakos was born in Kavala in the late 19th century. He started his armed action during the Macedonian Struggle, initially collaborating with the National Center of Xanthi. Among other things, his mission was to transfer guns to other Greek rebels. Later, he set up an armed body that operated in the regions of Kavala and Xanthi. He was associated with the murder of Iliya Hadzhigeorgiev, a member of the Bulgarian Committee in Xanthi.

His armed group took part in the First Balkan War under the command of Konstantinos Mazarakis-Ainian, Vasileios Papakostas and Georgios Galanopoulos. He was firstly sent to Chalkidiki to strengthen the body of Ioannis Ramnalis against the Ottoman forces and then sent to Nigrita to support Georgios Giaglis against the Bulgarians. There, the Bulgarian army did not recognize the forces of Georgios Giaglis and Periklis Drakos as belonging to the Hellenic Army—and thus, under the terms of the Balkan League, as co-combatants—and asked to occupy the city. Following the refusal of the Macedonian chieftains, the Bulgarians attacked, but in the battle that followed, they were defeated. In the Second Balkan War, Drakos and his group took part in several battles against the Bulgarian forces.

== Sources ==
- Αρχείο Διεύθυνσης Εφέδρων Πολεμιστών Αγωνιστών Θυμάτων Αναπήρων (ΔΕΠΑΘΑ), Αρχείο Μακεδονικού Αγώνα, φ. Δ-33
- John S. Koliopoulos (editor), Αφανείς, γηγενείς Μακεδονομάχοι, Εταιρεία Μακεδονικών Σπουδών, University Studio Press, Thessaloniki, 2008, p. 66
