= Ioannis Ramnalis =

Greek chieftain

Kapetan (Chieftain) Ioannis Ramnalis
- Ιωάννης Ράμναλης
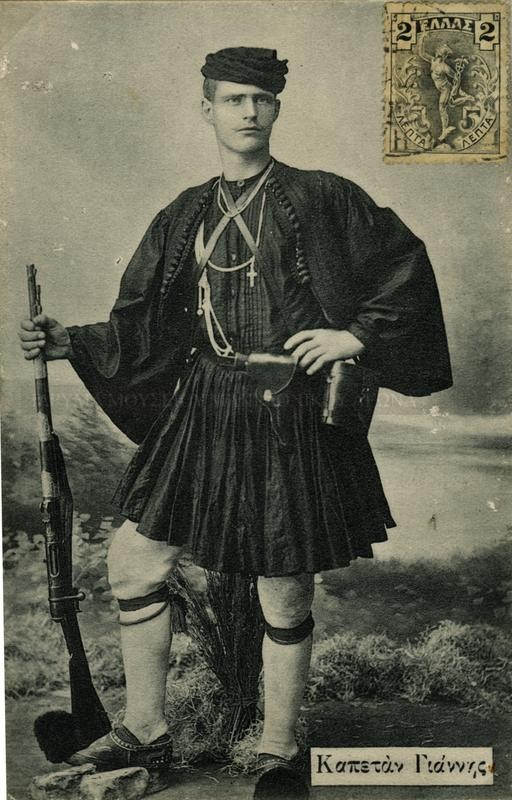
- Ramnalis during the Macedonian Struggle.
- Born: Ioannis Villioglou (Ιωάννης Βίλλιογλου) c. 1885; Rafna, Salonika Vilayet, Ottoman Empire (now Isoma, Greece)
- Died: 5 December 1923 (aged 37–38); Lagkadikia, Kingdom of Greece
- Relatives: Dimitrios Villioglou (father); Domna Villioglou (mother)
- Military career
- Allegiance: Kingdom of Greece
- Branch: HMC; Hellenic Army
- Conflicts: Macedonian Struggle; Balkan Wars: First Balkan War; Second Balkan War

Ioannis Villioglou, known also as Ioannis Ramnalis (Greek: Ιωάννης Βίλλιογλου ή Ράμναλης; 1885 – 1923) was a Greek chieftain from Rafna (today's Isoma) in Kilkis. He is mostly known for his involvement in the Macedonian Struggle.

== Early life ==
Ramnalis was born in 1885 in Rafna (today's Isoma) in Kilkis. His father was Dimitrios Villioglou and his mother was Domna (Domnitsa). When he was 17 years old, his parents and an uncle were murdered by Bulgarian komitadjis.

== Armed action ==
In autumn 1904 Ramnalis was in Serres. There, a trader had rented part of his house to the Bulgarian revolutionary committee to be used as a school, which caused great upheaval to the Greek community of the city. In response, the young Ramnalis, fatally stabbed the trader and then he fled to Thessaloniki. There, he found asylum in the Greek consulate, asking to join the army. At first, in the spring of 1905, he was placed as a rifleman in the force of Ioannis Sakellaropoulos (Zirias) that operated in Kalindria of Kilkis. Their base of operations was at the territories of the local landowner Charisis. Shortly afterwards, the force was detected by the Ottoman authorities and after a scuffle it disbanded. The majority of the insurgents were killed or captured. Few escaped arrest however, including Ioannis Ramnalis, who, disguised as a villager, managed to return to Thessaloniki.

In the same year, by order of the army center in Thessaloniki, Ramnalis set up a small military force that operated in the areas of Langadas, Vertiskos and Lachanas. Ramnalis and his men, using their farming life as a cover up, were often making night raids against Bulgarian targets. Using this tactic, they managed to kill several armed as well as unarmed prominent citizens that supported the Bulgarian revolutionary committee. Meanwhile, in 1907 they successfully assaulted Zarova, which was an important center of the Bulgarian komitandjis, while in August 1908 Ramnalis dodged an assassination attempt against him also in Zarova. Moreover, Ramnalis’ military action in the area caused the Turkish bandit Halil Tsaous to leave the region.

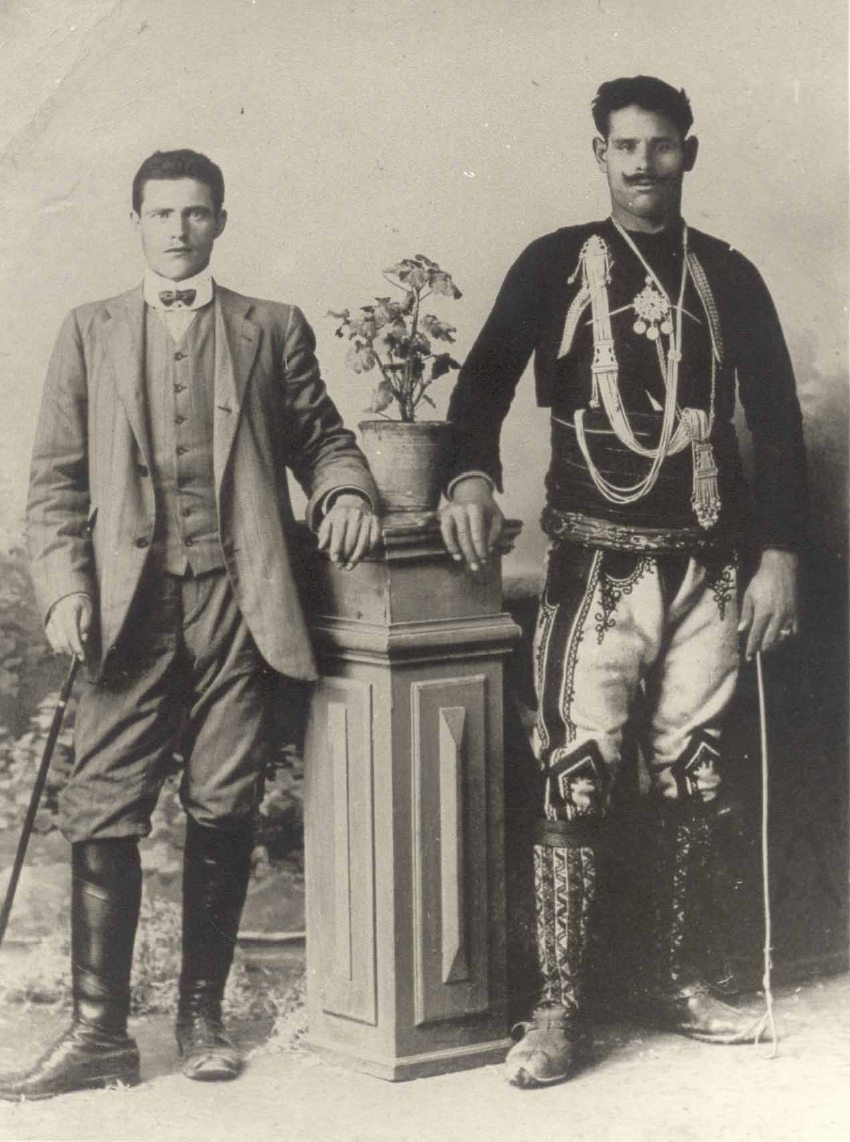
Ioannis Ramnalis (left) and Lazos Dogiamas (right).

In 1908, after the Young Turk Revolution and the granting of general amnesty, Ioannis Ramnalis handed over his weapons. After a short period of time though, when the Young Turks began to persecute Greeks, he fled to Athens. There, he finished school and tried to enroll in the Hellenic Military Academy. However, in 1912 he interrupted his studies, returned to Macedonia and reformed his armed force taking part in the Balkan Wars fighting against Ottoman and Bulgarian troops.

== Later years and death ==
After the end of the war, the Greek state granted to Ioannis Ramnalis, a rural area in Lagkadikia, where he settled. He started a family and he had a son, Dimitrios, and a daughter, Domna. He gained great wealth from the land thereby becoming a bandits’ target. On December 5, 1923, he was attacked by a gang of bandits and during the scuffle he was fatally injured.

== Legacy ==
In his hometown, Isoma in Kilkis, a bust of him was placed by the Cultural Association of Isoma.

== Bibliography ==
- A. Anestopoulos, Ο Μακεδονικός Αγών 1903 – 1908, vol.1 (Α΄), Θεσσαλονίκη, 1969.
- Ioannis S. Koliopoulos, (edit.), Αφανείς, γηγενείς Μακεδονομάχοι, Εταιρεία Μακεδονικών Σπουδών, University Studio Press, Θεσσαλονίκη, 2008.
- G. Ch. Modis, Μακεδονικός Αγών και Μακεδόνες Αρχηγοί, β΄έκδοση, Θεσσαλονίκη 2007.
- Pavlos L. Tsamis, Μακεδονικός Αγών, ΕΜΣ, Θεσσαλονίκη 1975.
