= Gonos Yotas =

Slavophone Greek chieftain of the Macedonian Struggle

Gonos Yiotas
- Γκόνος Γιώτας; Гоно Йотов
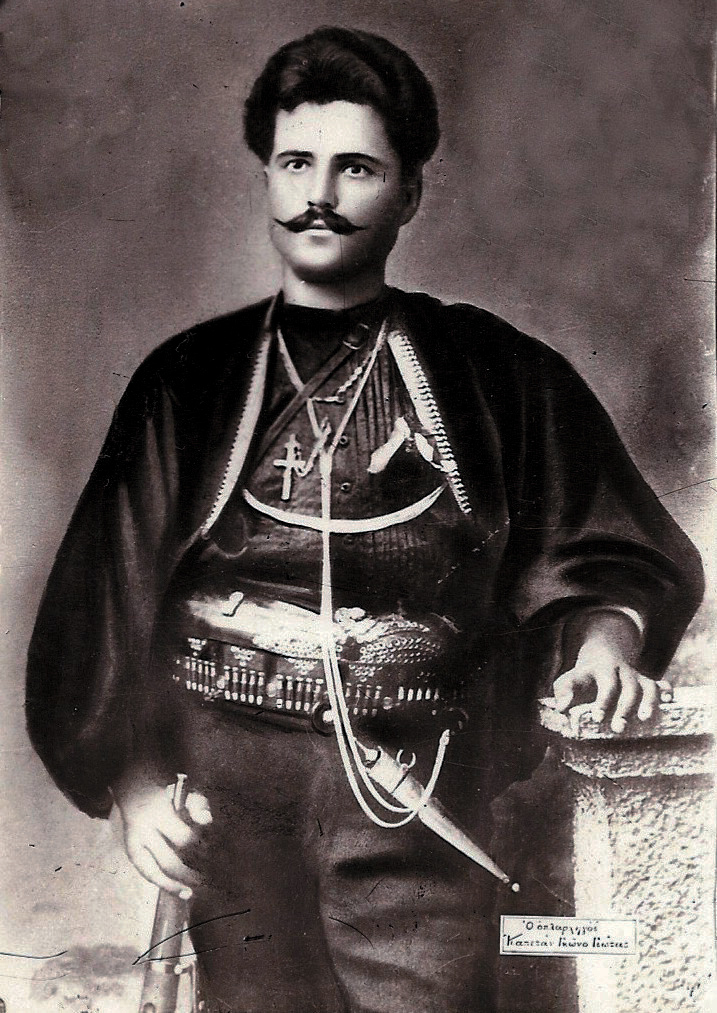
- Gonos Yiotas c. 1900s
- Born: Georgios Yiotas; Γεώργιος Γιώτας; Георги Йотов; 1880; Plugar, Salonika Vilayet, Ottoman Empire (now Loudias, Greece)
- Died: 12 February 1911 (aged 30–31); Giannitsa Lake, Salonika Vilayet, Ottoman Empire (now Greece)
- Burial place: Old Cemetery of Giannitsa
- Relatives: Apostol Petkov (first cousin)
- Military career
- Allegiance: IMRO (1900-1904); Kingdom of Greece
- Branch: HMC
- Service years: 1900-1911
- Nicknames: The Ghost of the Lake το Στοιχείο της Λίμνης; The Wild Beast of the Swamp το Θεριό του Βάλτου
- Conflicts: Macedonian Struggle †; Ilinden Uprising

Signature
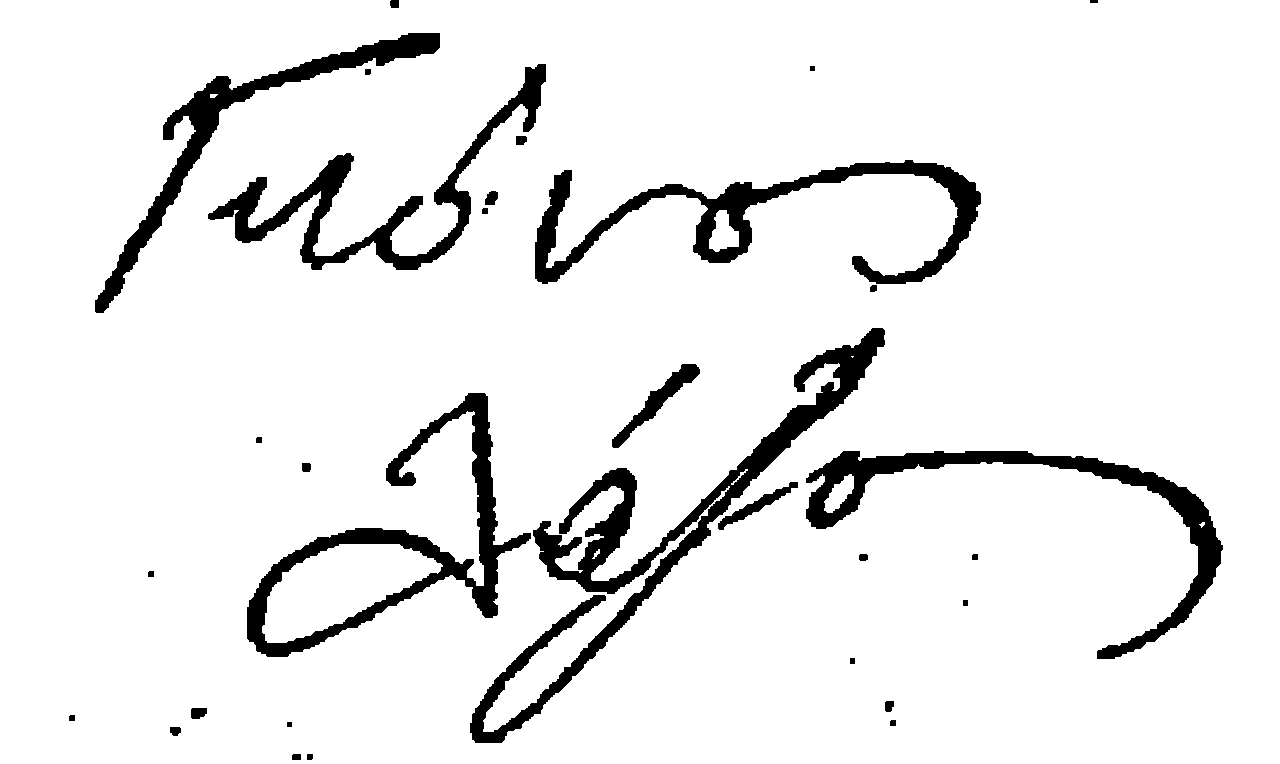

Georgios Yiotas (Greek: Γεώργιος Γιώτας; Bulgarian: Γеорги Йотов), best known as Gonos Yiotas (Greek: Γκόνος Γιώτας; Bulgarian: Γоно Йотов), was a Greek chieftain of the Macedonian Struggle. He is revered as a hero in Greece and ranks among the most notable participants of the Macedonian Struggle. He mainly operated around the Giannitsa Lake and came to be known as the "Ghost of the Lake" (το Στοιχείο της Λίμνης).

== Early life ==
Georgios Yiotas was born in the village of Plugar in 1880, a village near Giannitsa. He was a Slavophone, only learning Greek in his early to mid-twenties. His father, Vasileios Yiotas was from the village of Kadinovo (now Galatades) and had been a member of a local Greek committee. From a young age, he worked with his father and his brother Konstantinos Yiotas (also a future Makedonomachos) in the fields of the Agios Loukas Monastery just off the Lake of Giannitsa. It was there that he learned to operate a firearm as his father was an armed guard.

He was first cousins with Apostol Petkov, a Bulgarian IMRO leader, who became known as the "Sun of Yenice-i Vardar."

== Early Armed Action ==
Gonos Yiotas had been involved with the IMRO in the band of his cousin, Apostol Petkov from 1900 to 1904, with whom he participated in the Ilinden Uprising and experienced several skirmishes against Ottoman troops.

However, when the IMRO organized the public stoning of the Metropolitan of Vodena, he would come to question his future with the organization. Furthermore, he and his family were Greek Patriarchists, and as the Greeks began to organize their own struggle, he felt compelled to join. With one foot already out of the door, the rift between himself and the IMRO would further widen following an altercation in the village of Agios Loukas.

The altercation occurred when three armed Komitadjis had entered the church where Gonos Yiotas was attending Sunday liturgy and demanded that the priest be replaced with one loyal to the Exarchate. Gonos had also been armed, and following a heated exchange, the Komitadjis agreed to leave.

== Macedonian Struggle ==
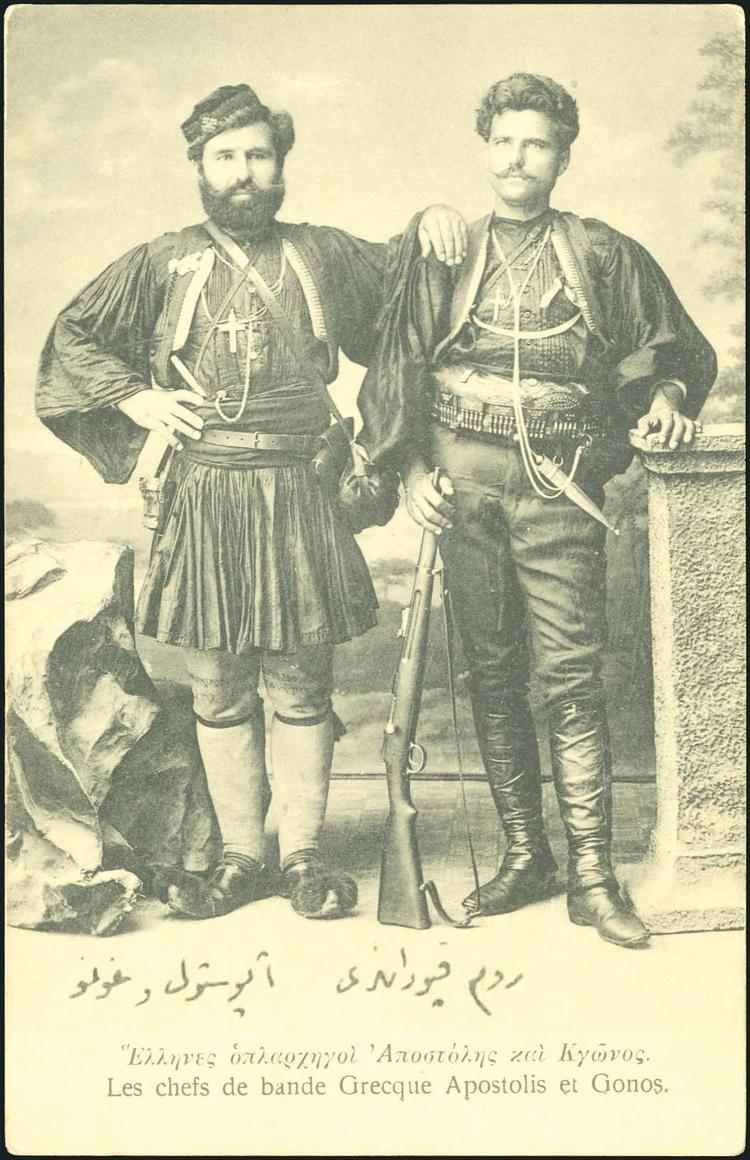
"Chiefs of Greek Band Apostolis and Gonos."

With relations soured, Gonos Yiotas deserted the IMRO and joined the Greek side in October 1904, entering the service of the Greek consulate of Thessaloniki in 1905. He was primarily active in the area of Giannitsa. He initially acted as a guide in the marshes of Lake Giannitsa where his diligence built him a reputation. Locals widely attribute his effectiveness to an immunity to mosquito bites. His presence proved irreplaceable due his knowledge of the landscape and local populations, as some Makedonomachoi were native to other parts of Greece. It was with these other Greeks that he learned the Greek language, specifically the Cretan dialect.

Gonos Yiotas was instrumental in returning 6 villages from the Bulgarian Exarchate to the allegiance of the Ecumenical Patriarchate of Constantinople and had encountered several clashes with the band of his cousin, Apostol Petkov. In March 1905, he joined the first well-organized Greek military group. The next year, he cooperated with Tellos Agras, achieving great successes. From 1908, he began to act with his own military group and at the end of the same year, he was forced to shelter in Athens.

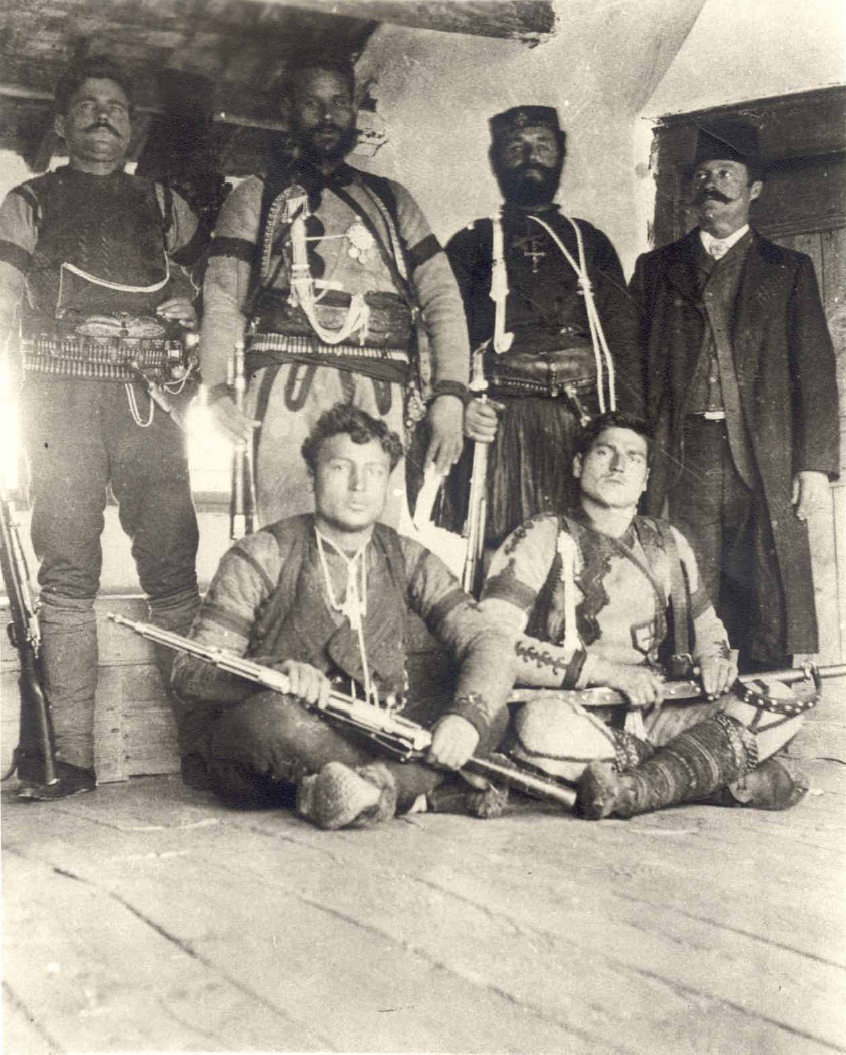
Gonos Yiotas, Lazos Dogiamas, Apostolis Matopoulos, Dr. Antonakis, and two other seated Makedonomachoi in Koulakia c. 1908

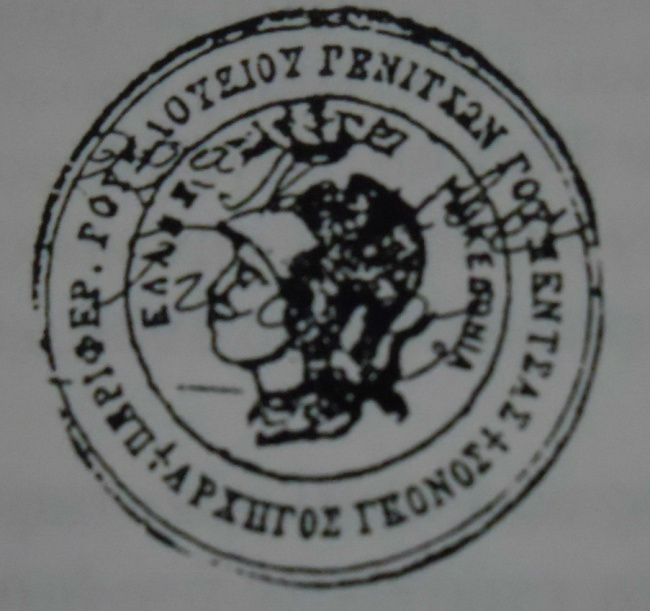
Seal of Gonos Yiotas.

== After the Young Turk Revolution ==
After the Young Turk Revolution, the Young Turks urged the arm groups of Macedonia to lay down their weapons with promise of major reform and equality and many did, however, Gonos Yiotas did not. He continued to operate around the swamps of Lake Giannitsa, but a friend of former ally Apostolis Matopoulos by the name of Dr. Antonakis collaborated with the new regime and surrendered Gonos' weapons cache in the swamp for personal gain. He issued a complaint about the betrayal to the Greek Ministry of Foreign Affairs, but it was to no avail. He took time away from his revolutionary lifestyle and went to Athens but would return to Macedonia in 1909 following a resurge in Bulgarian attacks on Greek villages. In his return to the conflict, his armed band would once again come to blows with that of his first cousin, Apostol Petkov. In November 1909, Gonos recorded 86 kills, 21 in skirmishes and 65 in ambushes.

In 1910, he and fellow chieftains Lazos Dogiamas and Athanasios Betsos grew dissatisfied with the leadership in Athens. They made their dissatisfaction obvious which resulted in the three revolutionaries being classified as robbers and pursued by Greek authorities.

== Death ==
In 1911, rumours had spread that Gonos Yiotas was angered by the actions of his former ally Apostolis Matopoulos and Dr. Antonakis and their collaboration with the Young Turks. Matopoulos was alarmed and fled the region for his safety.

Following a betrayal, Gonos Yiotas was killed on 12 February 1911, during an operation of the Ottoman army which resulted in his encirclement at the Lake of Giannitsa. It has been speculated by many that Matopoulos and/or Dr. Antonakis were responsible for the betrayal. Matopoulos would go on to flee to the United States while Dr. Antonakis would be executed for his acts of endangering the Greek cause.

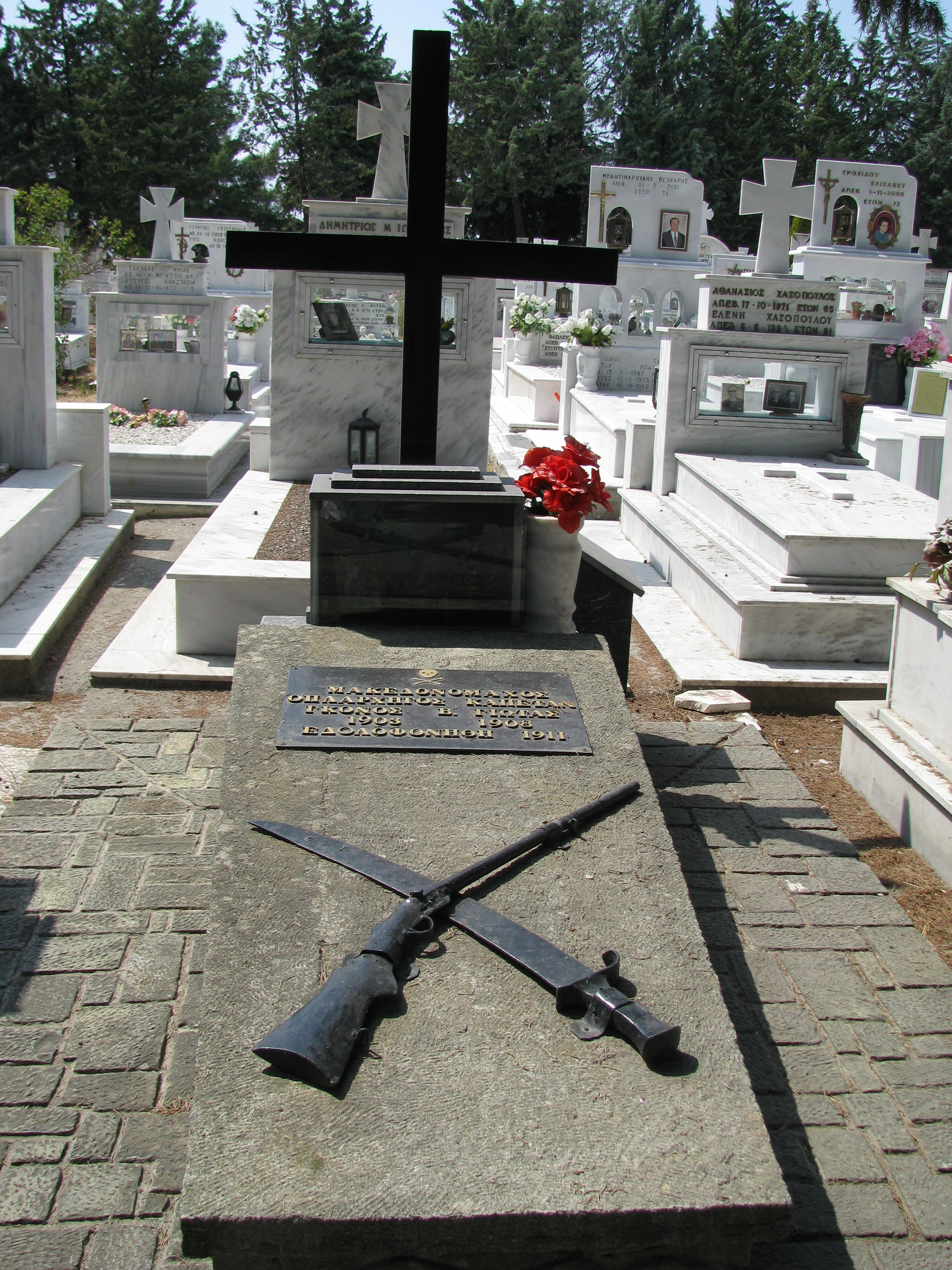
The tomb of Gonos Yiotas in Giannitsa.

Following his death, the body of Gonos Yiotas was recovered and buried in the cemetery of Giannitsa.

== Legacy ==
He is a famous Makedonomachos who is honoured as a hero of the Macedonian Struggle in Greece.

A street and square bear his name in Giannitsa, the town in which he is buried.

There are two identical busts of him, one in Vasileios Romfei Square in Thessaloniki and one in Gonou Yiota Square in Giannitsa

Some of his belongings are on display at the Folklore Museum of Giannitsa.

He is mentioned in the "Secrets of the Swamp" by the renowned Penelope Delta.

His surviving descendants live in Greece and some migrated to the USA.

== Other Images ==
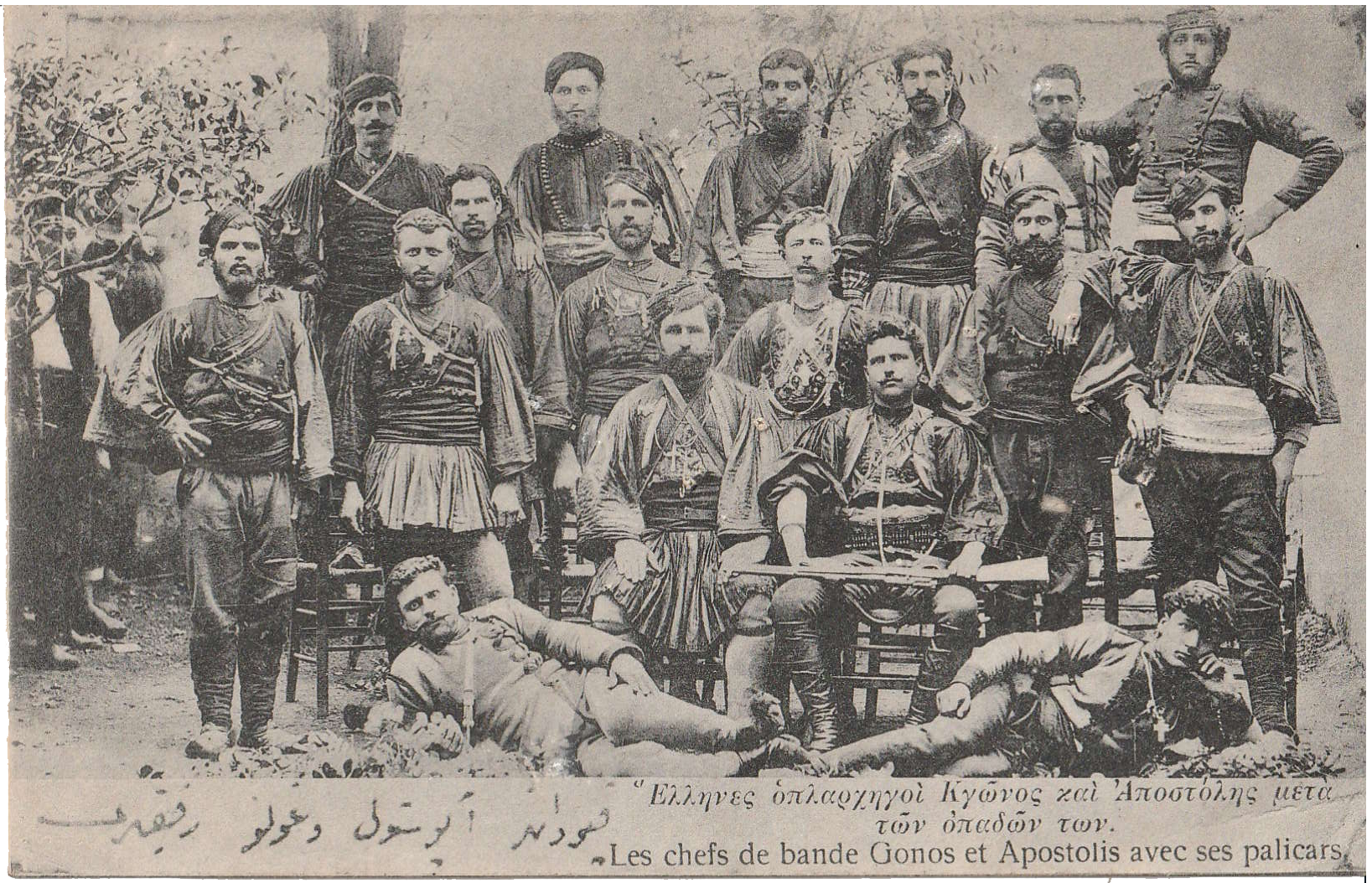
Guerilla band of Gonos Yiotas (seated right) and Apostolis Matopoulos (seated left).

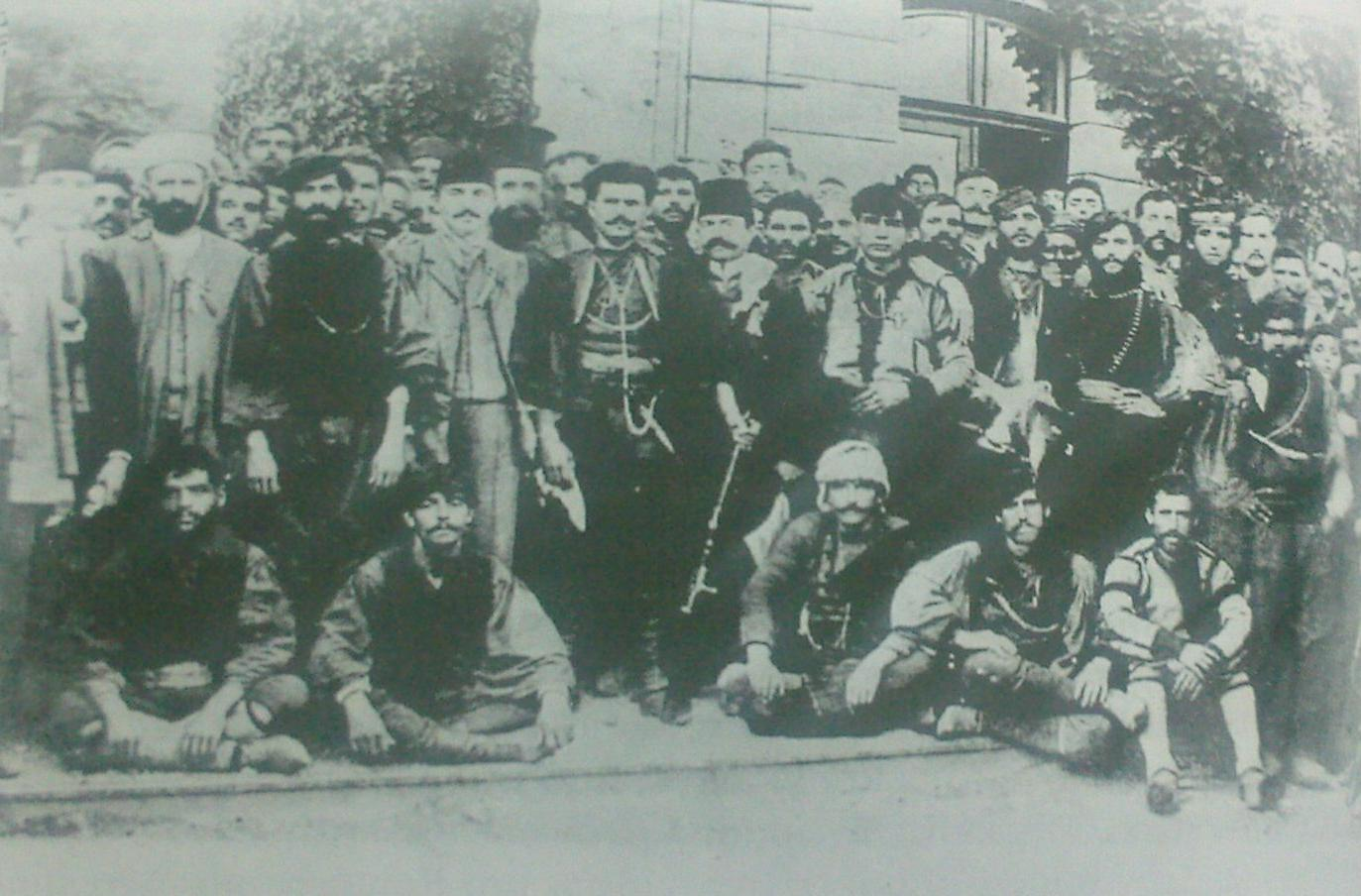
Gonos Yiotas (centre) with his supporters in Yenice-i Vardar.

== Sources ==
=== Bibliography ===
- Dakin, Douglas (1966). The Greek Struggle in Macedonia, 1897-1913. Thessaloniki: Ίδρυμα Μελετών Χερσονήσου του Αίμου/Institute for Balkan Studies.
- Καράβας, Σπύρος (2014). Μυστικά και παραμύθια από την ιστορία της Μακεδονίας. Athens: Βιβλιόραμα.
