= Komitadji =

1870s–1900s anti-Ottoman rebels in the Balkans

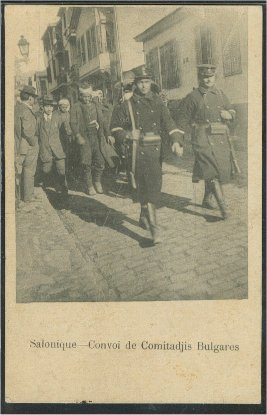
A column of Bulgarian Comitadjis captured during WWI in Thessaloniki.

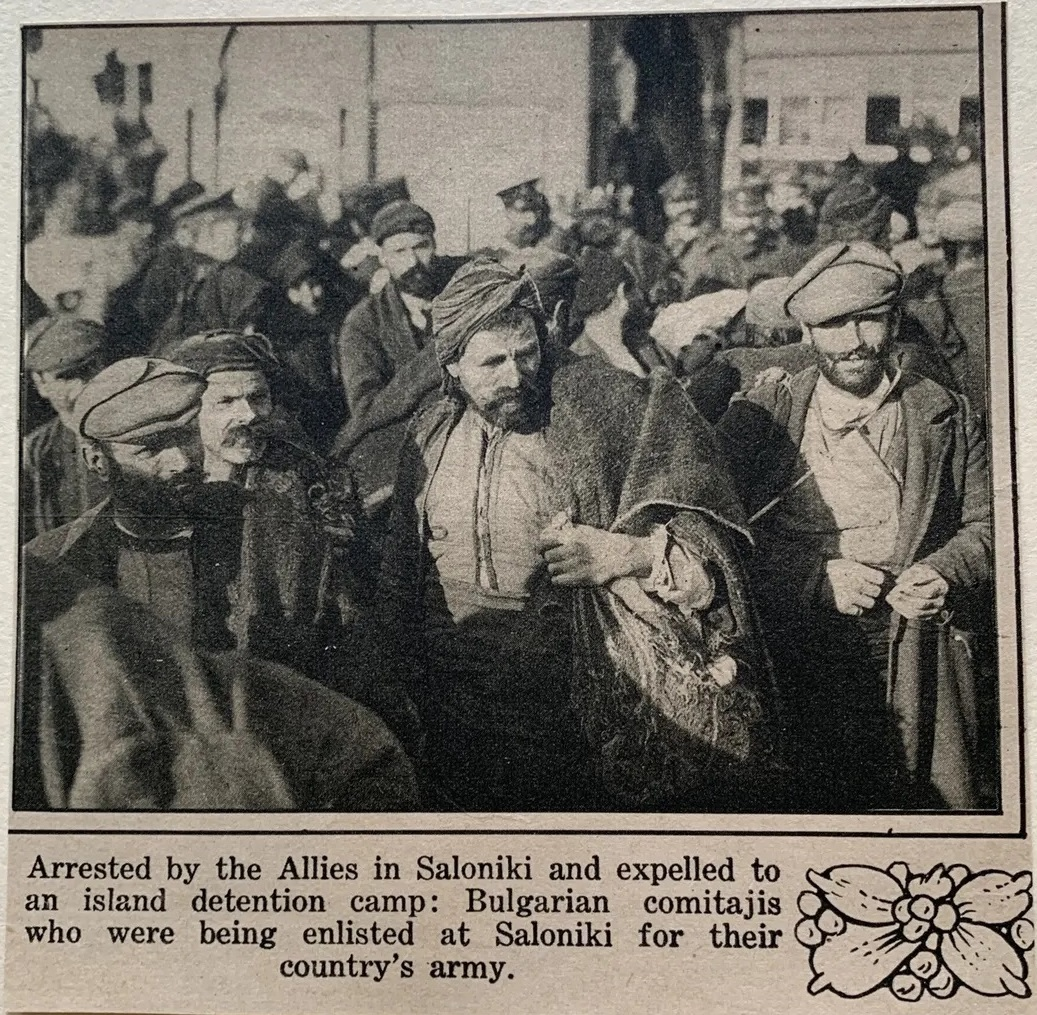
Bulgarian comitadjis arrested by the Allies during WWI in Thessaloniki.

Komitadji, Comitadji or Komita (plural Komitadjis, Comitadjis, or Komitas, Bulgarian, Macedonian and Serbian: Комити, Komiti, Romanian: Comitagiu, Greek: Κομιτατζής, plural: Κομιτατζήδες, romanized: Komitatzḗs, pl. Komitatzḗdes, from Turkish: Komitacı, Albanian: Komit) was a collective name for members of various rebel bands (chetas) operating in the Balkans during the final period of the Ottoman Empire. The name itself originates from Turkish and translates as "committee members". Komitadjis fought against the Turkish authorities and were supported by the governments of the neighbouring states, especially Bulgaria.

Komitadji was used to describe the members of the Bulgarian Revolutionary Central Committee during the April Uprising of 1876, and Bulgarian bands during the following Russo-Turkish War. The term is often employed to refer later to groups of rebels associated with the Bulgarian Macedonian-Adrianople Revolutionary Committees and the Supreme Macedonian-Adrianople Committee called by the Turks simply the Bulgarian Committees.

In interwar Greece and Yugoslavia, the term was used to refer to bands organized by the pro-Bulgarian Internal Macedonian Revolutionary Organisation and Internal Thracian Revolutionary Organisation, which operated in Vardar and Aegean Macedonia and Western Thrace. In interwar Romania, the term was used to refer to bands organized by the pro-Bulgarian Internal Dobrujan Revolutionary Organisation, which attacked the Romanian outposts and the Aromanian colonists in Southern Dobruja. During the Second World War this name was used to designate the members of the pro-Bulgarian Ohrana active in Northern Greece.

== Other uses ==
- The name of FK Vardar and RK Vardar's main ultras group is Komiti.
- Komitadji was the name given to a space-travelling warship of the Earth-based Pax Empire in the science-fiction novel Angelmass (TOR Books, 2001) by Timothy Zahn.

== See also ==
- Hajduk
- Chetnik
- Makedonomachoi
