= Athanasios Kampitis =

Athanasios (Nasos) Kampitis
- Αθανάσιος (Νάσος) Καμπίτης
- Born: late 18th century Naoussa
- Died: July 7, 1822; Veria
- Cause of death: Hanging
- Citizenship: Greece
- Known for: Battle in monastery of Metamorfosis Sotiros Battle in Dovra Revolution of Naoussa Battle in Arkochori

Athanasios (usually referred to as Nasos) Kampitis (Naoussa – Veria 1822) was a Greek klepht who was active in the area of Naoussa. He fought in the revolution of Naoussa next to military commanders such as Anastasios Karatasos, Angelis Gatsos and Zafeirakis Theodosiou. He was hanged in 1822 in Veria.

== Biography ==
There is not enough information about the life of Athanasios Kampitis, however it is known that he was the descendant of an old and well-known family in Naoussa. In fact, his relative Philippos Kampitis, who survived the disaster, fought in southern Greece and finally settled in Chalcis (Euboea), at his request to the Greek government (September 5, 1846) describes the Kampitis family as "rich" and "well-off". During the 18th century, some members of the same family were known as priests and teachers. One of them was Anastasios Kampitis, a teacher and headmaster in Naoussa, who also taught in Kastoria and Bucharest, while his father, whose first name is not preserved, wrote the "Service of St. Theophanes'' as well as and a praising epigram dedicated to Basilopoulos Balanos, published in the latter's book, Hodos Mathematikes (=Mathematical Path), Venice 1749. Although the date of birth of Athanasios Kampitis is not known, it is recorded that his family, wife and children, were taken prisoners by the Turks during the revolution of Naoussa. They were transferred under the responsibility of Zekeria aga to Veria and from there to Thessaloniki. They were subjected to horrific torture in order to convert and were probably killed. Athanasios Kampitis himself, after fighting in many battles against the Turks, was arrested and finally executed in Veria.

== Revolutionary activity ==
Most researchers agree that Athanasios Kampitis belonged to the group of the old klephts of Vermion Mt, who fought during the revolution of Naoussa on the side of Anastasios Karatasos and Zafeirakis. After the fall of the city, Kampitis, along with remnants of Naoussa’s fighters, launched raids against Turkish troops and the Muslim population of the area, according to Ottoman sources. Eventually two military groups of rebels were formed. One was led by Anastasios Karatasos acting in the mountainous area between Veria and Naoussa, while the other team was led by Athanasios Kampitis, operating in the plains of Veria and Edessa. The action of these fighters was of a vengeful nature. They committed acts of violence, killed Turks and destroyed land estates(chifliks). In fact, in a letter to Abu Lubut, they even demanded the release of the captives and threatened that if their request was not accepted, they would continue their raids. As the Turkish detachments failed to stop them, Abu Lubut Pasha issued an angry order on June 29, 1822, asking the Dervenaga Zeynel aga "to arrest the rebels alive or dead and send the severed heads to Thessaloniki". After that, Karatasos and his men headed towards southern Greece, while Kampitis, accompanied by two other rebel chiefs Kostas Malamos, Ioannis Katsaounis and 300 fighters continued the attacks against the Turks from their stronghold, the village of Dovra.

According to the records of the Islamic Court of Veria, in the beginning of July 1822, a Turkish military detachment led by Zeynel Aga and the nazir Yaya Bey attacked the positions of the rebels at the village of Dovra. A fierce battle ensued between the Turkish and Greek forces. Kampitis's team managed to escape to nearby Arkochori, where other clashes between Greeks and Turks followed for three days. The losses of both the Greeks and the Turks, leaders and soldiers, were great. Due to these losses, the Greeks were forced to take refuge in the neighboring monastery of the Transfiguration of Christ (Metamorfosis Sotiros), just outside Naoussa. There, after successive clashes, the leader of the Turks, the Turkish commander Yahya Bey and the Greek leader Malamos were killed, whereas Katsaounis with other Greek rebels managed to escape. However Nasos Kampitis was taken prisoner.

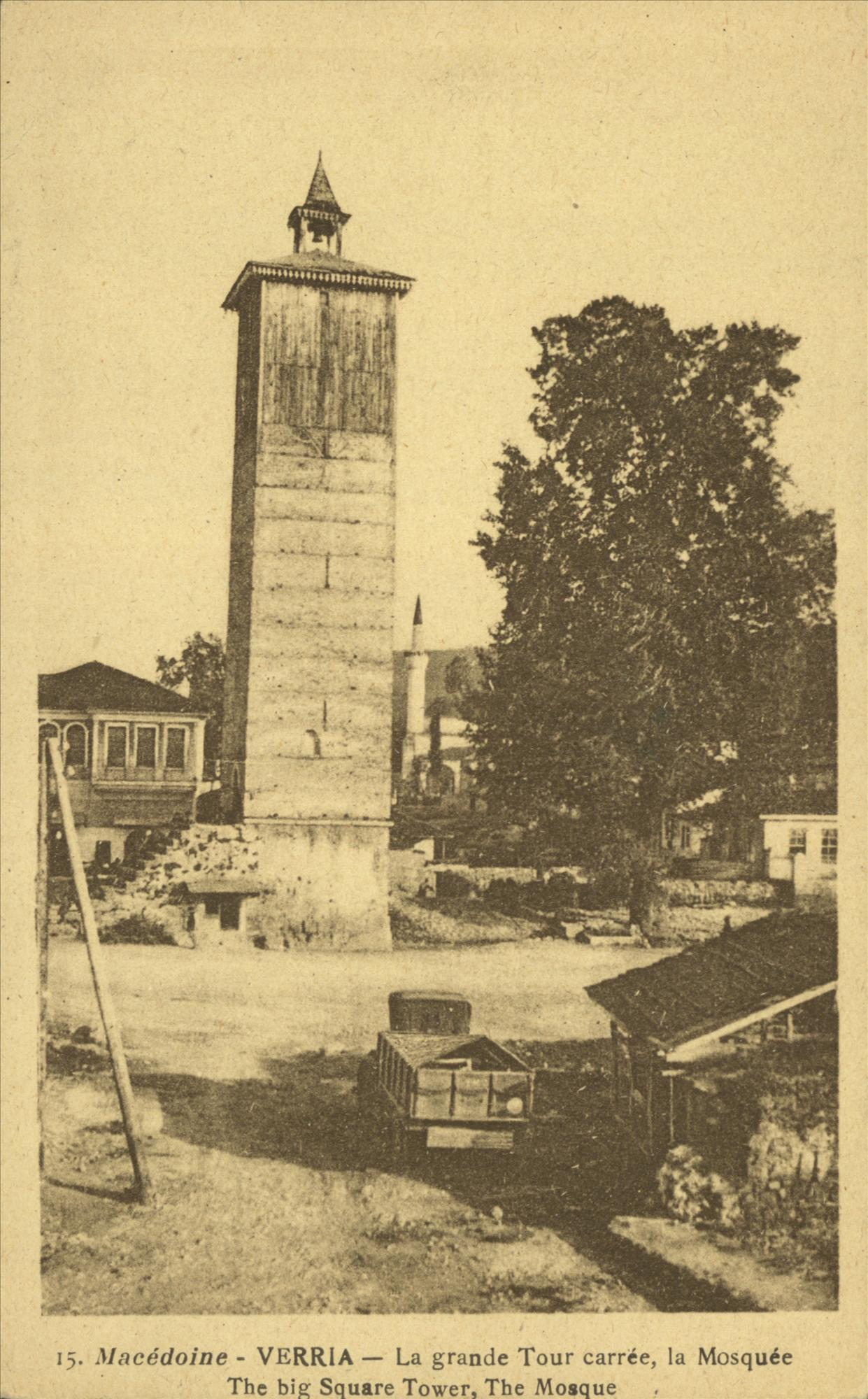
The clock and the mosque in the center of Veria and the plane tree where Athanasios Kampitis was hanged

== His ending ==
The last moments of Athanasios Kampitis are described in a report of the magistrate (kadi) of the Islamic Court of Veria Ismail Haki efendi to Lubut Pasha. According to it, Kampitis was transferred to Veria where he was tried in the court, in the presence of the mufti of Veria, the cadi of Naoussa and the prefects of Veria and Naoussa.He was the first and probably the only Greek to be formally tried for the revolution of Naoussa. At the trial, Kampitis stated, according to the Turkish source: "I am an infidel (meaning a Christian), son of an infidel and I do not recognize your prophet", while cursing the Ottomans. He was eventually sentenced to death by hanging. Thus, he was hanged on the plane tree, still standing in Horologiou Square (Townclock Sq.) in Veria, next to the courthouse, by the Ottoman officer Sherif aga. After that, the Turks cut off his head and sent it to the governor of Thessaloniki, Abu Lubut Pasha.

== Bibliography ==
- Hionidis, Georgios (1972), «Οι εις τα μητρώα των αγωνιστών του 1821 αναγραφόμενοι Μακεδόνες», Makedonika, 12, p. 34–65, https://doi.org/10.12681/makedonika.997.
- Hionidis, Georgios (1968), «Ο Όσιος Θεοφάνης ο Νέος: (ο εξ Ιωαννίνων πολιούχος της Μακεδονικής Ναούσης, η ίδρυσις της πόλεως και η καταγωγή των κατοίκων)», Makedonika, 8, p. 223–238, https://doi.org/10.12681/makedonika.306.
- Philippos Kampitis, Applications of the Greek Freedom Fighters, National Library of Greece, 1821. Digital Archive (Date accessed April 19, 2022). Application of October 16, 1846. [Φιλίππος Καμπίτης, Αιτήσεις Αγωνιστών, Εθνική Βιβλιοθήκη Ελλάδος. Ψηφιακό Αρχείο 1821. Ημερομηνία τελευταίας πρόσβασης: 19/04/2022 (αίτηση 16/10/1846).] https://1821.digitalarchive.gr/archive/show/node/10486.
- Koltsidas, Antonis, Η επανάσταση και η καταστροφή της Νάουσας κατά το 1822, Veria 2010.
- Mertzos, Nikolaos, Οι Μακεδόνες του ‘21, Thessaloniki 2015.
- Vagianos, Georgios (1993), «Παιδεία και φορείς της στη Νάουσα πριν από το 1822», Parnassos, 35, p. 156-182.
- Vasdravellis, Ioannis, Οι Μακεδόνες εις τους υπερ ανεξαρτησίας αγώνας 1796-1832, Thessaloniki 1950.
