= Naousa massacre =

1822 event during the Greek War of Independence

- Part of the Greek War of Independence
Date	13 April 1822
Location	Naoussa, Macedonia, Greece
Result	Ottoman forces capture Naoussa; Massacre of the captives; Enslavement of the local women and children

Belligerents
Greek rebels	Ottoman Empire

Commanders and leaders
Zafeirakis Theodosiou †; Anastasios Karatasos; Angelis Gatsos; Diamantis Nikolaou	Abdul Abud

Strength
4,000	19,000

Casualties and losses
409 Naoussians killed, over 400 enslaved	Unknown

The Massacre of Naoussa or Destruction of Naoussa was a bloody event of the Greek War of Independence that occurred in Naousa, Imathia on 13 April 1822.

== Events before the siege ==
Plans for the upcoming revolution had already begun in the region long before its outbreak, so the Ottomans decided to take measures to prevent it. In January 1821 the wali of Thessaloniki imprisoned members of some of the most important families of western Macedonia. Some, however, like the revolutionary leaders Anastasios Karatasos, Angelis Gatsos and Zafeirakis Theodosiou refused to surrender themselves to Ottoman authorities. After the arrests they gathered in a church and declared revolution against the Ottoman rule. This group ultimately marshaled 1,800 people to strike back at Veroia, but the attack failed when Ottoman reinforcements arrived.

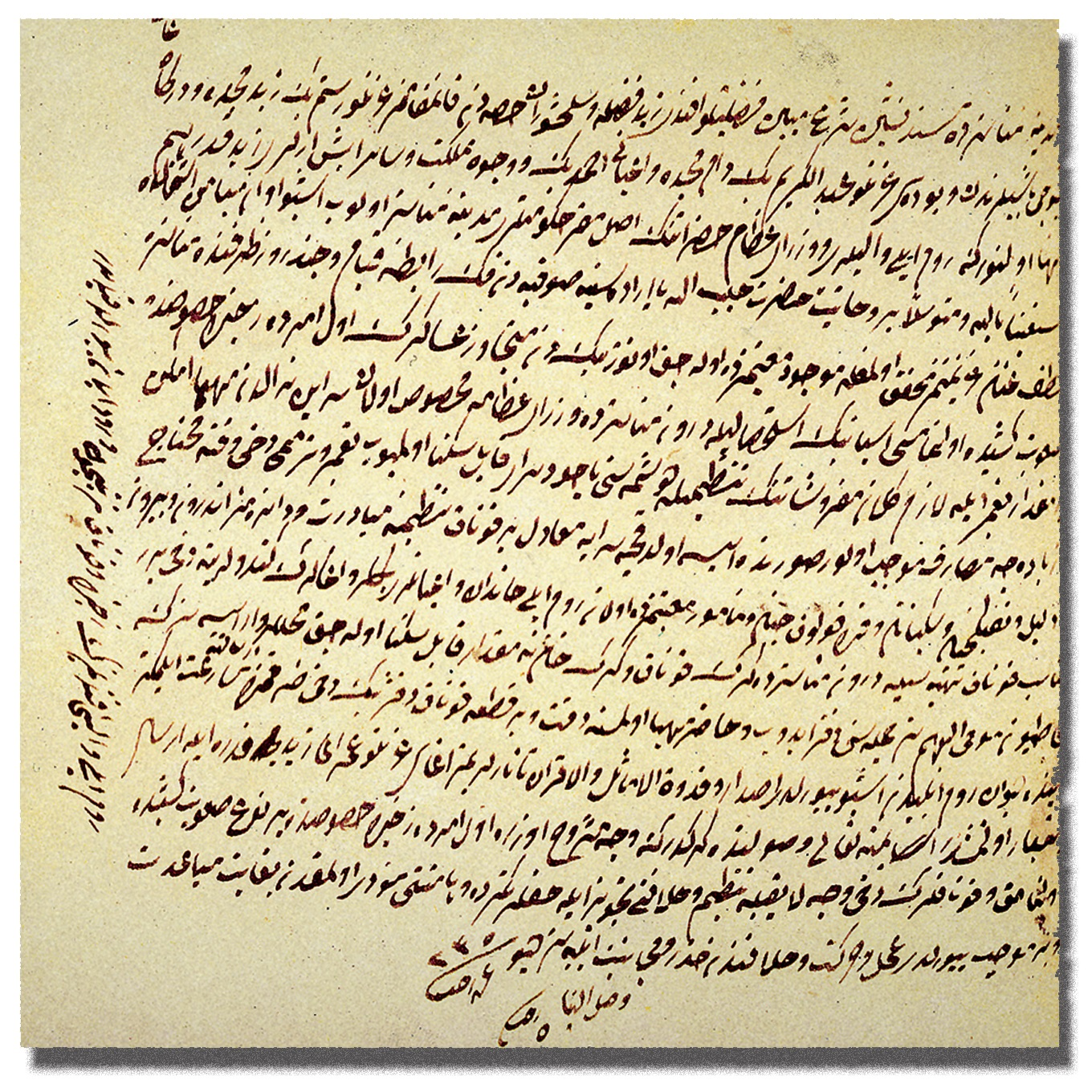
The order about Negush (Naousa) rebellion

== The siege ==
In February 1822, Naousa, despite its prosperity, took part in the Greek War of Independence. A solemn declaration of the revolution was made in the Cathedral with praise, swearing, revolutionary chants and the raising of flags on the towers and gates of the city. Military operations led by Zafeirakis Theodosiou and Anastasios Karatasos, aiming at the creation of a free revolutionary regime in the region, led to the siege of the city. Abdul Abud, the Pasha of Thessaloniki, arrived on 14 March with 16,000 soldiers and 12 cannons. The Greeks defended Naousa with a force of 4,000 men. The Ottomans attempted to take the city on 16, 18, and 19 March, without success; on 24 March, they started a bombardment lasting for several days. Their attack failed, but on 6 April, after receiving a reinforcement of additional 3,000 men, they finally overcame the Greek resistance and entered Naousa. A complete destruction of the city, looting, massacres and persecutions of the population followed. Several women preferred to kill themselves by falling with their children into the foamy waters of the Arapitsa waterfall in the Stubanoi site in order to avoid being captured. According to official Ottoman documents, 409 Naousians were killed, 33 left the city, and 198 were pardoned. Over 400 women and children were sold as slaves. The properties of the dead and fugitives (655 houses) and the church were confiscated. The fall and the massacre of Naousa marked the end of the Greek Revolution in Central Macedonia. After this catastrophe, the city lost its privileges for the next few years. Many Naousians went to southern Greece, where they continued the struggle in the frame of the Greek War of Independence.

== Commemoration ==
In 1955, a royal decree designated Naousa as a "heroic city" and since then the official name of the municipality of Naousa has been "The Heroic City of Naousa", honoring the struggle of its inhabitants during the Greek War of Independence. A monument at the Stoubanoi area, near the river Arapista, commemorates the sacrifice of the women who, in April 1822, preferred death instead of being captured by the Ottomans, and jumped into this river with their children.

== See also ==
- Emmanouel Pappas
- Nikolaos Kasomoulis
- Chios massacre
- Third siege of Missolonghi
- Macedonian Greeks
- Souliotes
