= Nikolaos Kasomoulis =

Participant of the Greek Revolution and historian

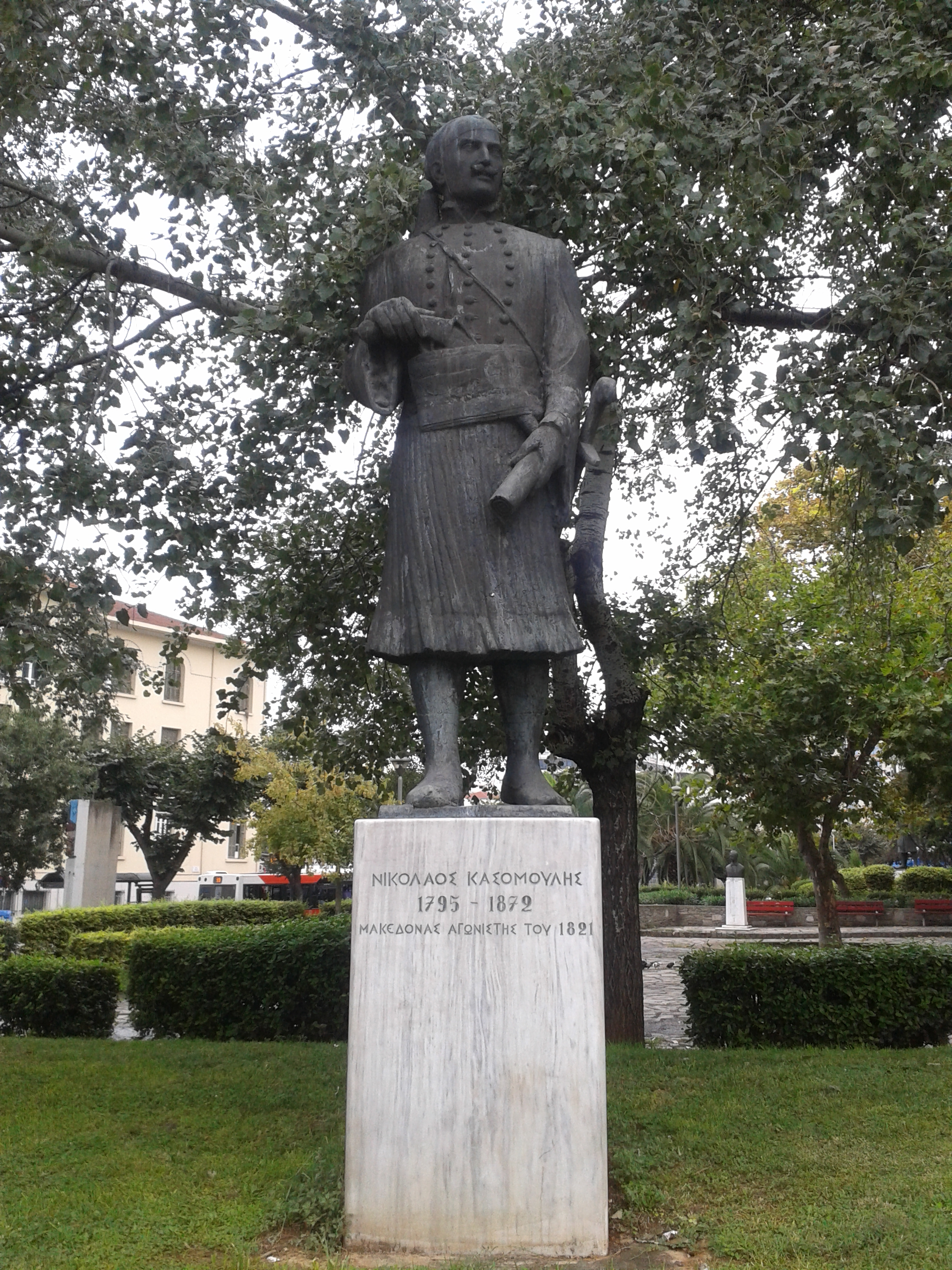
- Statue of Kasomoulis in Thessaloniki
- Born: c. 1795; Pisoderi or Kozani
- Died: 1872; Stylida
- Father: Kostantinos Kasomoulis

Nikolaos Kasomoulis (Greek: Νικόλαος Κασομούλης; c. 1795 – 1872) was a Macedonian Greek revolutionary in the Greek Revolution of 1821, and one of the main historical sources about it.

== Biography ==
He was of Aromanian origin. Kasomoulis was born either in the village of Pisoderi, whence his family hailed, or in Kozani, and grew up in Siatista. His father Konstantinos was a merchant. As a youth, Nikolaos moved to Serres to expand the family business. There, in 1820, he joined the Filiki Etaireia.

Following the outbreak of the Greek War of Independence, Kasomoulis took part in the uprising in the region of Mount Olympus and Chalkidiki, where he co-operated with the chieftain Diamantis Nikolaou. His father, who in the meantime had moved to Naoussa, was killed there during the sack of the town by the Ottomans in April 1822. Following the suppression of the revolution in Macedonia, Kasomoulis went to Thessaly with a band of men from Siatista, where he joined the forces of Nikolaos Stournaris and Georgios Karaiskakis. In 1826 he took part in the Third Siege of Missolonghi, along with his brothers Dimitrios and Georgios. He composed the written decision for attempting a final sortie, and was responsible for coordinating the actions of the various detachments participating in the sortie. During the sortie, his brother Dimitrios was mortally wounded.

Kasomoulis occupied various military positions under Governor Ioannis Kapodistrias and King Otto. In 1836, he participated in the suppression of the anti-Otto uprisings, during which his other brother, Georgios, was also killed. He received the rank of Colonel in the Royal Phalanx, but is commonly known as a general, a rank he never held. At an advanced age he settled in Stylida, where he died in 1872.

== Memoirs ==
Kasomoulis is best known for his memoirs («Ενθυμήματα στρατιωτικά της Επαναστάσεως των Ελλήνων 1821-1833», "Military Memoirs of the Revolution of the Greeks 1821-1833"), originally written in 1832, and completed in 1842. In 1861, Kasomoulis completed them with a history of the Armatoloi, marking the first attempt at a comprehensive treatment of the Greek Revolution and its historical causes. As a historical source, Kasomoulis' memoirs rank among the most important works for the study of the Greek Revolution.
