= Naousa =

Naousa or Naoussa may refer to:

- Naousa, Imathia, a town in Imathia, Macedonia, Greece
  - Naousa massacre, 1822
  - Naoussa F.C., a football club
- Naousa, Paros, a village on the island of Paros, in the Cyclades, Greece
