= Vassilios Romfeis =

Vassilios Romfeis (Greek: Βασίλειος Ρομφέης) was a Greek klepht. He was born in Naousa, Imathia in about 1773. He became the main klepht in mount Vermio. In 1795, Ali Pasha, who had established an autonomous pashalik in Ioannina, tried to seize Naousa. That led kapetan Romfeis and his lieutenant Anastasios Karatasos to defend the town, which then enjoyed a status of semi-autonomy within the Ottoman Empire. From 1795 to 1804 Ali Pasha's troops fought to enter Naousa; Romfeis and his troops defended the besieged town for five months until, after a final battle, they were defeated and forced to leave. Romfeis found shelter in Thessaloniki, while his wife, son and daughter were imprisoned and transferred to Ioannina. Romfeis made extensive efforts to liberate his family, with no result. He finally became a monk in Agion Oros, where in later life he lost his sanity.
