= Zisis Karademos =

Greek armatolos

Zisis Karademos (Greek: Ζήσης Καραδήμος) was a Greek armatolos who led an uprising in Naousa in western Macedonia in 1705.

In 1705, a commissar of the Ottoman Sultan named Ahmet Çelebi came to Naousa to select fifty male children for the devşirme conscription, to be raised as Janissaries. His arrival sparked a revolt in the town led by Zisis Karademos, his two sons and his band of armatoloi. Ahmet Çelebi and his entourage were slain. Karademos and about one hundred of his followers were subsequently attacked by a Turkish force led by the Bolukbashi Recep Aga near the river Arapitsa in the vicinity of Naousa. The rebels retreated towards the top of Mt Vermion and fled when Zisis Karademos was killed. Six of his followers, amongst them his two sons, were taken prisoner and were later hanged after a trial in Veria. Family members of the rebels were arrested (40 men and 29 women) and were imprisoned in Thessaloniki. Putting down the rebellion cost the Ottoman purse 74,387 golden coins, according to a Turkish source.
