= Folklore Museum of the Lyceum of Hellenic Women =

Museum in Naoussa, Central Macedonia, Greece

Coordinates: 40.6303°N 22.0726°E

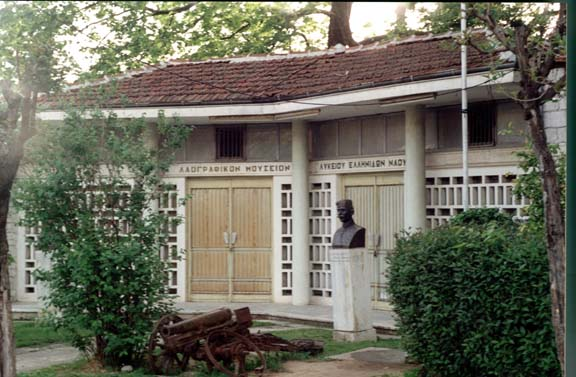
Outside View

The Folklore Museum is located in Naoussa, Central Macedonia, Greece. It was founded in 1968 by the Lyceum of Hellenic Women with the aim of saving and preserving the customs of Naoussa and the surrounding area. The premises were supplied by the Municipality of Naoussa in the park near the entrance to the town.

Inside there are a reconstruction of a traditional sitting-room, a domestic loom, clothing, leather trunks with metal studs, an entire loom complete with all its appurtenances, authentic local costumes, the authentic uniform of a Macedonian freedom fighter, and weapons of great value (most notably a Turkish one engraved with a crescent), many woven textiles, and embroidered wall hangings and floor coverings.

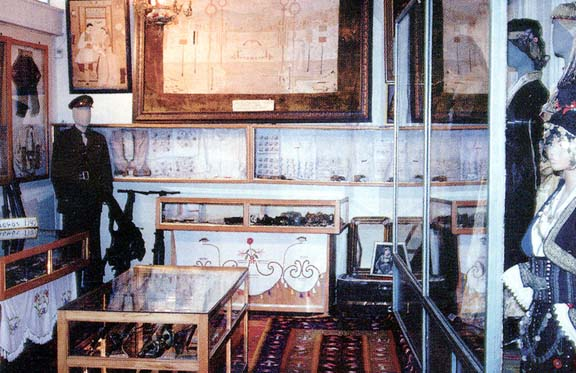
Interior View

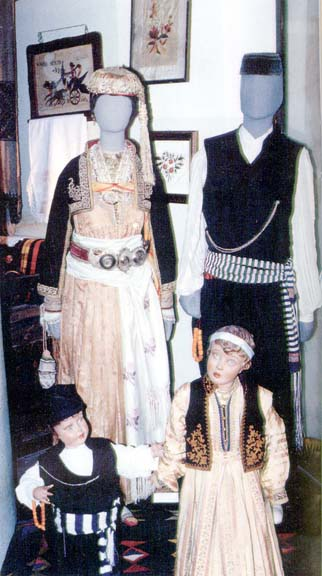
Traditional costumes

== Sources ==
- This article incorporates text from the corresponding article at the Museums of Macedonia website, commissioned by the Macedonian Heritage foundation, written by Vlasis Vlasidis, and published under a CC-BY-SA-3.0 license.
