= Ioannis Simanikas =

Greek chieftain

Kapetan (Chieftain) Ioannis Simanikas
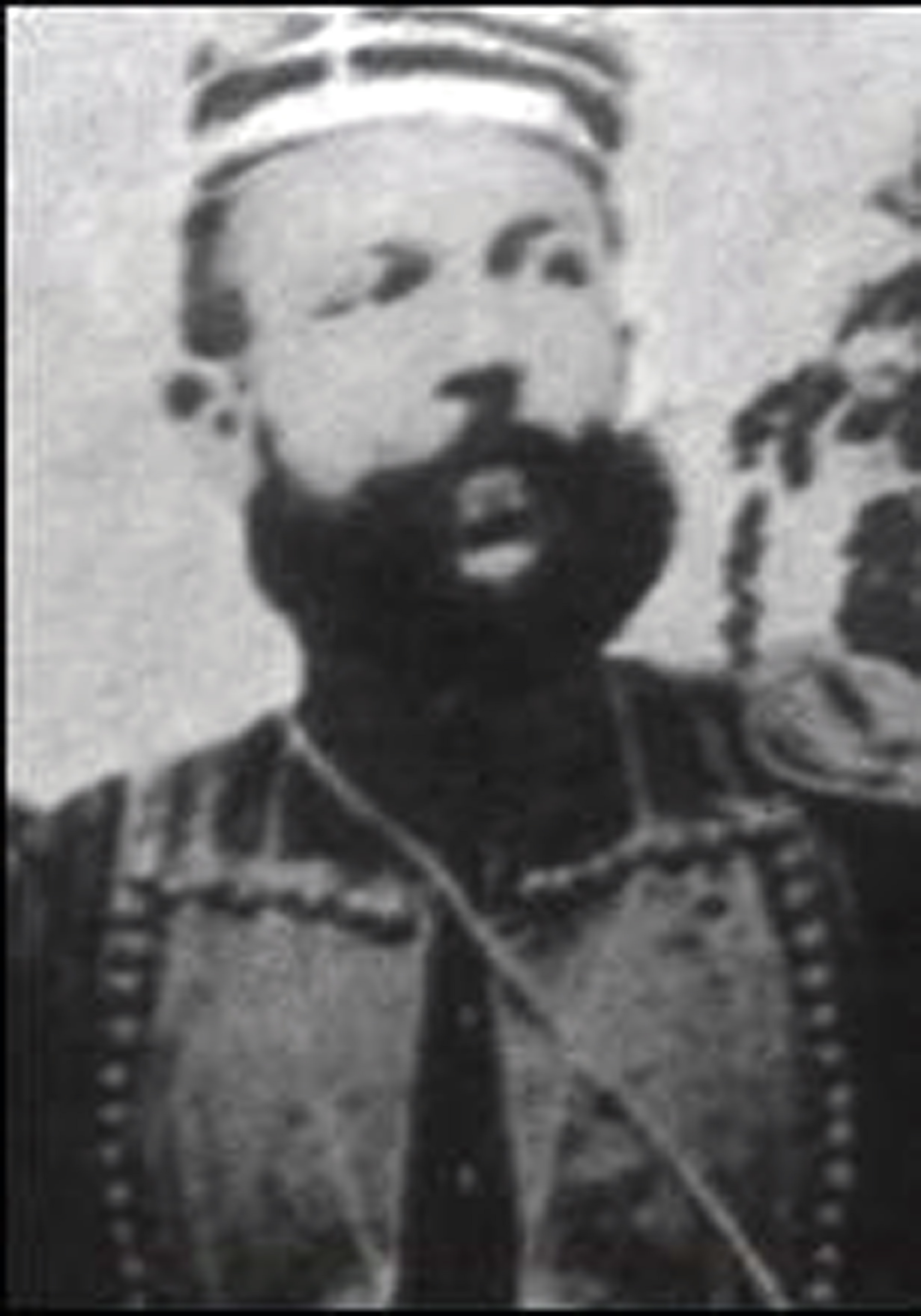
- Ioannis Simanikas during the Macedonian Struggle.
- Native name: Ιωάννης Σημανίκας
- Born: Late 1800s Naousa, Salonika Vilayet, Ottoman Empire (now Greece)
- Allegiance: Kingdom of Greece
- Service / branch: HMC; Hellenic Army
- Battles / wars: Macedonian Struggle; Balkan Wars: First Balkan War; Second Balkan War

Ioannis Simanikas (Greek: Ιωάννης Σημανίκας) was a Greek chieftain of the Macedonian Struggle.

== Biography ==
Simanikas was born in Naousa of Imathia in the late 19th century. He firstly collaborated with the Ethniki Etaireia and then with the Macedonian Committee. Simanikas was a close associate of Dimitrios Kalapothakis, who proposed to him in August 1904 to serve under the orders of Efthymios Kaoudis, who was acting in regions of Prespa and Florina. Later, leader of his own armed group, he firstly acted in Florina against the Bulgarian komitadjis Mitro Vlachos and Athanas Karsakov, where he was distinguished for his boldness and courage. Later he collaborated with Georgios Katechakis in several operations. In 1906 he acted in the area of Imathia, as the former forces there were weakened. After the revolution of the Young Turks he was forced to flee to Athens for safety reasons. During the First Balkan War he participated as a leader of his own team and he became one of the liberators of his hometown, Naousa.

== Sources ==
- Γεώργιος Πετσίβας (editor), Ιωάννη Καραβίτη, Ο Μακεδονικός Αγών, Athens 1994, Vol. I, p. 136, 160.
- Ιωάννης Σημανίκας, Η δράσις του οπλαρχηγού εκ Ναούσης Ιωάννου Σημανίκα κατά τον Μακεδονικό Αγώνα, Μακεδονικός Αγών, Vol. 15 (1930), p. 15-16
- John S. Koliopoulos (editor), Αφανείς, γηγενείς Μακεδονομάχοι, Εταιρεία Μακεδονικών Σπουδών, University Studio Press, Thessaloniki, 2008, p. 38
- Ο Αγών εις την Κεντρικήν και Ανατολικήν Μακεδονία, Πηγή: Ο Μακεδονικός Αγών και τα εις Θράκην γεγονότα, ΓΕΣ, 1979
