= Diamantis Nikolaou =

- Διαμαντής Νικολάου
- Born: Adamantios Olympios Nikolaou c. 1790; Ryakia, Greece
- Died: 19 January 1856
- Other names: Captain Diamantis
- Father: Nikolaos Kateriniotis Olympios

Adamantios Olympios Nikolaou (Greek: Αδαμάντιος Ολύμπιος Νικολάου; c. 1790 – 19 January 1856), better known as Captain Diamantis (Greek: Καπετάν Διαμαντής), was a Greek klepht and an armatolos from Pieria.

== Biography ==
Born in Ryakia, Diamantis Nikolaou Olympian was the eldest son of the great armatolos and klepht Raideniotis (Ryakiotis) Olympios, best known as Nikolas Kateriniotis Olympios. He operated in the mountains of Vermio, Olympus and Pieria before 1821 and after the outbreak of the Revolution. The interim government and the Supreme Court because of his bravery and military skill appointed him commander of Evia and Eastern Greece. He successfully confronted the Turks in Evia and in the battle of Faucets. In 1829, as shown in the paroikoi Skopelos records (2 April 1829) he was with his family on the island of Skopelos. In July 1829 he represented Thessalomakedones fighters in the Fourth National Assembly at Argos and offers to Kapodistrias their proxy. By decision of King Otto, he was appointed senator on 16 June 1844 in the Senate body.
