= Zafeirakis Theodosiou =

Zafeirakis Theodosiou (Greek: Ζαφειράκης Θεοδοσίου) (1772 - 1822) was a Greek prokritos (πρόκριτος), meaning political leader of Greeks during Ottoman rule, of Naousa, Imathia and an important figure of the Greek War of Independence in the region of Macedonia.

== Life ==
Zafeirakis was born in Naousa, Imathia originating from a wealthy family that gave him the opportunity to educate himself to the most important institutions of his time. He studied at Ioannina where he spent most of his youth. At that time, Ali Pasha was ruling the area and valuing Zafeirakis' skills took him under his protection and later appointed him to administrate Naoussa when he extended his influence to Central Macedonia.

But Zafeirakis quickly opposed Ali Pasha's authoritative administration. As a result, Ali Pasha turned against him and he was forced to abandon his place for Thessaloniki and later Mount Athos and Constantinople. There he was associated with Ottoman authorities and twelve years later he managed to receive an order from the Sultan to return to his previous command to Naussa where he stayed until his death.

He became very popular to his fellow citizens by promoting local manufactures, especially those that had to do with weaponry, building schools, churches and road construction. Around 1820 he was introduced into Filiki Eteria and came close with Anastasios Karatasos and Aggelis Gatsos, assigning them to protect his area. He personally organised the liberation of Naoussa on February 19, 1822, becoming one of the first liberated cities in Macedonia during the Revolution. However, in April the Pasha of Thessaloniki himself besieged Naoussa with 18,000 men and two weeks later he managed to regain control over the city. Zafeirakis and his family lost their lives during the following pillage.

== See also ==
- Anastasios Karatasos
- Aggelis Gatsos
- Greek War of Independence
- List of Macedonians (Greek)
