= Anastasios Karatasos =

Greek military commander (1764–1830)

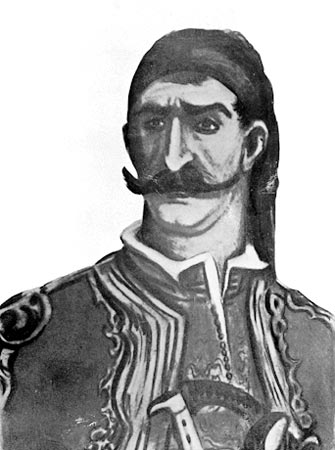

Anastasios Karatasos (Greek: Αναστάσιος Καρατάσος; 1764 – 21 January 1830) was a Greek military commander during the Greek War of Independence was born in the village of Dovras (Δοβράς or Δορβρά), Imathia and is considered to be the most important revolutionary from Macedonia.

== Klephtis and Greek War of Independence ==
Karatasos became a Klepht at the age of eighteen and became quite famous for his actions in the Olympus area before he joined the Revolution. In 1804, with the Armatolos Vassilios Romfeis, he defended Naoussa from the attacking forces of Ali Pasha, but he didn't manage to save the city, that was captured five months later. In March 1821, when Emmanouel Pappas started the Revolution in Chalkidiki, he collaborated with him trying to spread it through the entire region, but their actions were not well coordinated. Large numbers of Ottoman forces from Thessaloniki were able to defeat the Greek revolutionary forces, and Emmanuel Pappas was retired to Mount Athos. He returned to Naoussa which was liberated from Ottomans on February 19, 1822, under the leadership of Zafeirakis Theodosiou.

In April 1822, the Pasha of Thessaloniki, Abdul Abut with 18,000 men besieged Naoussa, and, fourteen days later, he captured and destroyed the city. Karatasos was responsible for the defence, and he managed to save himself and his family, escaping from the burned town. He continued the Revolution in Macedonia, and, later in 1823, he trapped and destroyed a two thousand men corps of Janissaries in the Mpampa Bridge at Pineios.

== Descent to South Greece ==
Also in 1823 with the Klepht Aggelis Gatsos and their bands, they crossed Mount Olympus and he collaborated with Georgios Karaiskakis at Agrafa, and Mesologgi, while he fought at the Battle of Peta and performed guerilla operations in Thessaly. In his letters to the Revolutionary movement he complained about the lack of supplies for his band, although he fought in numerous battles at Nafplio, Souli, Skiathos, Karystos, Trikeri, Messinia and performed operations together with Markos Botsaris, Giorgakis Olympios, Odysseas Androutsos, Manto Mavrogenous, Andreas Vokos Miaoulis, Ioannis Kolettis and others. Anastasios Karatasos died at the age of 66 on January 22, 1830, at Nafpaktos where he was buried with honours. His statue lies at the central square of Veroia, built by the sculptor Dimitrios Chatzis.

== See also ==
- Dimitrios Karatasos
- List of Macedonians (Greek)
