= Angelis Gatsos =

Commander of the Greek War of Independence

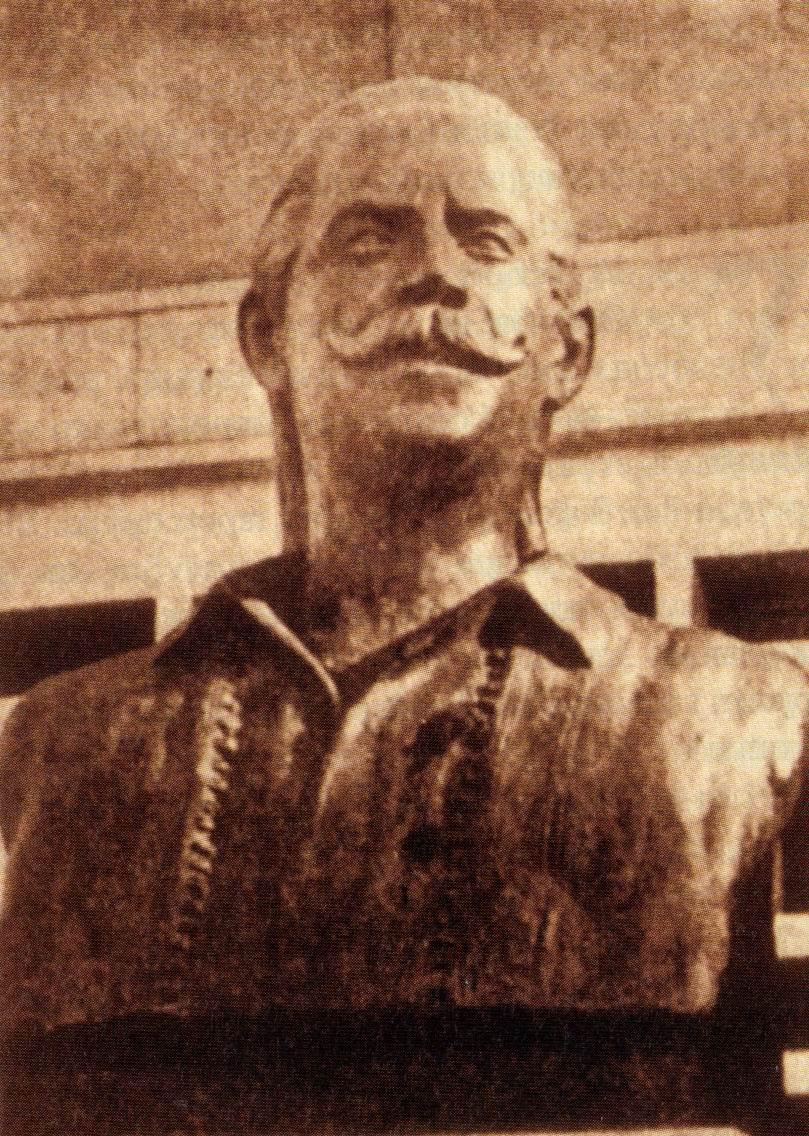

Angelis Gatsos (Greek: Αγγελής Γάτσος; Bulgarian: Ангел Гацов) (1771–1839) was a Slavophone Greek military commander during the Greek War of Independence. He was born in the village of Sarakinovo, today known as Sarakinoi (Almopia municipality, Pella regional unit).

Despite Gatsos' Bulgarian origin, in the first half of the 19th century, the religion was the key factor of identification of the local communities in the Ottoman Empire, while yet united Orthodox fraternity, espoused pro-Greek sentiments. He played an important role during the Greek War of Independence, not only in Macedonia, but also in Central Greece. He joined the klepht bands of Central Macedonia at the age of 20 and played a leading role during the liberation of Naousa from the Ottomans in February 1822. After the city was destroyed by the Ottoman Army, he escaped with Anastasios Karatasos to southern Greece where he took part in many battles of the Revolution. In 1826 he went to Euboea, where he created his own band and participated in the battle of Atalanti Island. After the creation of the independent Greek State, he joined the army and died in Chalkida with the rank of colonel in 1839.

== See also ==
- Greek War of Independence
- List of Macedonians (Greek)
