= Dovras =

Dovras Δοβράς
- Municipal unit
- Location within the regional unit

- Location within Greece
- Coordinates: 40°36′N 22°12′E
- Country: Greece
- Administrative region: Central Macedonia
- Regional unit: Imathia
- Municipality: Veroia

Area
  - Municipal unit: 104.1 km^{2} (40.2 sq mi)

Population (2021)
  - Municipal unit: 4,388
  - Municipal unit density: 42.15/km^{2} (109.2/sq mi)
- Time zone: UTC+2 (EET)
  - Summer (DST): UTC+3 (EEST)
- Vehicle registration: ΗΜ

Dovras (Greek: Δοβράς) is a former municipality in Imathia, Greece. Its name comes from the Slavic Dobra meaning "Good". Since the 2011 local government reform it is part of the municipality Veroia, of which it is a municipal unit. In 2021 its population was 4,388. Its area is 104.123 km^{2}. The seat of the municipality was in Agios Georgios. The municipality was created at the 1997 Kapodistrias reform. The road from Veroia to Edessa runs through Dovras. Its main industry is agriculture especially its peach production. In the post-civil war time, there were built houses for young victims of the civil war by the Swiss, as well as founded manufacturies for vocational training (apprenticeship).

== Subdivisions ==
The municipal unit Dovras is subdivided into the following communities (constituent villages in brackets):

- Agios Georgios, named Giannissa until 1940
- Agia Marina
- Patrida (Patrida, Kali Panagia)
- Trilofo
- Fyteia (Fyteia, Agios Nikolaos, Kostochori, Lianovrochi)
