= Naousa, Imathia =

City in Macedonia, Greece

Naousa Νάουσα
- Municipality
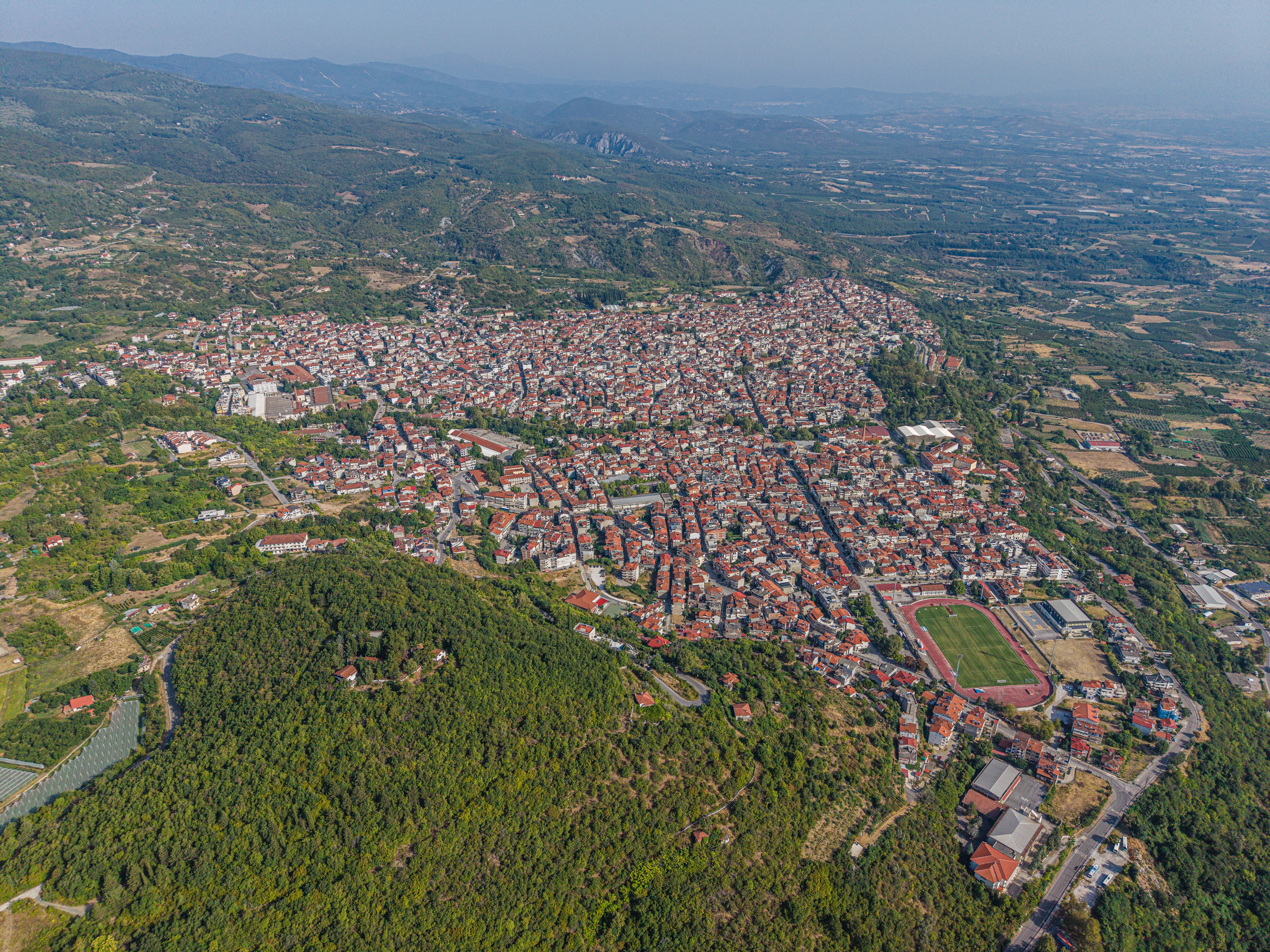
- Naousa

- Seal

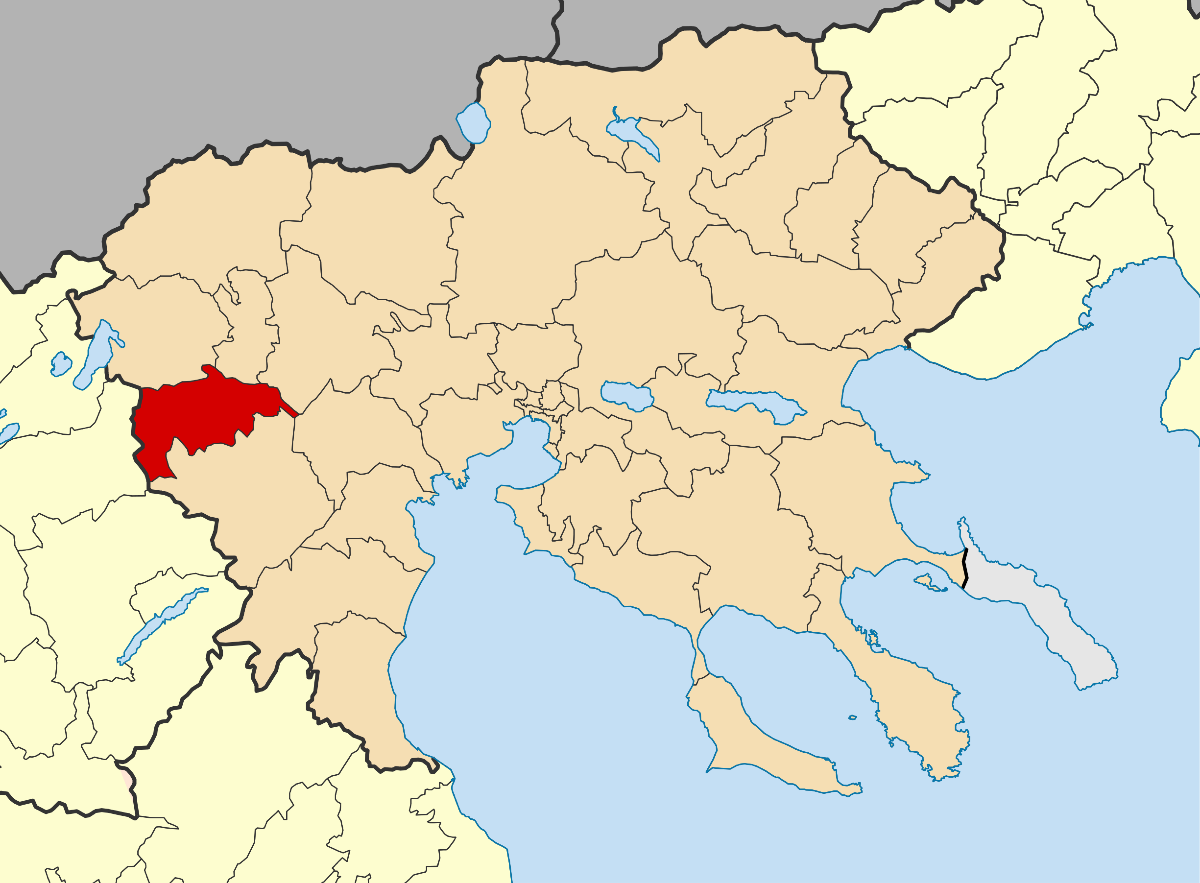
- Location within the region

- Location within Greece
- Coordinates: 40°38′N 22°4′E
- Country: Greece
- Administrative region: Central Macedonia
- Regional unit: Imathia

Area
  - Municipality: 425.5 km^{2} (164.3 sq mi)
  - Municipal unit: 300.9 km^{2} (116.2 sq mi)
- Elevation: 330–480 m (1,080–1,570 ft)

Population (2021)
  - Municipality: 30,054
  - Density: 70.63/km^{2} (182.9/sq mi)
  - Municipal unit: 19,706
  - Municipal unit density: 65.49/km^{2} (169.6/sq mi)
- Time zone: UTC+2 (EET)
  - Summer (DST): UTC+3 (EEST)
- Postal code: 592 00
- Area code: 23320
- Vehicle registration: ΗΜ
- Website: www.naoussa.gr

Naousa (Greek: Νάουσα, historically Νάουσσα, Naoussa; Aromanian: Naustã) is a city in the Imathia regional unit of Central Macedonia, Greece. It is located at the foot of the Vermio Mountains. According to the 2021 census, the city population was 19,706 inhabitants and that of the homonymous metropolitan area 30,054 inhabitants.

In 1955, a royal decree designated Naousa as a heroic city and since then the official name of the municipality of Naousa has been The Heroic City of Naousa, honoring the struggle of its inhabitants during the Greek War of Independence. A monument at the Stoubanoi area, near the river Arapista, commemorates the sacrifice of the women who, in April 1822, preferred death instead of being captured by the Ottomans, and jumped into this river with their children.

Naousa is famous for its carnival its ski resort and its wine production, as well as for the archaeological sites discovered at the area of ancient Mieza. Since 2021, it is a member of the European Institute of Cultural Routes.

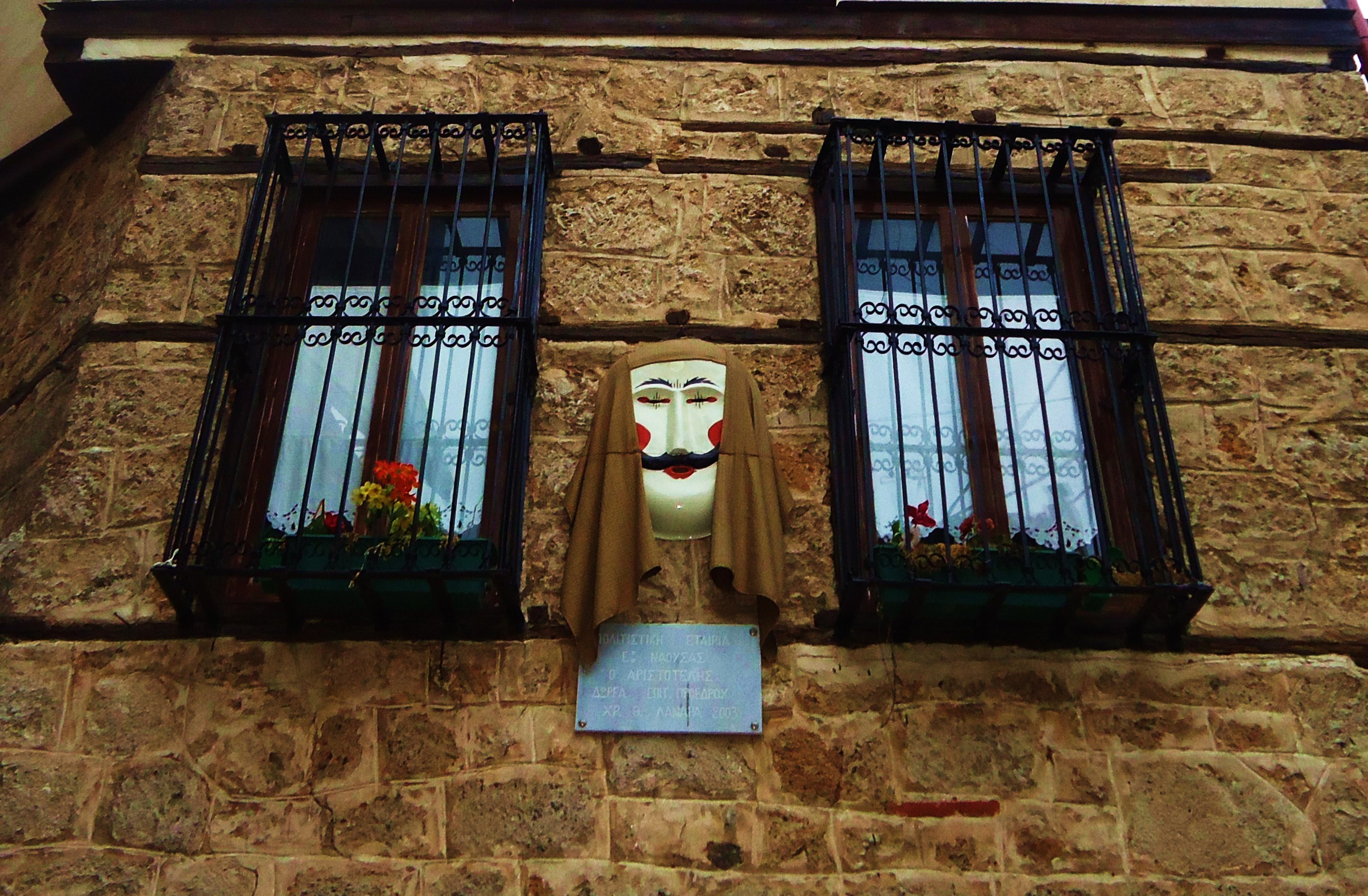
Genitsaros in the traditional Mougri Mansion

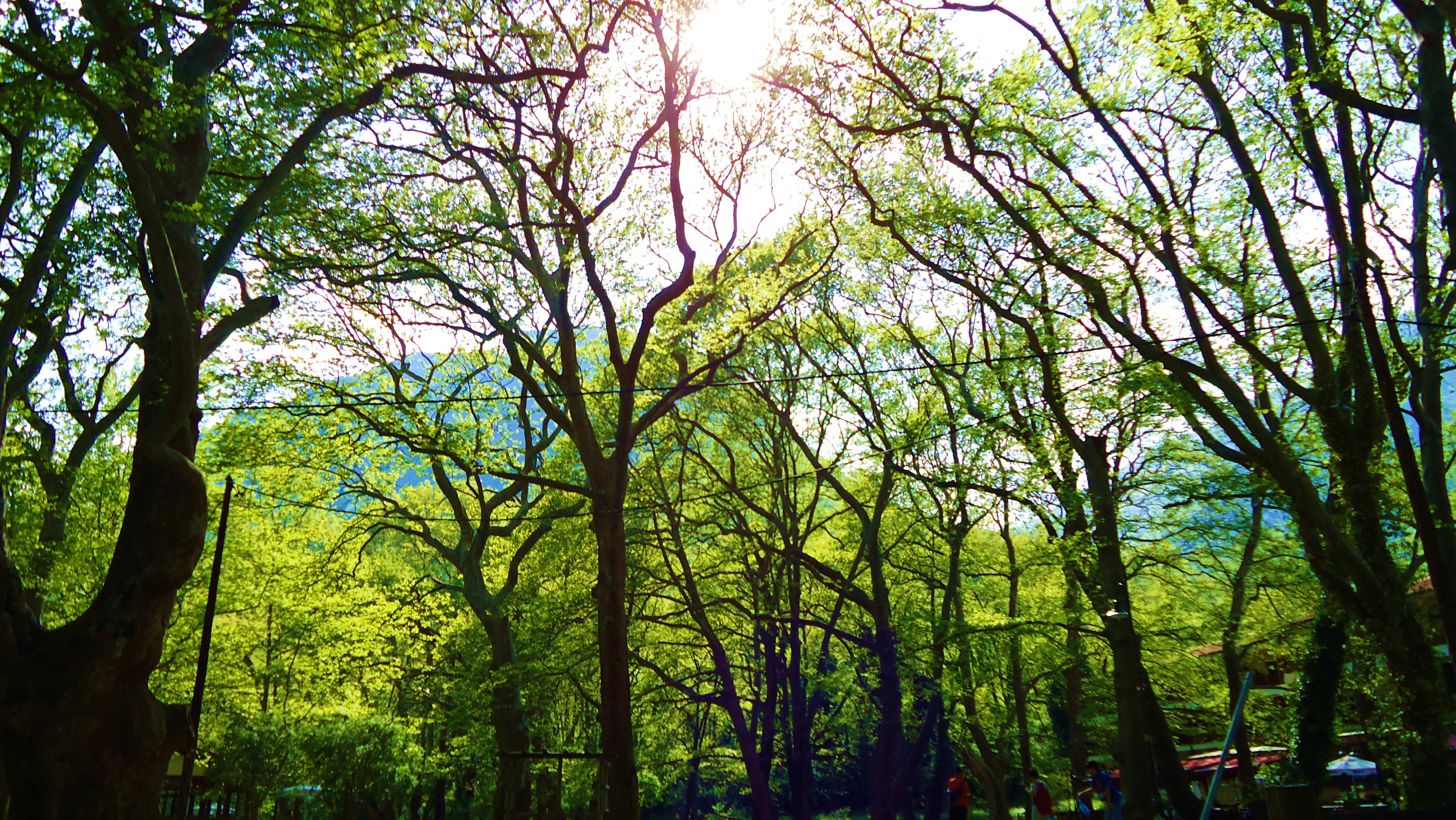
Agios Nikolaos Park

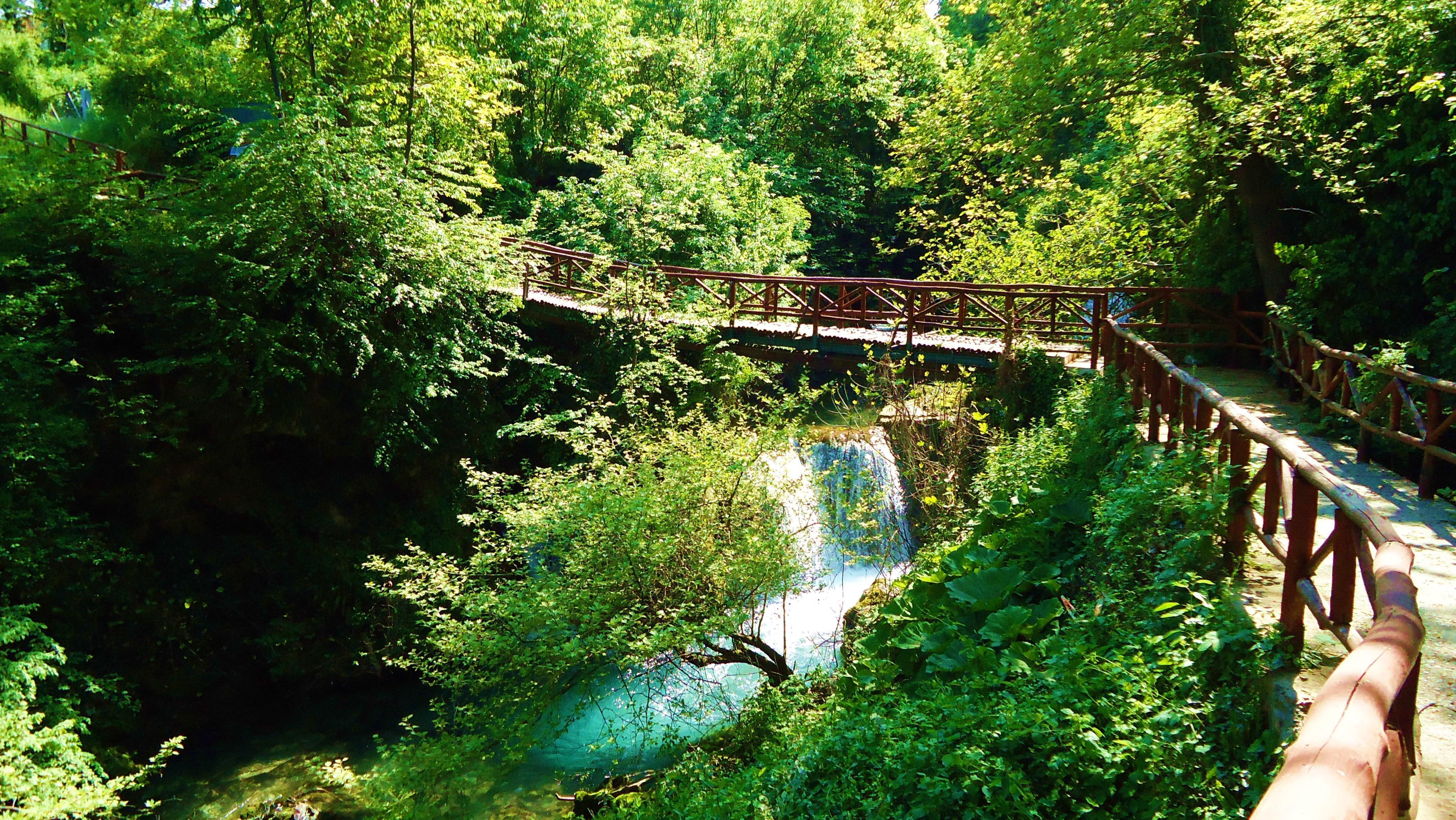
Arapitsa River crossing the city

== History ==
=== Antiquity ===
Herodotus locates at the Naousa area "the fertile Gardens of King Midas, son of Gordios". Although no ancient settlement has been identified in the current location of the city itself, numerous archaeological findings at the sites of Kopanos, Hariessa, and Lefkadia date back from the Bronze Age era to the Roman period. They indicate the presence of an important city, Mieza, where Aristotle's school, an ancient theatre, and several tombs from the Hellenistic period have been found. Mieza is also mentioned in a Delphi dedication.

=== Ottoman period ===
Information described in this section is mainly derived from books written by François Charles Hugues Laurent Pouqueville, William Martin Leake, and Basil Nicolaïdes. All three visited the Ottoman administrated Macedonia and referred to Naousa. In addition, two historical works by the Greek authors, Efstathios Stougianakis and Thomas Bliatkas are exclusively dedicated to Naousa.

The current city was established in the second half of the 14th century. During this century, Macedonia, after having been part of the Byzantine and Serbian Empires, started to be conquered by the Ottomans. The anarchy prevailed in the region and people took refuge in the place of present-day Naousa, from where they could easily see impending dangers, the entire plain lying at their feet. The officialization of the settlement in the frame of the Ottoman Empire is connected with the military commander Evrenos. Its Ottoman name was Ağustos, which evolved to the Greek Niaousta, and then Naousa.

Since its foundation, Naousa was a Christian city; the only Ottomans present were the Qadi and the Voivode (commander). Its inhabitants had been awarded important tax privileges, self-government rights, as well as the right of having their own garrison. Many of these privileges were obtained thanks to the intervention of Mara Branković, daughter of the Serbian ruler Đurađ Branković and wife of the Sultan Murad II. This resulted in a rapid increase of population and the development of handicrafts (weaponry, goldsmithing, weaving, etc.). The Ottoman traveller Evliya Çelebi mentions that, during his visit in the 17th century, Naousa was inhabited by Greeks. At that time, it was already a well-known urban center with about one thousand houses, and an economic influence in the region of central Macedonia.

An important uprising took place in 1705, when a Turkish official arrived with the order to recruit young boys for the Janissary battalions. The residents refused to hand over their children and killed the official and two of his companions. Led by the armatoles Zisis Karademos and his two sons, some 100 people raised the flag of rebellion and inflicted blows on the conquerors. However, a detachment of 800 Turks managed to surround the rebels and finally kill Karademos. His two sons were arrested and sentenced to death. The uprising of the Naousians in 1705 contributed to the end of devshirme in the Balkans.

In 1772, Naousa became one of the centers of a conspiratorial movement for a rebellion against the Ottomans, instigated by Sotirios Lefkadios, an agent of the Russian Empire. The bishops of Edessa, Veria, Servia, Kozani and other cities, decided the formation of military corps with the help of the armatoles. There is no precise information regarding the fate of this conspiracy. However, at that time, the Ottomans, fearing an attack by the Russian fleet, committed many atrocities against the Greeks. This situation ended with the Treaty of Küçük Kaynarca (1774), which forced the Ottoman Empire to grant many privileges to the Greeks.

In the meantime, Naousa continued to develop at a rapid pace. Within a century, its population almost doubled and it gained a reputation for both its wines and its educational activities. Such flourishing attracted the interest of the ambitious Ali Pasha of Ioannina. Starting from 1795, he tried several times to annex the city to his administration, using either sieges or treachery. He achieved his goal in 1804, but he was obliged, by order of the sultan, to abandon the city eight years later.

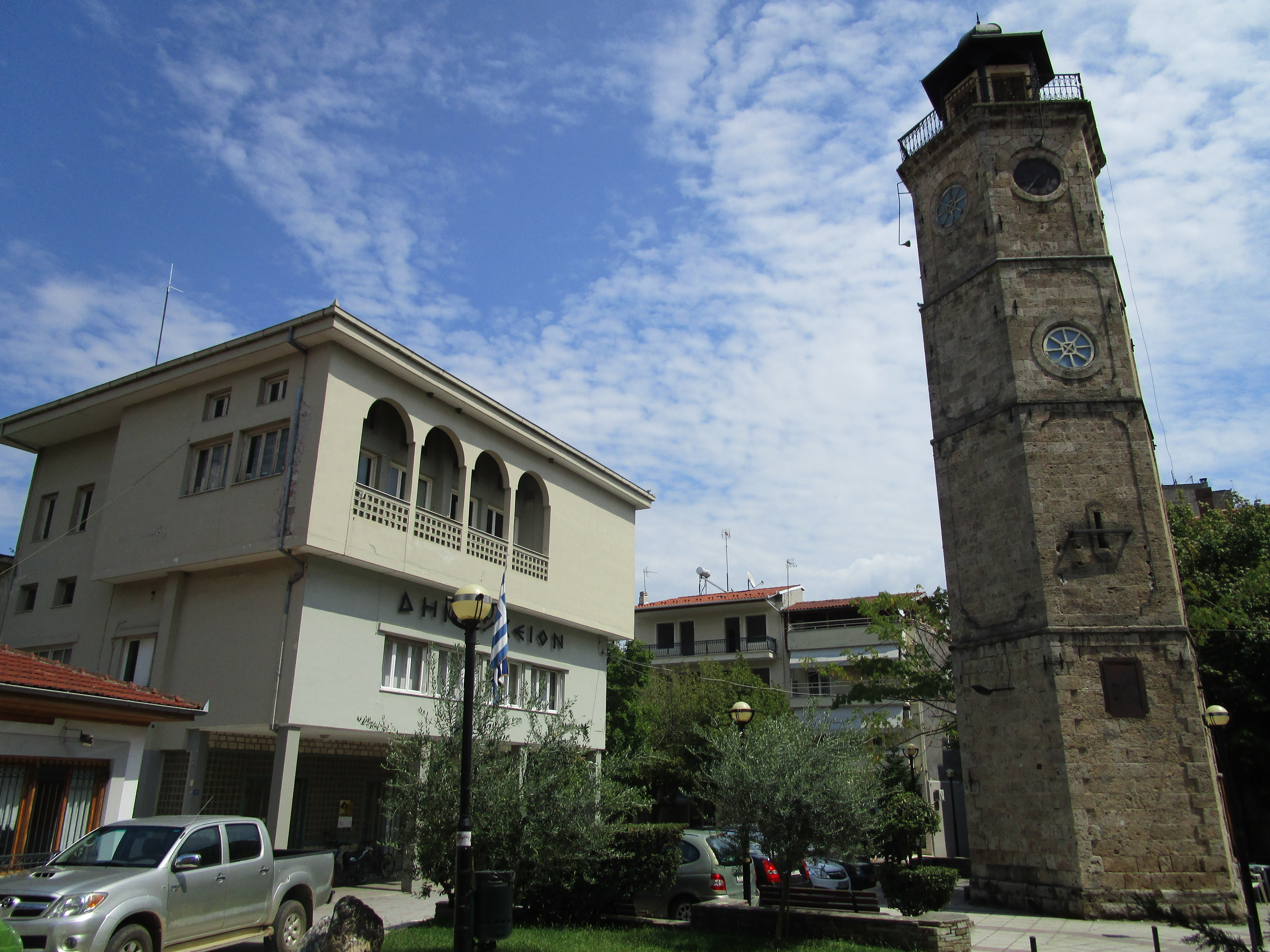
Clock Tower

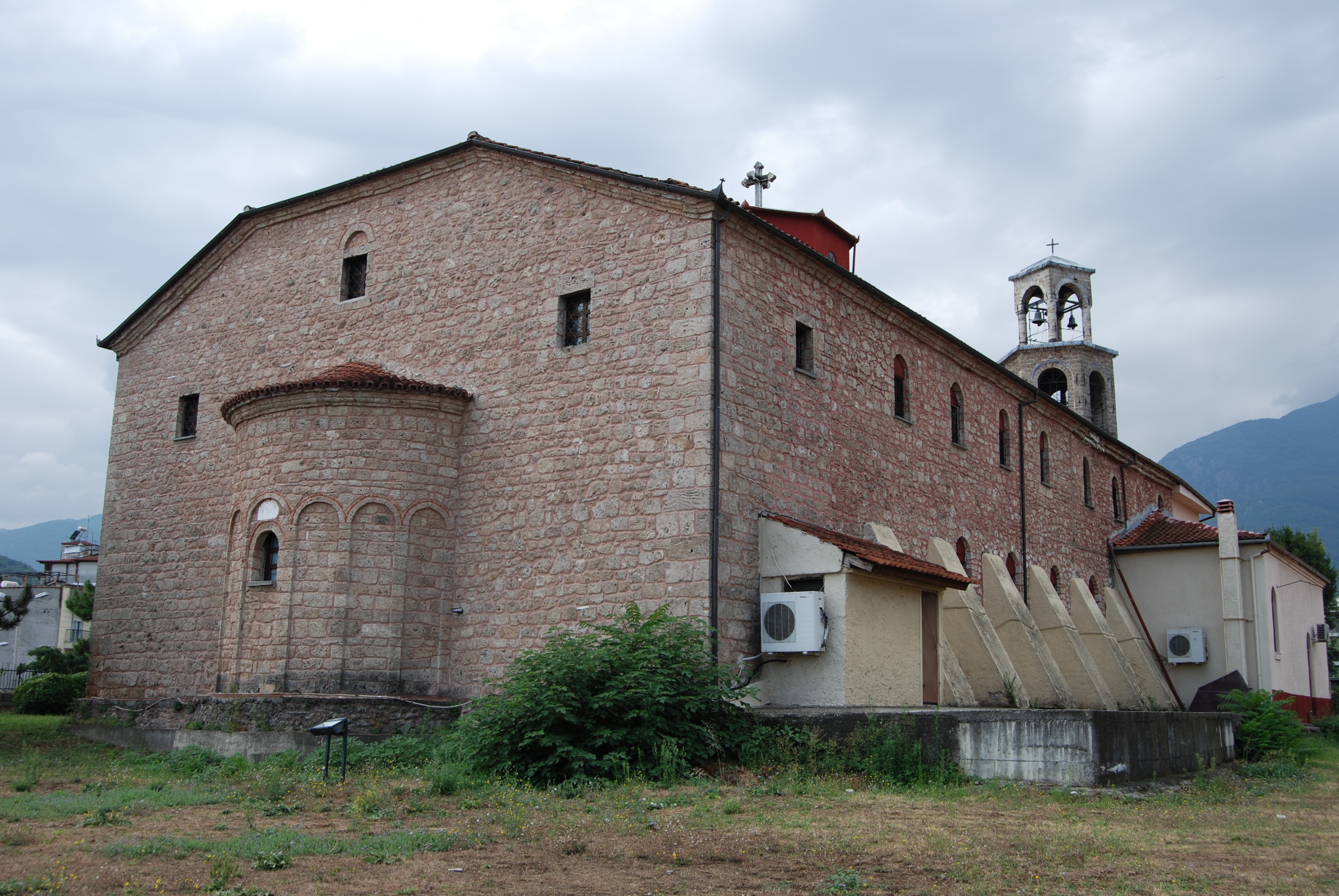
St George church

=== Greek Revolution of 1821 ===
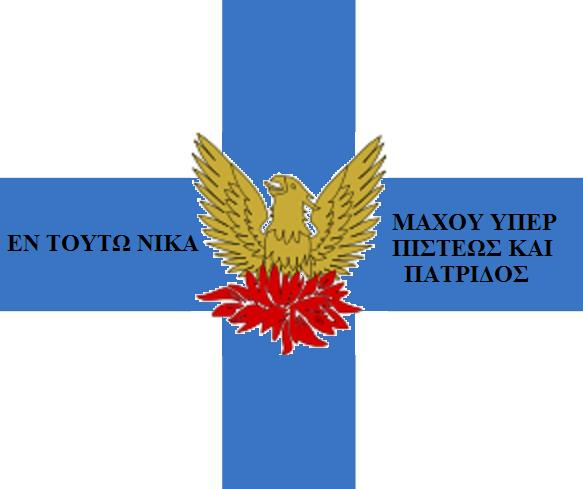
Flag of the 1822 Naousa revolution

In February 1822, Naousa, despite its prosperity, took part in the Greek War of Independence. A solemn declaration of the revolution was made in the Cathedral with praise, swearing, revolutionary chants and the raising of flags on the towers and gates of the city. Military operations led by Zafeirakis Theodosiou and Anastasios Karatasos, aiming at the creation of a free revolutionary regime in the region, led to the siege of the city. Abdul Abud, the Pasha of Thessaloniki, arrived on 14 March with 16,000 soldiers and 12 cannons. The Greeks defended Naousa with a force of 4,000 men. The Ottomans attempted to take the city on 16, 18, and 19 March, without success; on 24 March, they started a bombardment lasting for several days. Their attack failed, but on 6 April, after receiving a reinforcement of additional 3,000 men, they finally overcame the Greek resistance and entered Naousa. A complete destruction of the city, looting, massacres and persecutions of the population followed. Several women preferred to kill themselves by falling with their children into the foamy waters of the Arapitsa waterfall in the Stubanoi site in order to avoid being captured. According to official Ottoman documents, 409 Naousians were killed, 33 left the city, and 198 were pardoned. Over 400 women and children were sold as slaves. The properties of the dead and fugitives (655 houses) and the church were confiscated. The fall and the massacre of Naousa marked the end of the Greek Revolution in Central Macedonia. After this catastrophe, the city lost its privileges for the next few years. Many Naousians went to Southern Greece, where they continued the struggle in the frame of the Greek War of Independence.

=== Macedonian Struggle ===
Despite the above devastation, Naousa recovered quickly. In the last years of Ottoman rule, the city experienced commercial and industrial prosperity. The latter was favored by the Tanzimat reforms in the Ottoman Empire, which attributed to Christians equal rights with Muslims. A first cotton spinning mill was founded in 1875, and by 1910, a total of six industrial units were operative. Industrialization greatly benefited from the cheap energy provided by the waterfalls.

During the Macedonian Struggle, Naousa was an important center against the action of the Bulgarian komitadjis. In particular, the city supported Greek rebel bodies led by Epaminondas Garnetas and Ioannis Simanikas.

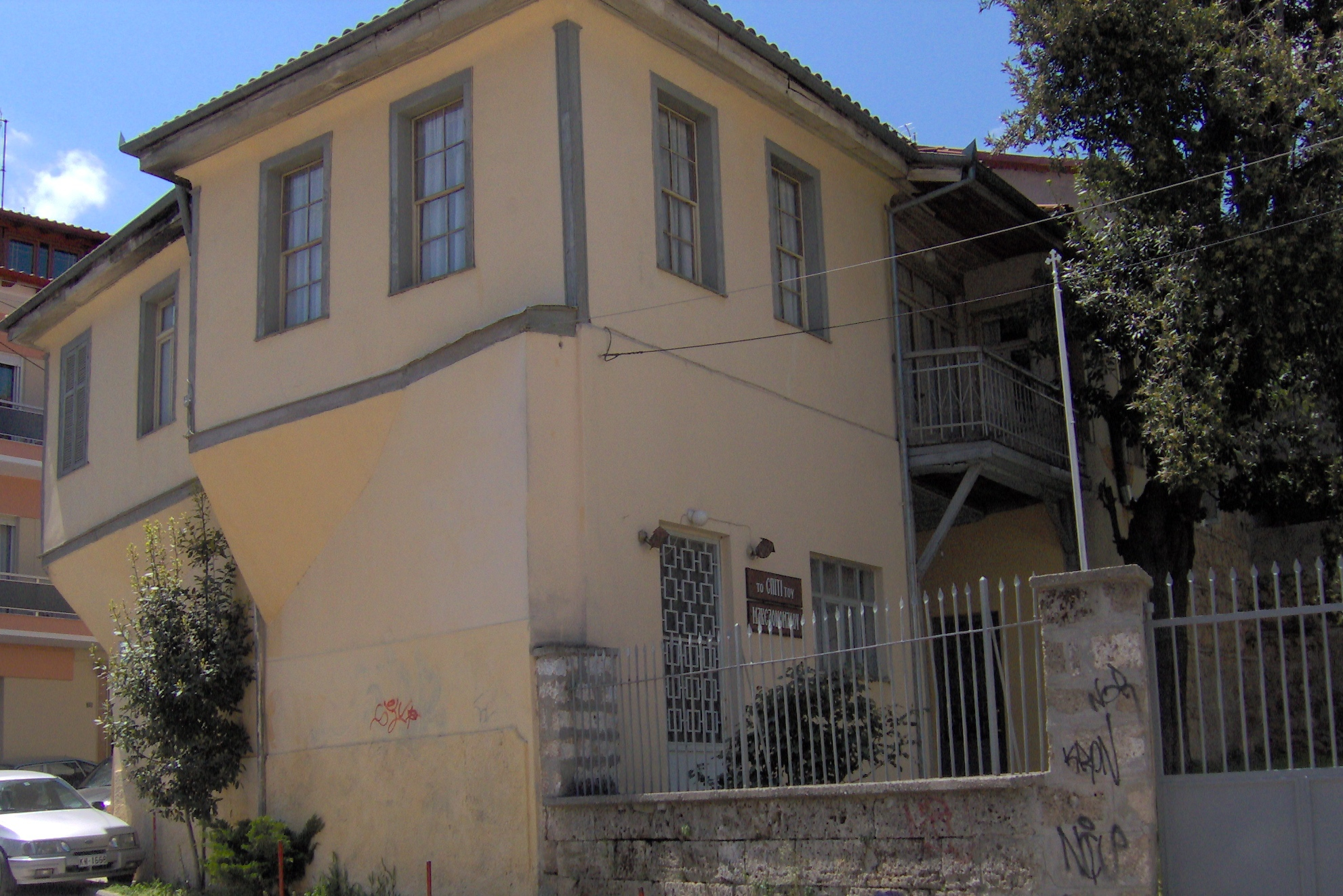
The museum of the Macedonian Struggle, housed in the old diocese of the city.

=== Modern Greek State ===
Naousa was freed from Ottoman rule on 17 October 1912. When it joined the Greek state, as established by the Treaty of Bucharest, its population was around 10,000 inhabitants, 20% of them being workers. New industrial units were founded, agriculture was modernized with systematic tree cultivation and the foreign trade was developed.

The city's population increased significantly following the Greco-Turkish War (1919–1922) and the subsequent Treaty of Lausanne, when a large number of Greek refugees, originating from Asia Minor, were settled in Naousa.

During the German Occupation, Naousians participated actively to the Greek resistance. The large number of workers living in the city constituted a fruitful recruiting ground for Greek Communist Party (KKE). Moreover, the mountainous massifs around Naousa facilitated the action of the Greek People's Liberation Army (ELAS). In September 1944, ELAS liberated Naousa.

In the course of the Greek Civil War that followed, the city suffered frequent guerrilla attacks. In 1946, a large part of Naousa was burnt and. In January 1949, the Democratic Army of Greece occupied the city for a few days, set on fire and kidnapped residents, especially young women; several prominent citizens were executed. During another assault in June 1949, 300 inhabitants were taken as hostages. From 1945 to 1949, three Mayors were executed and the municipal archives destroyed. Eventually, the National Air Force attacked the retreating rebels, who released the abductees.

== Administration and demographics ==
The province of Naousa (Greek: Επαρχία Νάουσας) was one of the provinces of Imathia. It had the same territory as the present municipality. It was abolished in 2006. The current municipality of Naousa was established by the 2011 local government reform, with the merger of the following three former municipalities that became municipal units:

- Anthemia
- Eirinoupoli
- Naousa

The municipality has an area of 425.491 km^{2}, the municipal unit 300.891 km^{2}.

Population of the municipal unit of Naousa
| Year | Pop. | ±% |
|---|---|---|
| 1920 | 8,483 | — |
| 1928 | 10,438 | +23.0% |
| 1940 | 12,815 | +22.8% |
| 1951 | 12,584 | −1.8% |
| 1961 | 15,492 | +23.1% |
| 1971 | 17,375 | +12.2% |
| 1981 | 19,430 | +11.8% |
| 1991 | 19,794 | +1.9% |
| 2001 | 22,274 | +12.5% |
| 2011 | 21,152 | −5.0% |
| 2021 | 19,706 | −6.8% |

== Geography ==
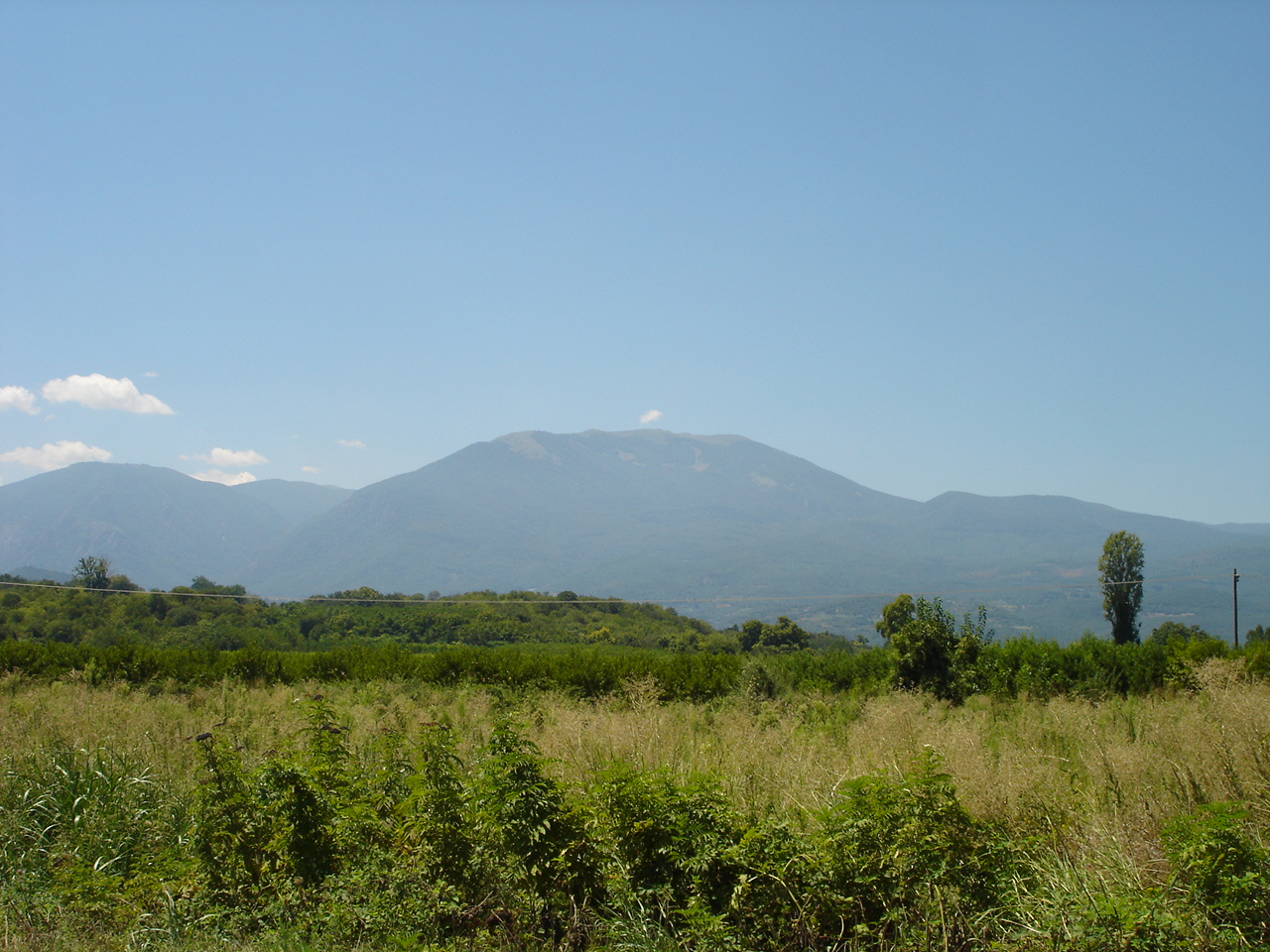
Vermio Mountains

Naousa is located in Northwestern Imathia, 22 kilometers north of Veria and 90 kilometers west of Thessaloniki. The city lies on the eastern foothills of Vermio Mountains, one of the biggest mountain ranges in Greece, and west to the plain of Giannitsa. Naousa is today the largest forest-owning municipality in the country being also surrounded by orchards, producing peaches, apples, cherries and other fruits. Due to its location, the altitude varies by as much as 150m between the lowest and highest parts of the city, and it reaches nearly 550m in the Saint Nicholas Park. Naousa is crossed by the river Arapitsa forming a waterfall within the city.

== Climate ==
Naousa has a humid subtropical climate (Cfa) in the Köppen climate classification but due to its inland location and elevation, is more continental (and less Mediterranean) than in most Greek cities. It is heavily influenced by the mountains, rising up to the west, and the plain of Giannitsa to the east. On one hand, the mountains shelter the area from cold winds blowing from the north and west down the Balkan Peninsula and also from hot southwest winds, creating a non-extreme microclimate. On the other, they create föhn winds, which draw in cool, damp air from the Aegean coast. The annual precipitation of Naousa is typically lower than in western Greece, but it is one of the highest in the Macedonia region, measuring around 710 mm per year. Winters can be cold. In the city, snowfall is not uncommon (snow falls at an average of 10–15 days per year) and measurable amounts of snow can remain on the ground for several days. Typically, downtown Naousa experiences milder winter temperatures than the suburbs where temperatures can drop many degrees below zero. Recent years have been a lot warmer and the 2007 European heat wave saw Naousa reaching 40 °C for the first time in recent memory, with an absolute maximum of 41.3 °C on 25 July. On 8 January 2017, temperature dropped to -10.5 °C, which is a 10-year low.

== Economy ==
The wider area of Naousa is famous for the production of high quality peaches, apples, cherries and, most importantly, for its wine. The "Naoussa" red wine has received many awards in Greece and abroad. A special variety called xinomavro acquired the European label PDO (protected designation of origin).

The Naousa carnaval, staging dancing of Boules and Genitsari, attracts many visitors.

== Architecture ==
The hallmark of the city is the 25 meters high Clock Tower, donation of the industrialist Georgios Anastasiou Kirtsis. It was built in 1895 with ashral stones and retains its original mechanism.

A modern trademark is the 11 meters high Obelisk, located in the central square of the city, whose construction was completed in 2002.

The totality of the old churches were burned during the 1822 holocaust. However, several of them were reconstructed. The oldest churches (Saint George and Panagia) date from the 19th century and are three-aisled basilicas.

The traditional Macedonian-style buildings in Naousa are usually large, two-storey constructions with inner courtyard. They are made of tufa, adobe and wood. Only few of them survive today. The most important mansions are located in the "Pouliana" and "Batania" districts, those in "Alonia" being smaller working class houses. The "Galakeia" and "Sefertzio" primary schools and the "Lappio" Gymnasium, named after their donors, deserve particular mention.

Industrial buildings, most of which served as textile factories during the 19th and 20th centuries, are encountered all over the city. Since the 1990s, these factories gradually ceased to operate, because of the crisis in the textile industry. Several of them are currently municipal property. Renovated, they are used for various purposes. For example, one of them one houses the Department of Technology Management of the University of Macedonia, while others are being turned into Museums and multi-cultural spaces.

== Sights and Activities ==
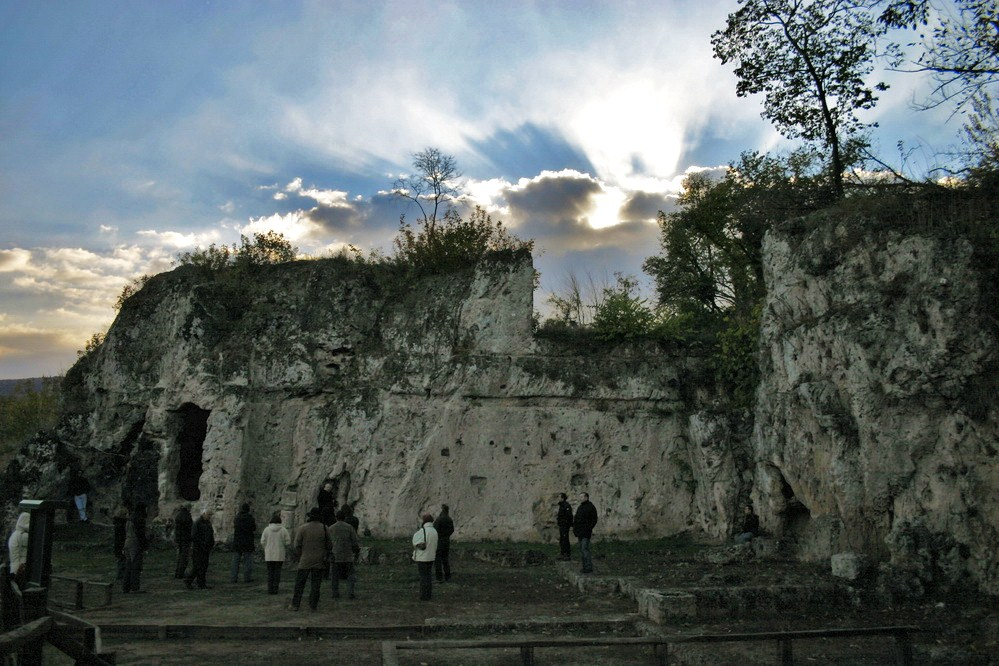
Aristotle's School

=== Museums ===
- Historical and Folklore Museum: exhibits of the cultural heritage from Naoussa area (local costumes, textiles, looms, weapons, jewelry...). It is located at 10, St. Dimitriou.
- Wine and Vine Museum: history and process of wine production, and related objects. It is located at 17, Hatzimalousi Street, in a neoclassical building from 1908, owned by the Boutari family, founder of the homonymous wine company. It also houses the BIBON oenological library,
- Vlach Folklore Museum: exhibits from the life of Naoussa΄s Vlachs (looms, flokati rugs, uniforms...). It is located at 23, Sofroniou Street.
- Euxinos Club of the Naoussa Pontians: large library containing almost 1,000 books brought by the refugees in 1923 from the Library of Argyroupolis in the Black Sea Region.
- Simanika Collection: private collection of classical music, including 4,000 records, CDs, cassettes and videotape, which has been donated to the Municipality.

=== Parks ===
Naousa is surrounded by a lot of greenery and has several parks. The municipal park, which was created in the 1950s, covering an area of approximately 30 acres, is one of the most important inner-city parks in Greece. With a landscaped flower garden and a lake of approximately 1.5 acres, hosting fish, ducks and swans, it has a commanding view of the plain of Imathia. In 2021, the municipal park became a full member the European Route of Historic Gardens of the Council of Europe.

=== Agios Nikolaos ===
The sources of the Arapitsa river are located at Agios Nikolaos, a site characterized by dense vegetation of plane trees, at a distance of only three kilometers from the city center. Arapitsa supplies water to the city and irrigates the fertile estates of the entire region. The local vegetation also includes wild native boxwood, linden and oak trees. The location provides organized sports areas such as volleyball, basketball, tennis, football courts as well as a state-of-the-art indoor swimming pool of Olympic dimensions. There are also guest services facilities with hotels and restaurants.

=== Ski resort ===
The ski resort of 3–5 Pigadia, is located in the Naousa metropolitan area, at 17 km from the city. It is a modern ski center at an altitude of 1,430–2,005 meters with ski slopes of every difficulty degree and endurance trails. It is the first ski center in Greece with an artificial snow system.

== Sports ==
Skiing club EOS Naousas is the oldest of the city's sporting clubs, having been founded in 1932. Naousa also hosts the clubs Naoussa F.C., which played at First National Division of Greece for one year (season 1993–1994) and EGS Zafeirakis Naousas (Greek: Ε.Γ.Σ.Ζαφειράκης Νάουσας) that competes at volleyball, handball and basketball. The name refers to the Greek prokritos Zafeirakis Theodosiou (Greek: Ζαφειράκης Θεοδοσίου) (1772–1822).

Sport clubs based in Naousa
| Club | Founded | Sports | Achievements |
|---|---|---|---|
| EOS Naousas | 1932 | Skiing | 185 Greek champions, 13 athletes at Winter Olympic Games |
| Naoussa F.C. | 1962 | Football | Earlier presence in A Ethniki |
| EGS Zafeirakis Naousas | 1974 | Volleyball, Handball, Basketball | Earlier presence in A1 Ethniki Volleyball and Handball |
| Gimnastiki Enosi Naousas | 2007 | Track and field | Athletes at Greek Championships and World Junior Championships |
| Naousa Swim Club | 2015 | Swimming | |

== International relations ==
=== Twin towns – sister cities ===
Naousa, Imathia is twinned with:

- Missolonghi, Greece
- Naousa, Paros, Greece
- Faches-Thumesnil, France (1992)
- Asenovgrad, Bulgaria (1994)
- Zgorzelec, Poland (1998)

== Notable people ==
- Anastasios Michail (17th century – 1722), theologian
- Zisis Karademos (17th century – 1705), armatole, led a rebellion
- Anastasios Karatasos (1764–1830), armatole
- Meletie Covaci (1707–1775), Catholic bishop
- Vassilios Romfeis (born 1773), klepht
- Gregory Anthony Perdicaris (1810–1883), first U.S. Consul to Greece, author
- Zafeirakis Theodosiou (18th century – 1822), political leader
- The Lappas brothers (19th century), merchants and benefactors of the city
- Ioannis Simanikas, (late 19th century), chieftain of the Macedonian Struggle.
- Grigorios Longos, textile industrialist
- Eleni Tsaligopoulou (born 1963), singer
- Konstantinos Prousalis (born 1980), volleyball player
- Sophia Ralli (born 1988), Alpine skier, 3-time Olympian, Greece's flag bearer at the 2018 Winter Olympic Games
- Apostolos Giannou (born 1990), Greek-Australian footballer

== Gallery ==
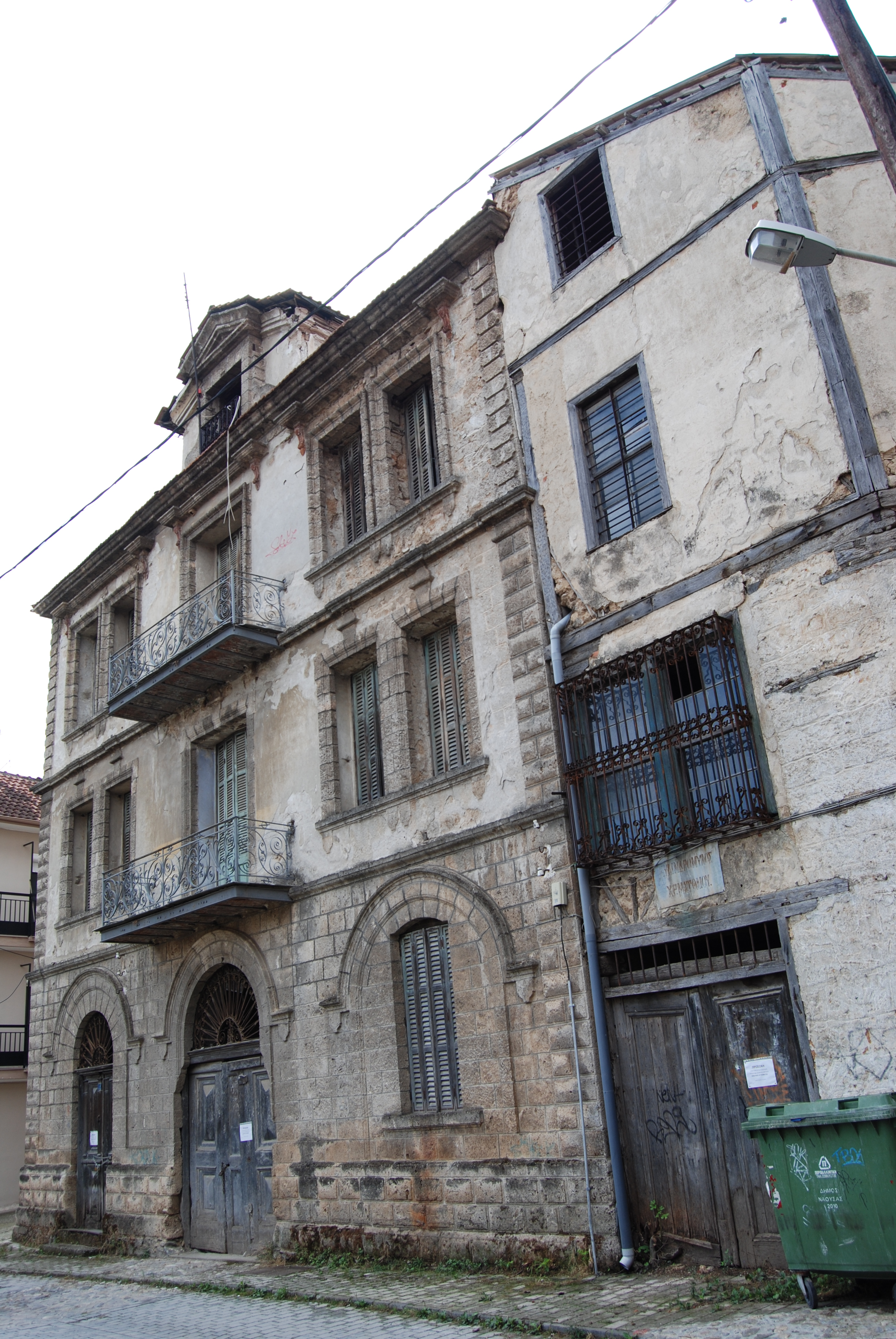
Mattheou mansion

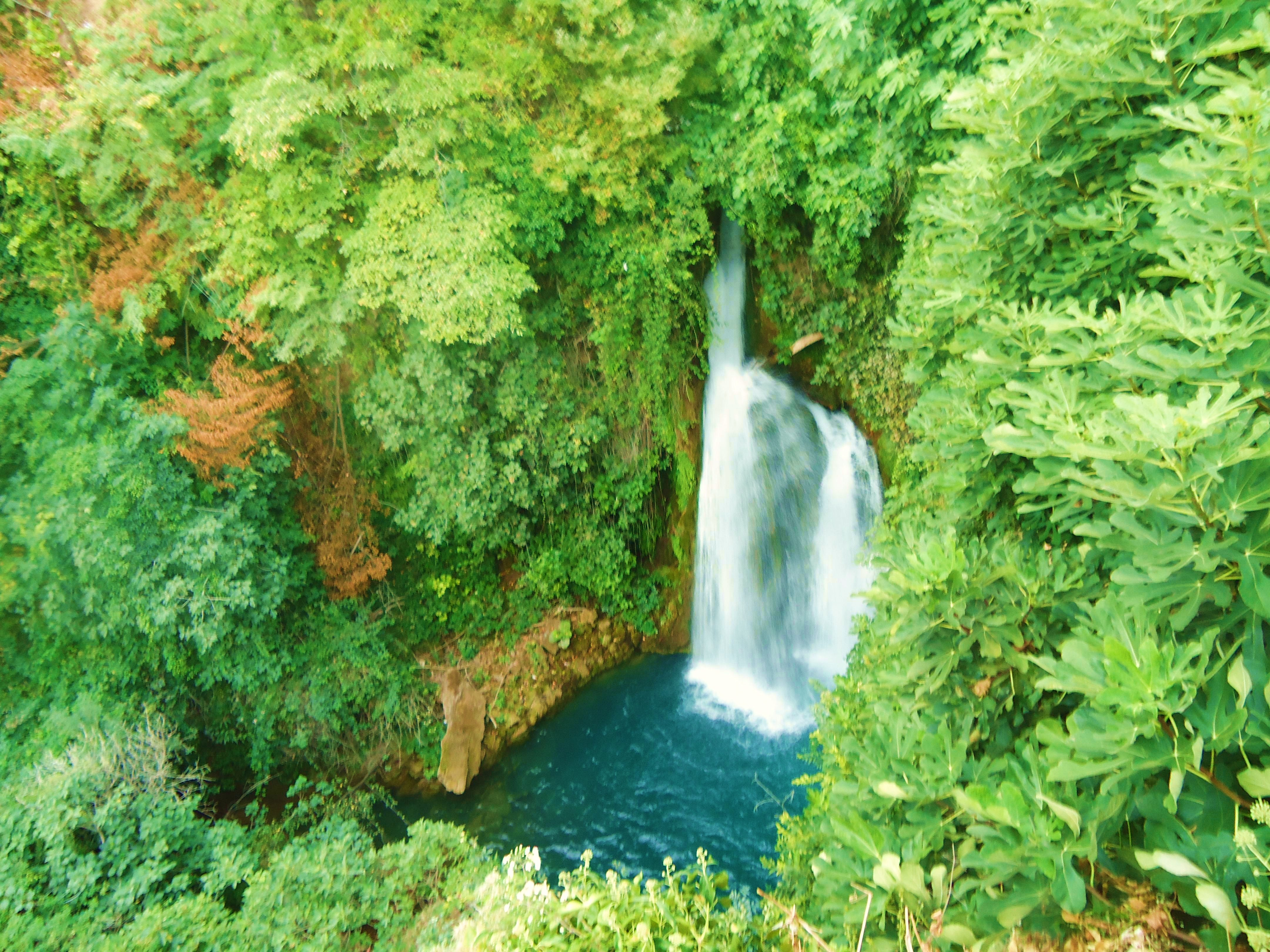
Stoumbanoi waterfalls

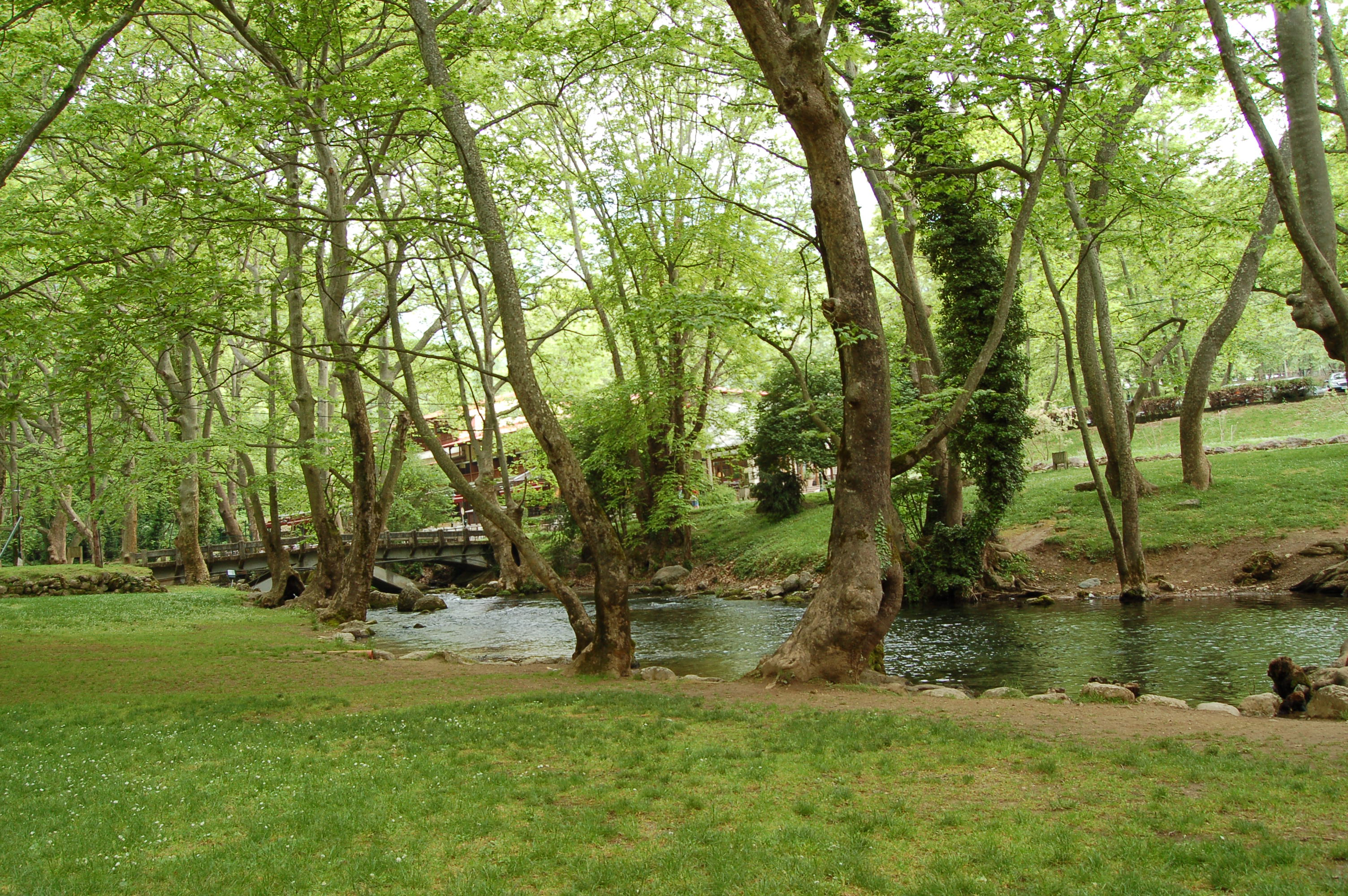
Agios Nikolaos park

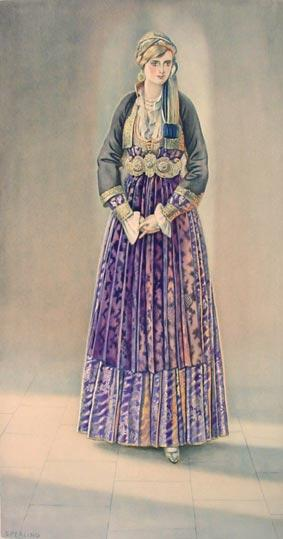
Traditional dress

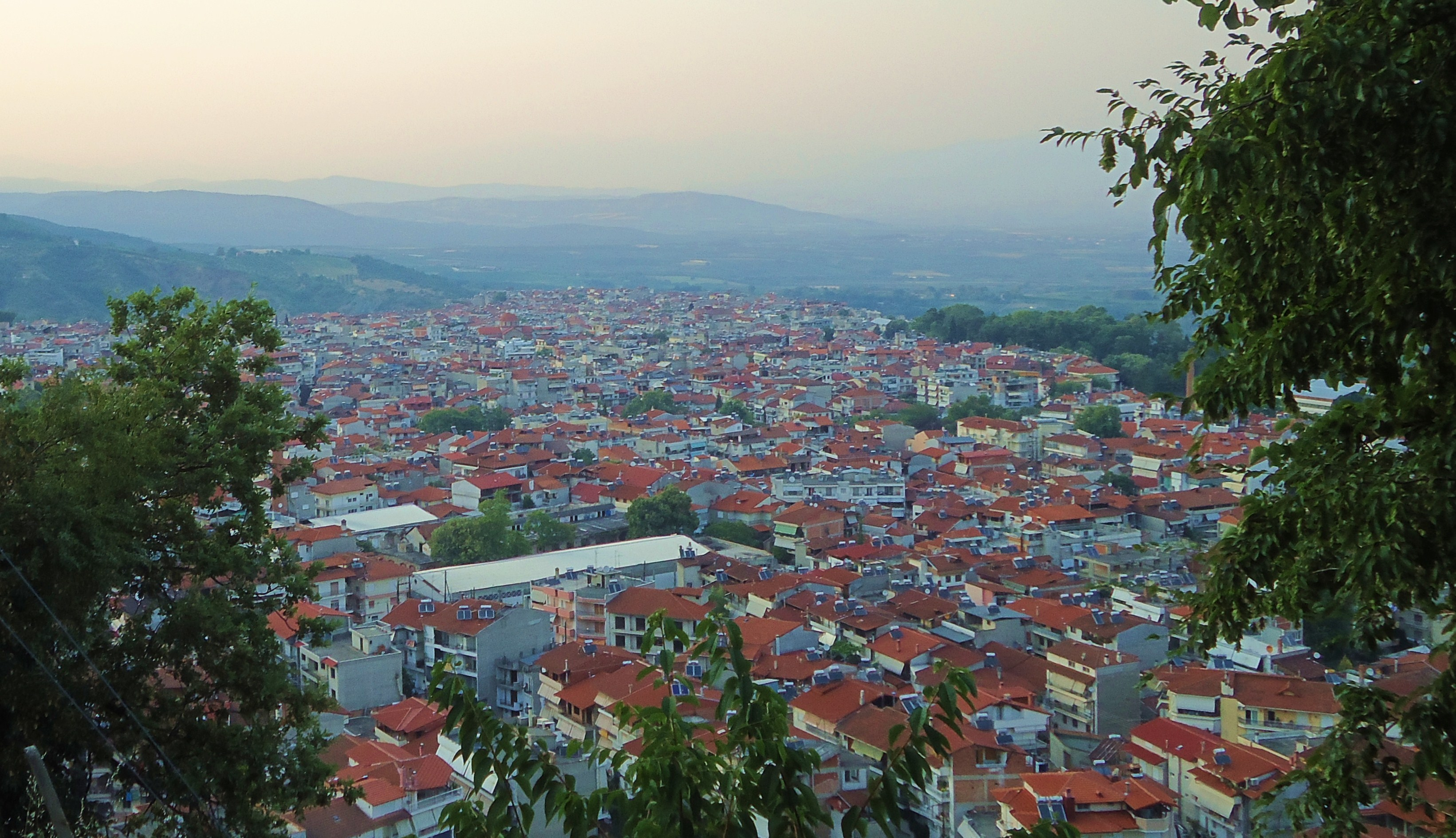
View from Theologos hill
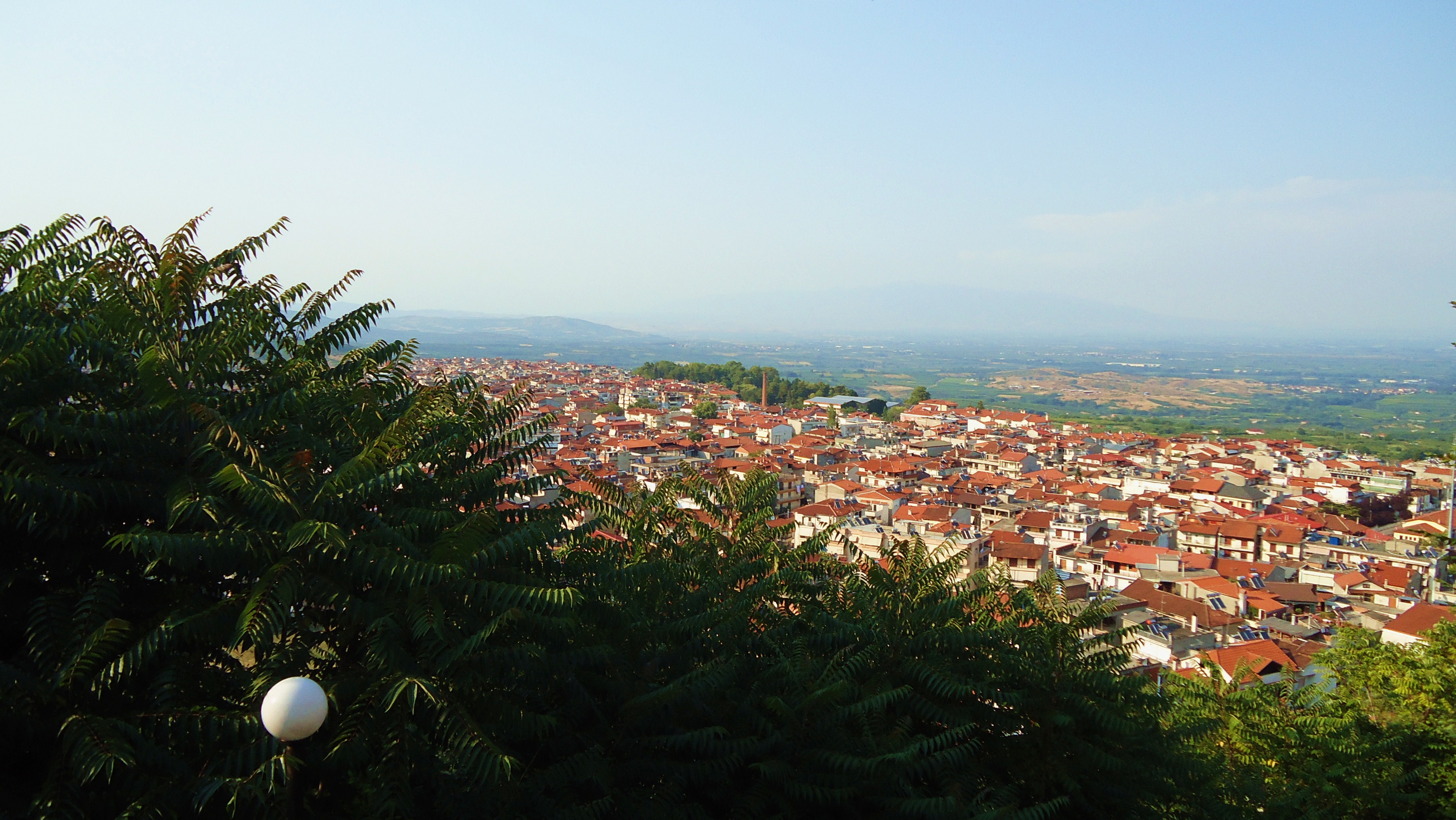
View of the eastern part of the city

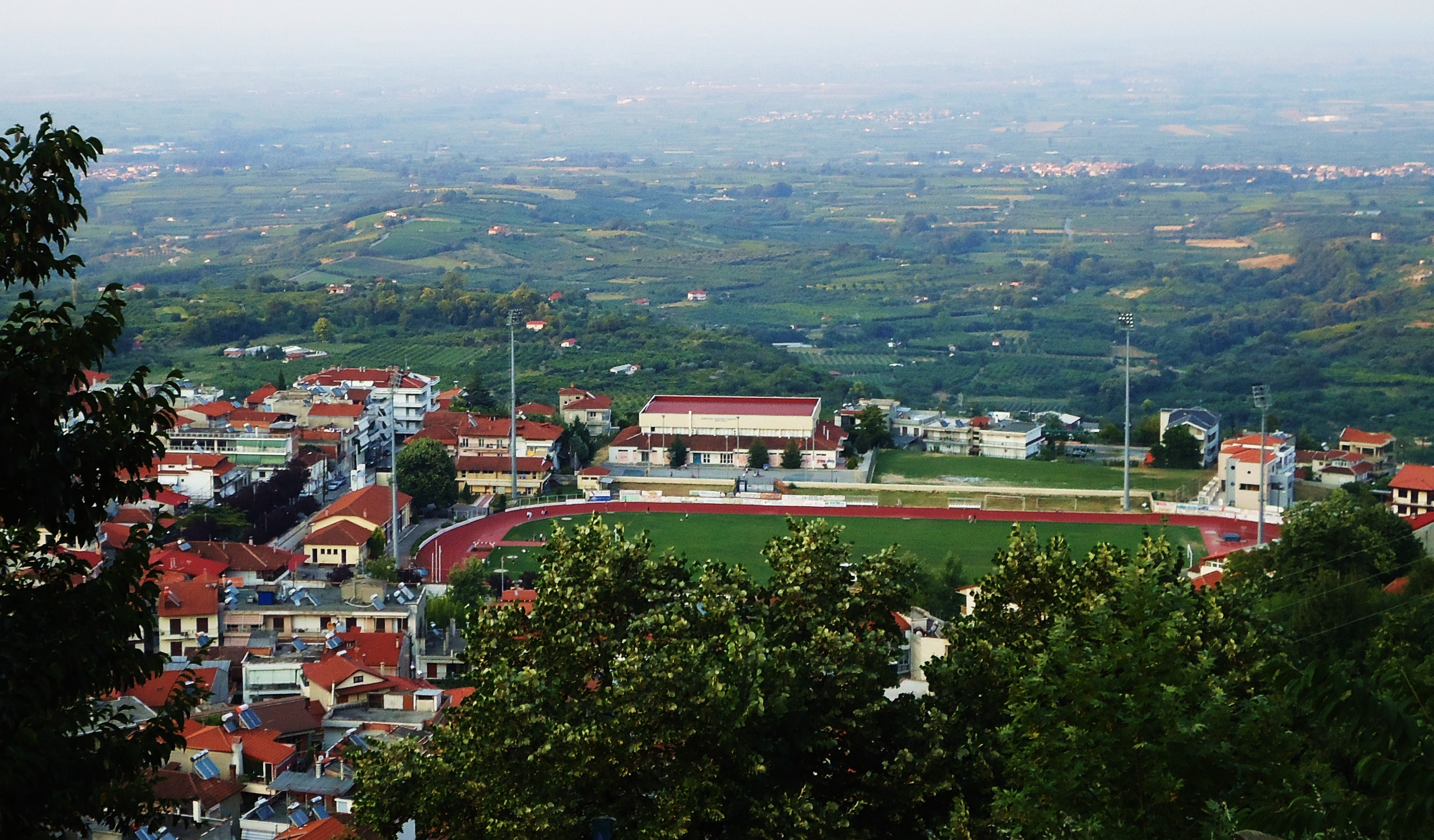
View of the Municipal Stadium Ant.Konstantinidis

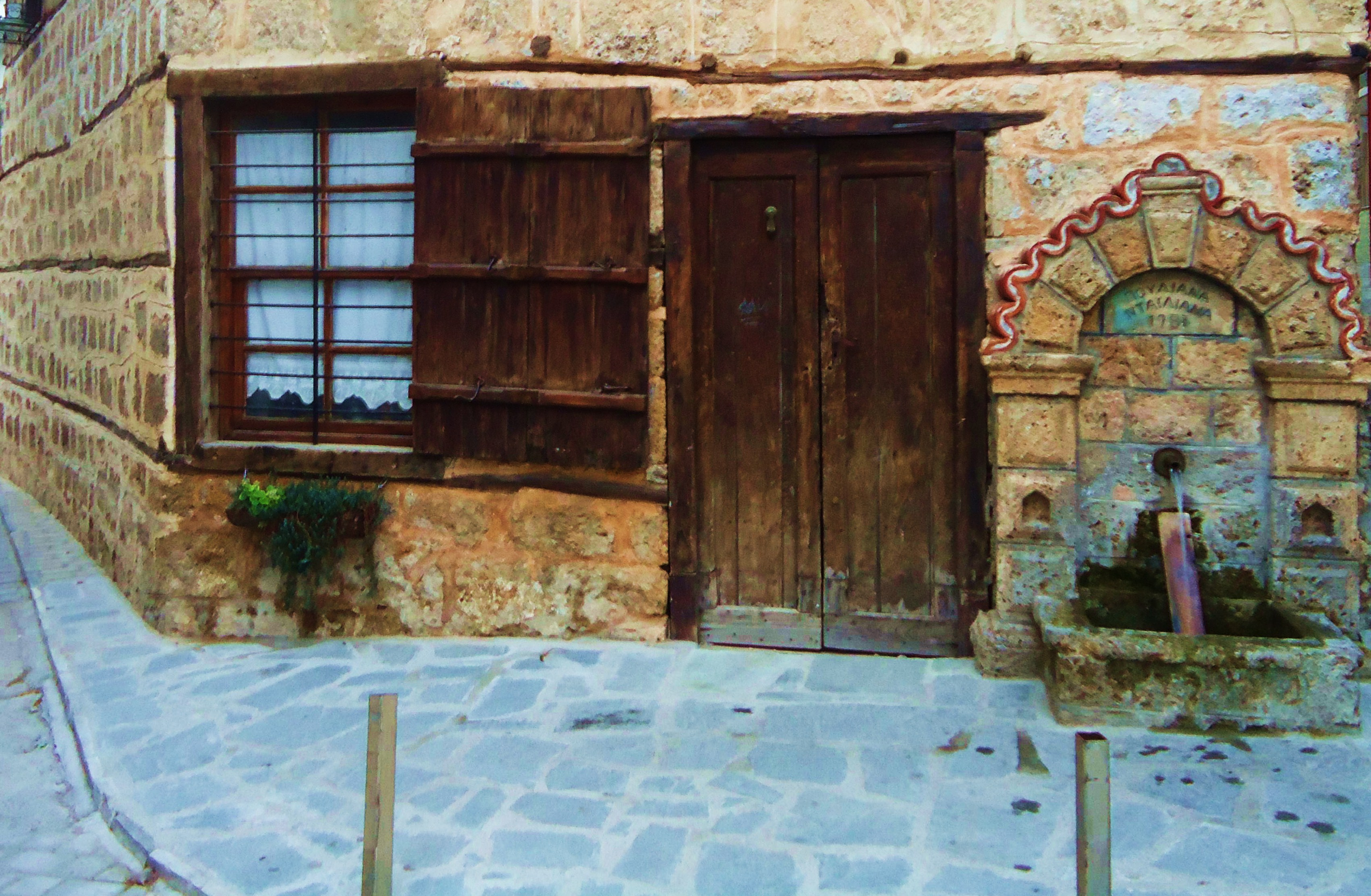
Traditional building and fountain, in the city center

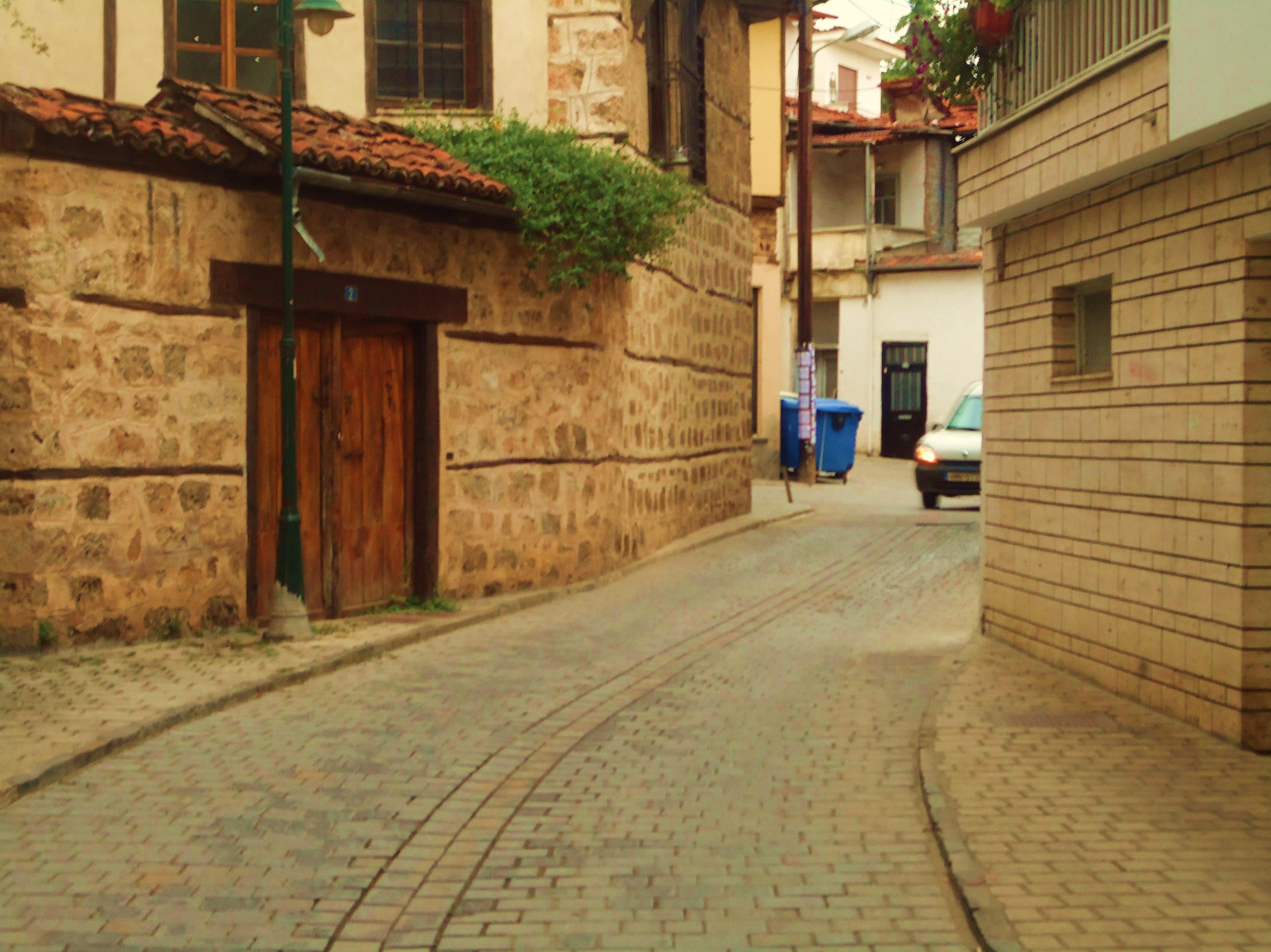
Traditional pedestrian street in an old neighborhood

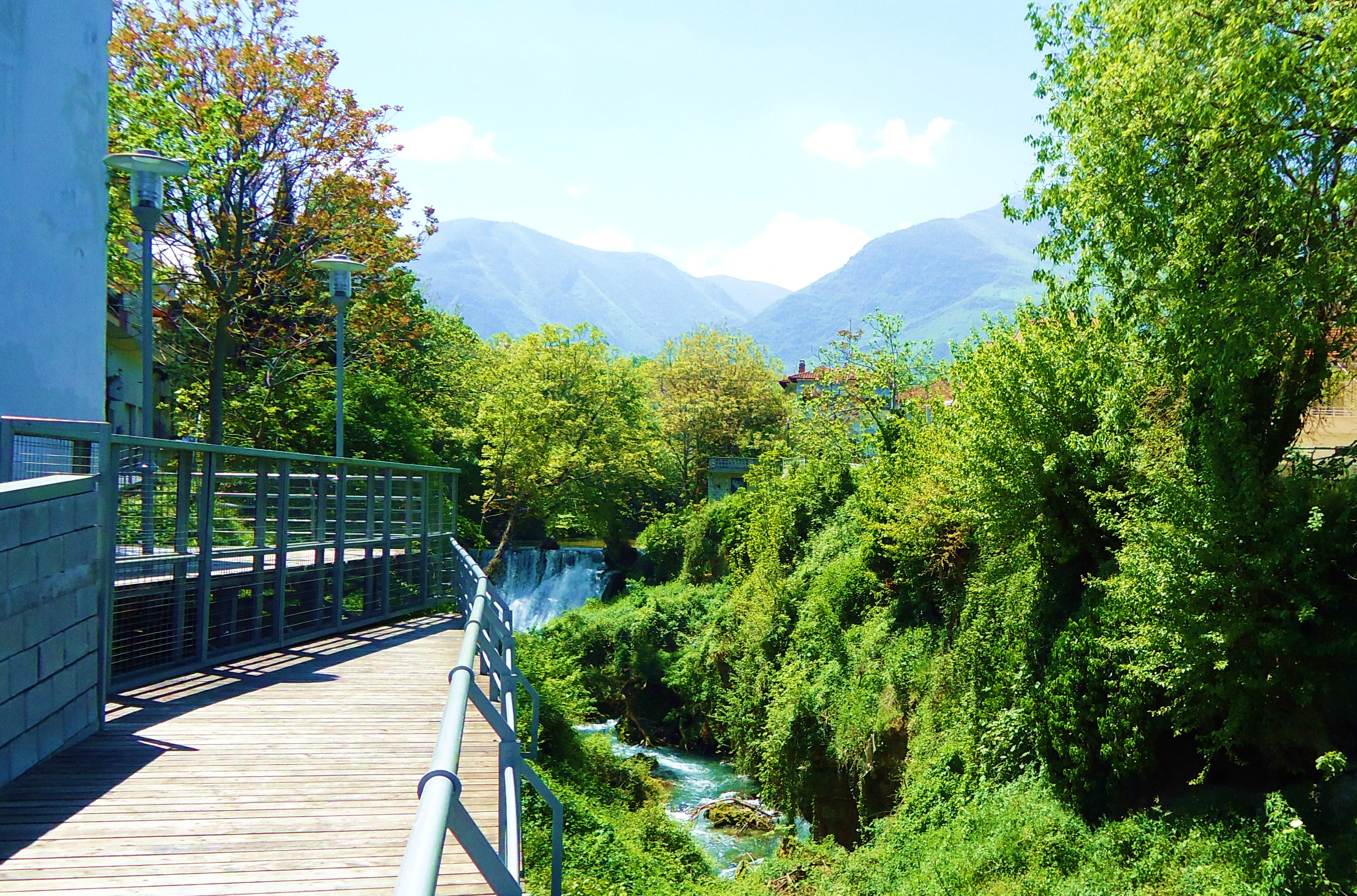
The Arapitsa River, as seen from the "Hospital Bridge"

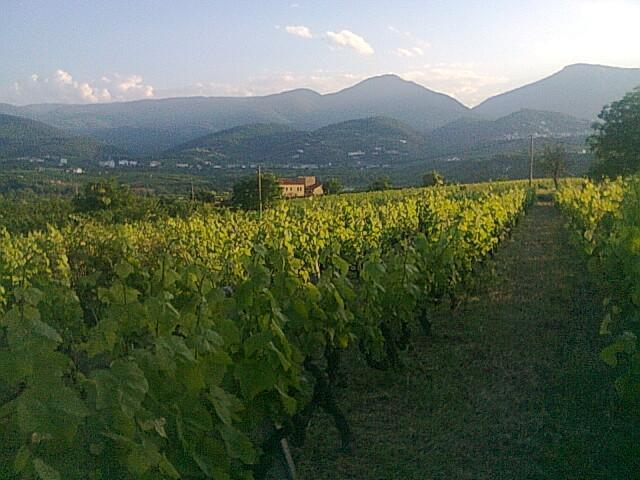
Vineyard producing Xinomavro wine

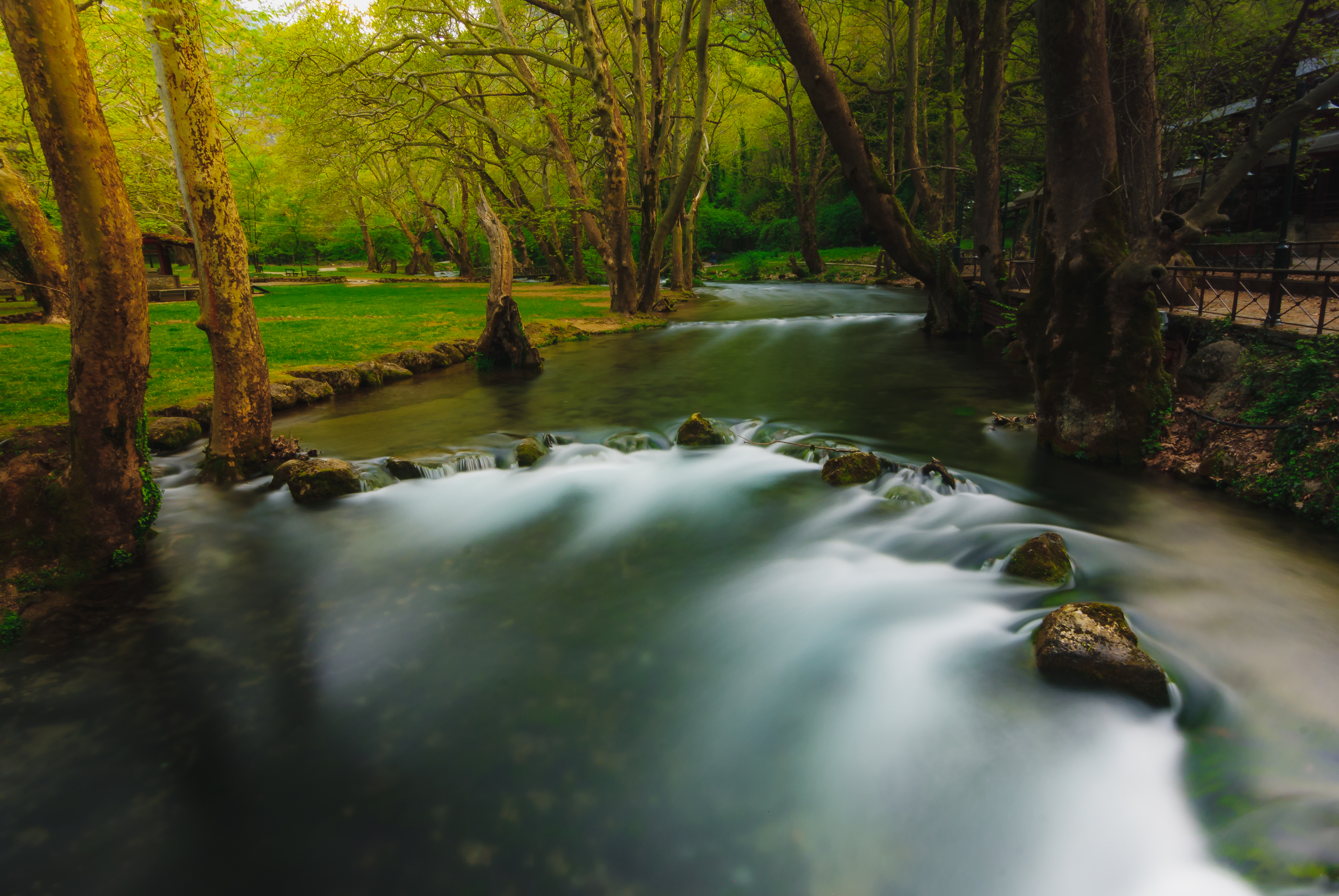
The river Arapitsa at the foot of Vermio

== See also ==
- List of settlements in Imathia
- Folklore Museum of the Lyceum of Hellenic Women
