= Lazaros Tsamis =

Aromanian merchant and Macedonian Struggle leader (1878–1933)

- Λάζαρος Τσάμης
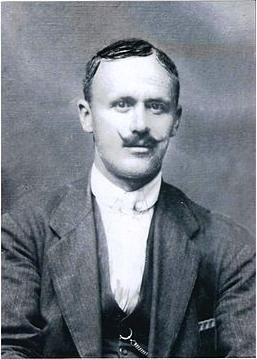
- Born: 1878; Pisoderi, Florina
- Died: November 22, 1933
- Occupation: Merchant
- Spouse: Alexandra Pertsi
- Children: 6
- Honours: National Defence Medal, Macedonian Struggle Medal, Medal of the Second Balkan War, Medal of the Northern Epirus Struggle

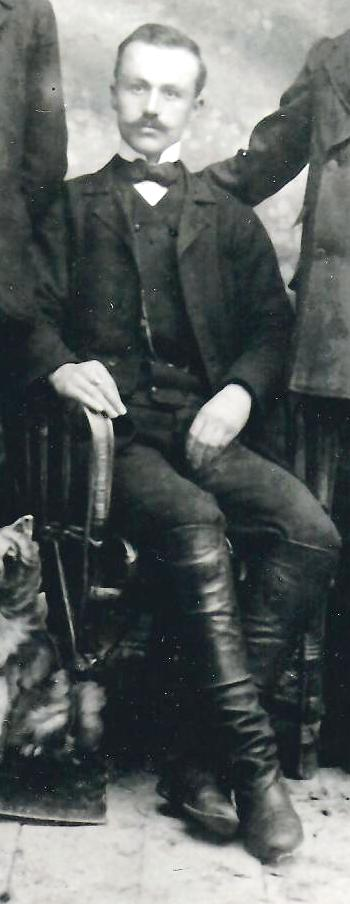
Lazaros Tsamis

Lazaros or Lazos Tsamis (Greek: Λάζαρος Τσάμης; 1878 in Pisoderi, Florina – 22 November 1933) was an Aromanian merchant who participated in the Macedonian Struggle and later volunteered to lead Greece in the struggle for Northern Epirus.

== Personal life ==
He was born in the year 1878 in Pisoderi, Florina kaza (region). His family originated from Moscopole, North Epirus. His parents were Kosmas Tsamis and Anastasia (Sia) Gkerka, the daughter of a wealthy merchant of Bitola. His family farmed large tracts of vineyards and were one of the richest in the region. His brother was Papastavros Tsamis, a clergyman who took part in the critical phase of the Macedonian Struggle in the region. In 1900, his grandfather George (Gakis) Tsamis divided a large amount of property among his children, Demetrius (Mito), Kosmas, Nahum and Stergios Tsamis. Lazarus took over the stewardship of the premises in Pisoderi, which was one of the three stores that his father Kosmas inherited. From 1900 to 1902, Lazaros Tsamis became a successful merchant and developed a network of shops in Lefkona (Popli), Bilisht, Liqenas of Great Prespa, Drenovë in Korçë, and Nakolec. He had also leased land in the Prespa Lakes by the Ottoman authorities. On September 22, 1908, Lazaros married Alexandra Pertsi in Pisoderi. He had six children with her, Basilios, Pavlos, Stergios, Olga, Antigoni and Xanthippi Tsami.

== Macedonian Struggle ==
=== The first years and his coordinated action ===
Lazaros decided to act independently, embittered by the indifference of the Greek authorities for the Greeks of Western Macedonia which was noted by the Bishop of Kastoria, Germanos Karavangelis, after an urgent petition they submitted to the Greek Government through the Greek Consul in Bitola, Stamatios Kiouze Peza. Under the pseudonym George Costas, he began secret correspondence with all prominent Greeks of the region in order to compile armed protection committees for the Greek villages of Kastoria kaza and to organize a well-coordinated information network.

=== Participation in IMRO and the first assassination attempt ===
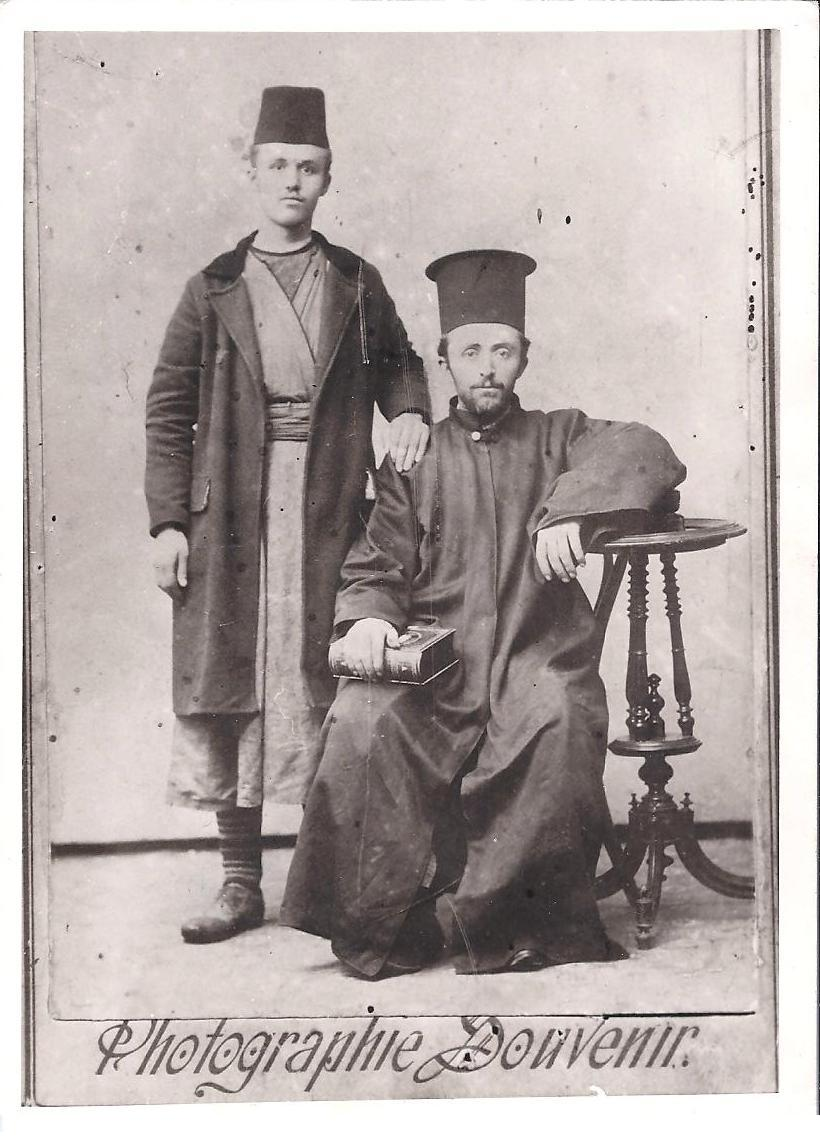
Tsamis brothers from Pisoderi, Florina

One of the first committees for the protection of villages was for Pisoderi; Lazaros Tsamis was one of the founding members. His contacts with wealthy Muslim merchants and Albanian politicians and military officials in Korestia, Prespa and Korçë quickly made him a valuable, trusted and passionate partner of Germanos Karavaggelis, Bishop of Kastoria, and the Greek Consulate of Bitola. Lazarus and his brother Papastavros organized a dense network of information in the Prespa region based on personal and business contacts. In the village of Agios Germanos, members of the network were Evangelos Dimoulis, Mountousis, Paraskevaidis, Papanaum, Traikos Vassilopoulos in the village Laimos, the Michaelides and Karidas families in the village Platy, Petridis in the village of Kallithea, the Papadopoulos family in the village Pixos, Papastefanos in the village of Psarades, the Anastasiou family in the village of Karyes and Traikos Lantzakis in the village Antartiko. At the instigation of Bishop Germanos Karavaggelis and with the consent of the Greek Consul of Monastiri Stamatios Kiouze Peza, Lazaros joined the pro-Bulgarian Internal Macedonian Revolutionary Organization (IMRO) along with his brother priest Stavros and other members of Pisoderi committee with the sole purpose of gathering information about the movements and activities of the Bulgarian revolutionary committee (pp. IMRO).

Through his participation in the IMRO and the information he gathered, he informed Bishop Karavaggelis that an envoy of the Bulgarian revolutionary committee would attempt to cross the Greek-Turkish border in Thessaly, go to Athens and procure weapons for equipping the Bulgarian rebel forces, in preparation of the impending revolutionary movement in Macedonia and Thrace. In the next update, Lazaros informed the Bishop of Kastoria that the envoy of IMRO would be the capable and passionate voivod Vasil Tsakalarof, who has excellent knowledge of the Greek language from the village Krystallopigi (Smardesi) of Florina.

Tsakalarof, despite the information the Greek authorities had at their disposal, managed to cross the Greek-Turkish border and arrived in Athens, where he visited the arms factory "Bros Maltsinioti" pretending to be an Arvanite from Ioannina and falsely stated that he wanted to buy weapons to equip Albanian rebels against Ottoman domination. He agreed to a price of 17 drachmas per rifle, he paid 220 golden coins [of 20 francs each] and shipments of arms soon began through the Greek customs office of Tirnavos, whose Greek Customs Officer was tricked (he thought that the rifles were destined for Albanian rebels) and bribed to keep quiet about the clandestine export of thousands of rifles to Macedonia.

Lazaros learned about the success of the Bulgarian operation for the equipment of Bulgarian guerrilla groups and immediately informed Bishop Germanos Karavaggelis of the smuggling of weapons and the inaction of the Greek Authorities. Then, Bishop Karavaggelis sent two members of his organization to Athens, George Gkiamos and priest Elias Papadimitriou from Chalara (Podovista), Kastoria, with a mission to identify Vasil Tsakalarof and to report him to the Greek police. During the unsuccessful police operation, Tsakalarof managed to escape after recognizing the two people who had reported him to the Greek Gendarmerie.

In May 1902, Tsakalarof entered the village of Chalara (Podovista), arrested them, and got the names of Karavaggeli's associates after torturing them. After these revelations, killings of disclosed partners from a list compiled by Tsakalarof began. After the murder of the first five people on the list, the first assassination attempt against Lazaros Tsamis took place, but he escaped because he was informed about the murders and was prepared. On August 19, 1902, near the village of Trigono (Ostima), a decisive battle occurred between the groups of Captain Kottas and Tsakalarof lasting eight hours. Lazaros took part in the battle with his brother and others from Pisoderi and forced Tsakalarof to withdraw from the region. Lazaros after the battle, went to Monastiri (Bitola) and asked for instructions from the Greek Consulate. There, he met Vice-Consul Ion Dragoumis, who urged him to go to Athens.

Indeed, in November 1902, Lazaros went to Athens with his brother Papastavros, where, at the home of the Dragoumis family, he met later Prime Minister Stephanos Dragoumis, lieutenant Pavlos Melas, scholars John Dellios and Anastasios Picheon and publisher of the newspaper Empros Demetrios Kalapothakis.

There, the Greek Vice Consul of Monastiri Dragoumis informed the Tsamis brothers about the establishing of the Association for the National Defence which had, according to its statutes, the purpose of "defending the Greek communities against any enemy" and they became members of the organization. Lazaros during the meeting informed attendees that in August 1902, Colonel of the Bulgarian Army, Athanas Giankof who had the task of preparing the uprising of the IMRO organization had reached the region of Korestia, where the villages at the foot of Mount Vitsi where located.

=== Ilinden Uprising and the first groups of Greek/Macedonian fighters ===
In the spring of 1903, Lazaros, after command from Bishop Germanos Karavaggelis, successfully ensured the smooth entry of the first fighters from Crete into the Ottoman Empire. In July 1903, the Ilinden Uprising broke out, about which Lazaros Tsamis had already informed the Greek Consular authorities in Bitola. Along with his brother Papastavros and other members of the defense committee of the village of Pisoderi, he prevented the participation of the village residents and thus protecting the settlement from retaliation from the Ottoman Army after the suppression of the revolution. The same did not happen in other villages and towns, such as Kruševo of Pelagonia. The non-participation of the locals in the revolution caused the wrath of the leader of the Bulgarian revolutionary committee Boris Sarafov, who ordered the execution of five men from Pisoderi and the arson of premises at Lefkonas village of Prespa, belonging to Lazaros Tsamis.

In March 1904, the Greek Consul in Bitola Dimitris Kallergis asked Lazaros to make a reconnaissance of the area around the monastery of St. Nicholas Tsirilovo and make sure that it safe to cross for Pavlos Melas' group. Lazos completed his mission and assured the Consulate of Bitola that the area was safe and there was no intelligence leaks, nor were there any units of the Turkish army that could jeopardize the mission.

A few days later, the Greek officers Alexander Kontoulis, Anastasios Papoulas, George Kolokotronis, Pavlos Melas, accompanied by Efthimios Kaoudis, Apostolos Tragas, George Dikonymos-Makris, George Perrakis, Lakis Pyrzas, Captain Kottas, Pavlos Kiru, Simos Ioannidis, Elias Gkadoutsi and two from Siatista, crossed the Turkish border in the area of Kritsotades in what is now Trikala Prefecture safely.

=== Smuggling of the Greek Mission and his imprisonment ===
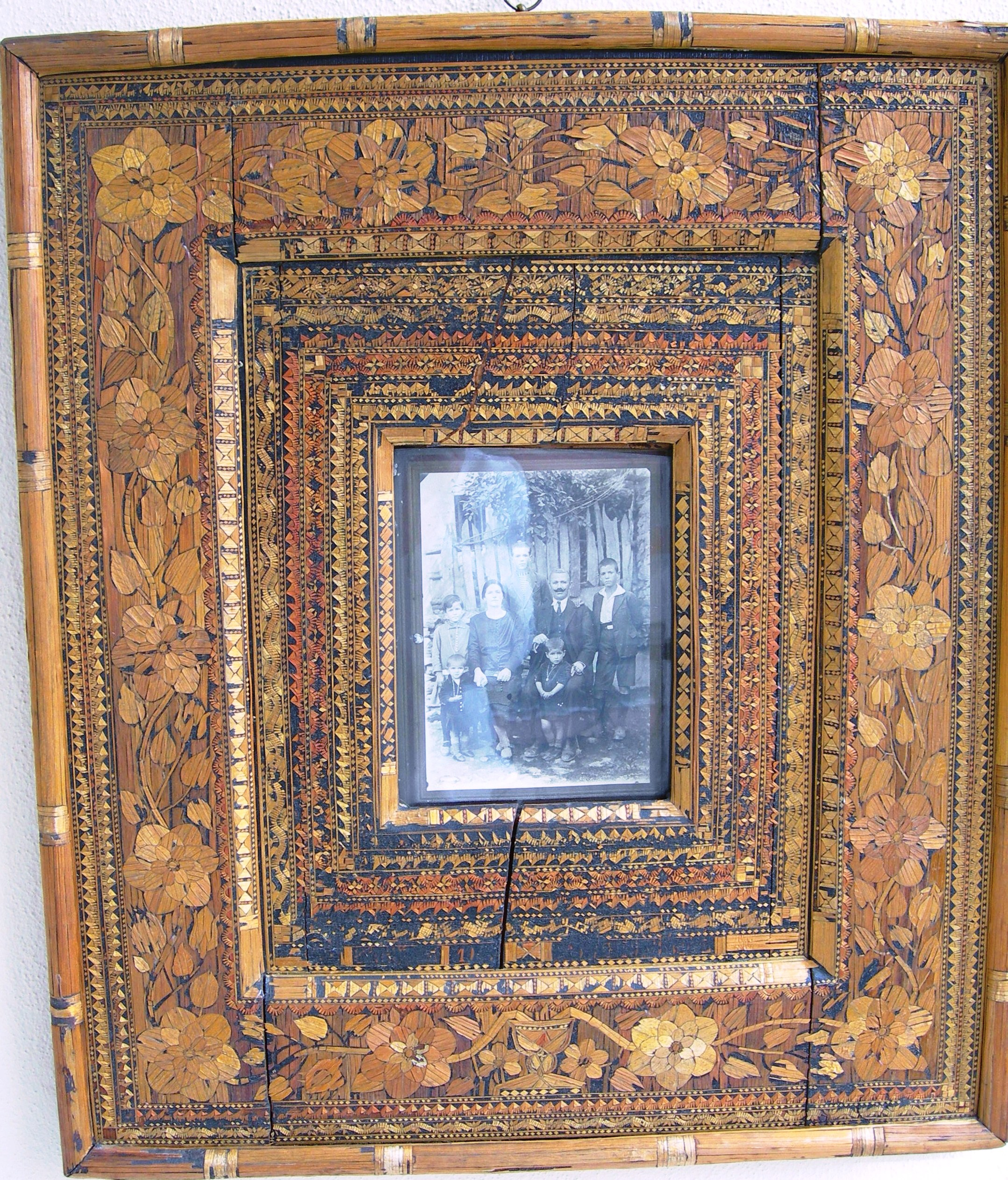
Frame donated by Captain Kottas to Lazaros Tsamis.

On 16 March 1904 Lazaros, after the advent of Greek officers in the area of Korestia, accompanied Alexandros Kontoulis and Pavlos Melas on their tour to the villages of the region. When the Ottoman Government was informed that the Greek officer Pavlos Melas was within the Ottoman territories illegally, it strongly protested to the Greek Government. The Greek side of course denied the fact. The Ottoman authorities searched the area for the Greek officer, forcing Athens to recall him to Greece. Lazaros Tsamis took command, after order from the Greek Consulate of Bitola, for the safe exit of Pavlos Melas from the area of Korestia. On Holy Wednesday of 1904, a group of 3 people, Lazaros Tsamis, Andreas Gkogko or Gogos and Nahum Papastergiou smuggled Pavlos Melas as a supposedly sick animal trader through the Turkish checkpoints, and handed him over to Vasilis Agorastos an official of the Greek Consulate of Bitola. Agorastos helped him to disguise himself and go by train to Thessaloniki and from there by ship to Piraeus. In April 1904, the Greek Consulate asked Lazaros Tsamis to organize and execute the safe return to Greece of the other members of the Greek mission, taking care of their transport from the village Antartiko to Lechovo.

Lazaros Tsamis got the information that the Ottoman authorities suspected him for involvement in the business of smuggling the Greek Delegation from the region of Korestia, and in order to mislead and distract the Ottoman authorities, he offered to lead Turkish military section of fifty men in the village of Trigono Florina (Ostima), where the gang of Bulgarian Aromanian guerilla Mitre the Vlach. In the ensuing gunfight with the Turkish army, Mitre the Vlach managed to escape but was informed who led the Turkish detachment and swore revenge. The mission of smuggled Greek Delegation, in the aftermath of military conflict in the village Trigono (Ostima) was successful but angered the Ottoman authorities when they realized that the Greek officers succeeded in escaping. Conducted extensive surveys and interviews that based on information leaked to the cared Mitre the Vlach, led to the arrest of Lazaros Tsamis and sentenced him to six months in prison in Bitola. In Bitola prison, Lazaros met Captain Kottas, who was arrested by Turkish authorities, with whom he shared the same cell. Captain Kottas, donated to Lazaros a wooden frame that chieftain himself was carved in prison, before his execution by hang. His friendship with Albanian agas from the region of Korçë and especially deep and sincere friendship with Izzet Pasha of Florina, resulted in his early release.

=== British Relief Fund and his bounty from the Bulgarian Committee ===
Immediately after his release from Bitola’ s prison was informed about the founding of the Macedonian Revolutionary Committee from the Consul General of Greece in Thessaloniki Lambros Koromilas and he joined it immediately and was given various intelligence missions in the Prespa region and Korestia. At the same time Lazaros Tsamis and his brother priest Stavros Tsamis, accepted the request of the Bishop of Kastoria Germanos Karavangelis to assist him to reveal the action of pro-Bulgarian members of the British Relief Fund towards the Macedonian People, led by journalist H. N. Breilsford, his wife, Lady Thompson, Mrs Edith Durham and others, mission that was supported by the British Consul General in Thessaloniki.

The British Relief Fund had asked the deputy kaymakam of Kastoria for permission to install and run field hospital, according to the Fund, to deal with an infectious disease, which in its symptoms, seemed to be typhoid. The kaymakam asked for permission from Hussein Hilmi Pasha (Hüseyin Hilmi Pasha) Inspector General of vilayet of Bitola, which was given when the leader of the British Relief Fund, journalist H.N. Brailsford warned the Ottoman authorities of an inevitable epidemic that swept across the province and requested by telegraph Hilmi Pasha, the creation of a military exclusion zone around the infected villages and the operation of a hospital of the British Relief Fund, which had already begun to work.

The initiative of the Bishop of Kastoria to send brothers Tsami came after information that the hospital wanted the British Relief Fund hospitalized wounded rebels of Bulgarian armed groups of civilians instead of patients, taking advantage of the existence of the military zone, within which was forbidden Turkish civilian and military personnel. Lazaros Tsamis asked the help of his personal friend and commander of the Turkish Gendarmerie detachment (French: gendarmerie) Ibrahim Hussein, who a few days later, removed from the stagecoach, Lady Thomson's letter to the British Consul of Bitola, which revealed the truth. The Bishop of Kastoria Germanos Karavangelis, took advantage of this information, warned the Ottoman authorities on the project and the Ottoman Governor appointed the colonel and physician Fuad Bey, as the only competent and responsible for overseeing the spread of disease and with the help from a Greek physician, settled an Ottoman hospital in the area.

From that moment, the supervision and control from the Ottoman authorities, reduced the activities of the British Relief Fund for the care of IMRO guerrillas, a situation mentioned in his memoirs the mission chief and journalist Henry Noel Breilfornt. The opened letter of Lady Thompson was perceived by someone in the office of Bishop of Kastoria Karavaggelis and informed about the members of the British Relief Fund, This was followed by the bounty of Lazaros Tsamis from the Bulgarian Revolutionary Committee for the sum of one thousand Ottoman pounds, demonstrating the severity of shock on the disclosure of the purpose of the operation of field hospital for hospitalization Bulgarian rebels under the banner of the Commonwealth.

=== Participation in the Macedonian Struggle ===
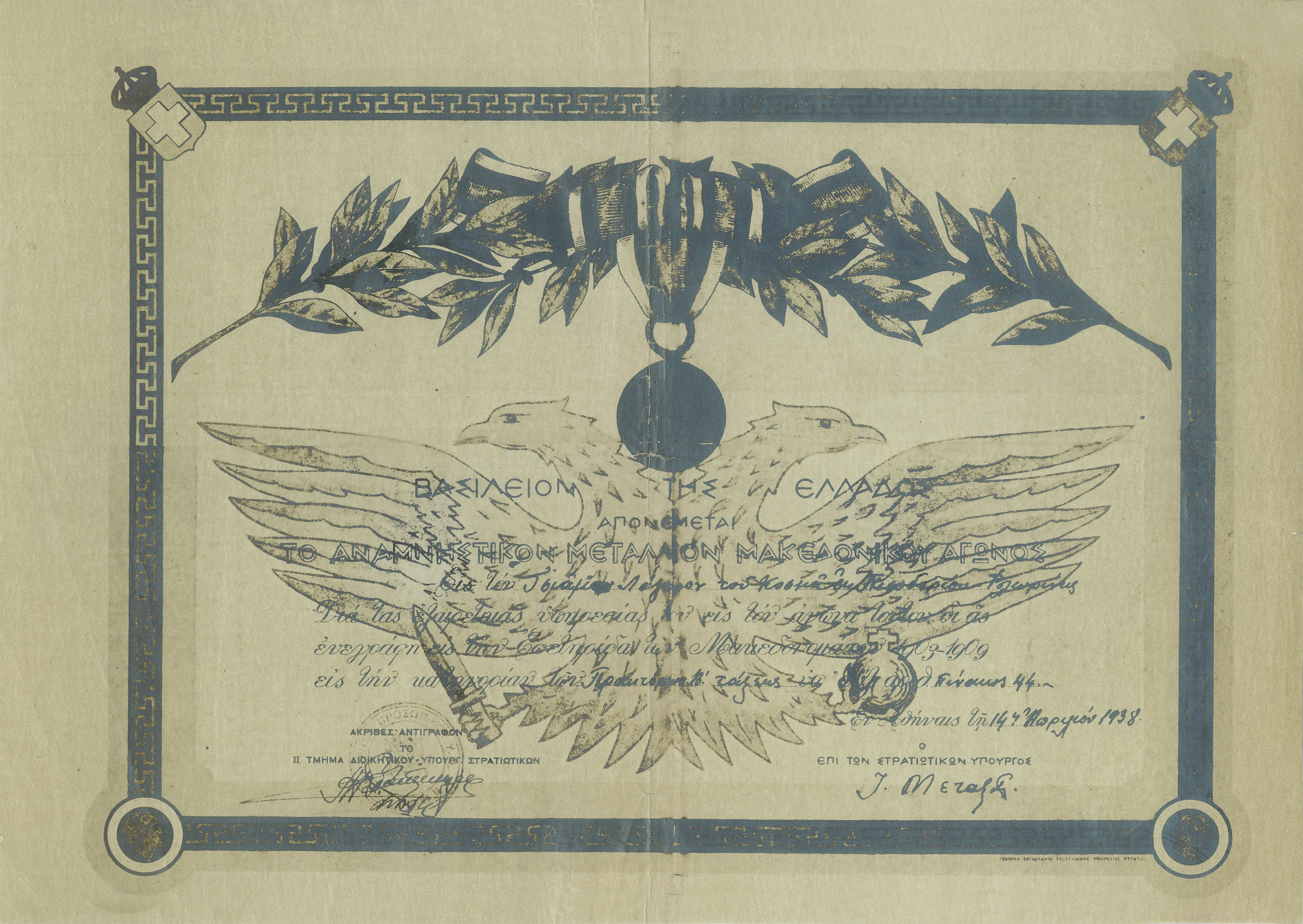
Diploma - award medal of Macedonian Struggle

His bounty had not prevented him from the action, and even the armed action. In August 1904, he hosted the entire group of the Cretan rebel chieftain Efthimios Kaoudis at his home in Pisoderi. On 14 September 1914 the rebel body of Kaoudis fought with Bulgarian rebels in the village of Trigono (Ostima). During the battle, the Greek rebels, were helped by volunteer militants from Pisoderi, including Lazaros Tsamis who by chance escaped death when a bullet wedged in his metal snuff box. The battle ended with the victory of the Greeks and resulted in the death of Voivode Stojan Giagkoula.

That same month, September 1904, the guerrilla group of Efthimios Kaoudi, engaged in battle with the united Bulgarian groups of Mitre the Vlach and Athanas Karsakof. This battle involved a body of fighters from Pisoderi, including Lazaros Tsamis, resulting in the death of nine rebels IMRO and the escape of the others. Later, for his participation in the Battle of Zelovo the Cretan chieftain Pavlos Giparis devoted to Lazaros Tsamis the couplet:

And his brother was, Lazos, lad,
And the two was the most male couple,
I saw them fighting in a day Zelovo
and congratulated brothers, I squeezed the hands with.

Now, singing to them, I can only write,
And I learned to sing all the valiant,
above all those who have killed with bullets.

Two captains from the Greeks were wounded – Ioannis Seimenis and Emmanuel Skountris. The latter, together with three other lightly wounded Greek guerrillas were transferred from Lazaros and Papastavrosto their home in Pisoderi and hospitalized for several months with the care of physician, Stergios Matsalis, sent from the Greek Consulate in Bitola. Emin Efendi, commander of the Turkish Detachment, from Turk-Cretan origin of pro-Greek and friend of Lazaros Tsamis was serving in Pisoderi at that time. When the Greek Consul of Monastiri, Constantinos Dimaras came to Pisoderi, Emin Efendi went secretly to the house of Lazaros and priest Stavros Tsamis to greet the Greek Consul, who stayed overnight there. Upon his departure from the house of Tsami brothers, priest Stavros Tsamis asked Emin Efendi to enter a room where there were four Cretan rebels. Emin Effendi stayed with them the whole night singing gretan mantinades. However, somebody attended to the transfer of Emin Efendi and immediately after that a Turkish Detachment checked the Tsami house three times after anonymous complaints. Lazaros tried and succeeded in restoring contact with the new commander of the Turkish garrison of Pisoderi, Ekrem Efendi. The result of an "understanding" was that Captain Dimitrios Dalipis, deposited four gold coins every first day of each month in the hollow of an old beech tree at the Monastery of the Holy Trinity, to bribe him.

Melas' meeting with Lazaros Tsamis, this time in Macedonia, is described in Pavlos Mela's letter to his wife Natalia Mela in these words, ".. My Nata then came the elders of Pisoderi, excited they kissed me. How to hide their enthusiasm in their breasts these patriots...." It has been reported that Pavlos Melas had sent letters of thanks and the photos of his family to the Tsami brothers, while the latter had high appreciation on his face. On 19 October 1904, shortly after the news of the death of Pavlos Melas, Lazaros Tsamis hastily departed for the village Antartiko (Zelovo), where he met survivors of the group of Pavlos Melas and received from his deputy Lakis Pyrzas all confidential documents brought Paul Melas, which could expose the Greek Government, and he transferred those to Bitola, where he delivered them at the Greek Consulate. Papa-Stavros Tsamis, secretly buried the head of Pavlos Melas inside the sanctuary in the church of Agia Paraskevi Pisoderi. A few days later papa-Stavros confesses to his brother Lazaros the second burial of the head of Pavlos Melas, this time under the sanctuary of the church of Agios Charalampos. The second secret burial was known only to three people.

On November 30, 1904, Lazaros participated, along with 25 volunteers from Pisoderi, in another victorious battle in the village of Antartiko (Zelovo) that gave the captains Georgios Katehakis, Pavlos Giparis and Efthimios Kaoudis with numerous Bulgarian corps under the command of Mitre the Vlach and Athanas Karsakof. During the battle, a Turkish military detachment arrived and the same time has wounded the chieftain Pavlos Giparis. The armed group of Giparis, pursued by the Turkish detachment fled to the dense forest surrounding the monastery of Agia Triada Pisoderi, where they met Lazaros and Papastavros who organized an escape. The chieftain Pavlos Giparis described the episode, in couplets, of as follows:

Three they have been killed and five wounded
There came and the Tsami brothers from Pisoderi,
Papa-Stavro's brother, Lazos, the clever one
We were brought there by the villagers on top of two animals
I admit, we pass the mount Vitsi in riding.

=== Meeting in Pisoderi and his 2nd assassination attempt ===
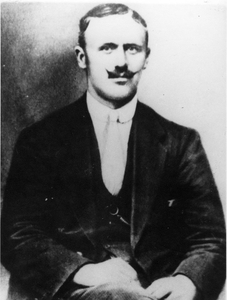
Lazaros Tsamis in a 1914 photograph form the Macedonian Struggle Museum Foundation

In the spring of 1905, after an order from the Greek Consulate of Bitola, Lazaros met the leader of the Greek guerrilla forces in the vilayet of Bitola, Tsondos Vardas in the Kontsiko Anaselitsis. During this meeting Tsontos Vardas delivered to Lazaros, for transmission and distribution, the salaries of all Greek guerrilla groups operating in the region of Korestia and Prespa and documents with instructions for their future actions. On the day of Pentecost in 1904, the Greek Consul in Bitola Nicholas Xydakis asked Lazarus to organize a meeting of all the Greek important figures and captains who were active in the area of Korestia and Prespa, for more coordination of their action. The gathering was organized at the residence of the head of the village of Pisoderi, Nahum Liakos, but the information leaked to the Ottoman administration and military detachments surrounded the village and were awaiting the arrival of the Greek chieftains to arrest them, action that would expose the Greek Consul in Pisoderi. Lazaro's mother, Anastasia Tsamis, managed to get out of the surrounded village and notify promptly the Greek rebels for being Turkish army.

In June 1905, the Greek operations center of Bitola, asked Lazaros to lead the body of chieftain Georgios Alexiou (Makri) from the village of Drosopigi, Florina, where he been received a number of rifles through Korestia to Mount Peristeri, in order to equip the population of the region and to strengthen the body of chieftain Ioannis Karavitis. The mission was carried out successfully and the two bodies were joined at the village of Gradesnitsa Pelagonia and began their joint action. [38]

On 10 September 1905, Lazaros participated with the bodies of chieftains Vardas and Georgios Vlahogiannis (Odysseus) in the victorious battle of Agios Germanos, Prespa. This fact led the Bulgarian revolutionary committee to organize the second assassination attempt of Lazaros. The second week of October 1905, at the 18th km of provincial road Pisoderi–Prespa in a place named Seltsa, was staged a murderous ambush from which Lazarow fled under the pretext that he was an innocent person and that Lazaros was coming behind.

After the failure of his assassination followed the arson of Holy Trinity Monastery, located a few kilometers from Pisoderi, by Bulgarian komitatzides.

It was a convent meeting place and place of organization of Macedonians fighters. The target of arson was to cause the people of Pisoderi and annihilate them. Their plan failed because there was an agreement between Lazaros Tsamis and the chieftain Pavlos Kiru who were in Antartiko (Zelovo) that in this case, Kiru had to help the people of Pisoderi, as it happened in this instance. Kiru has repulsed the Bulgarian rebels but the monastery was destroyed.

=== Murder of his brother and partial blindness ===
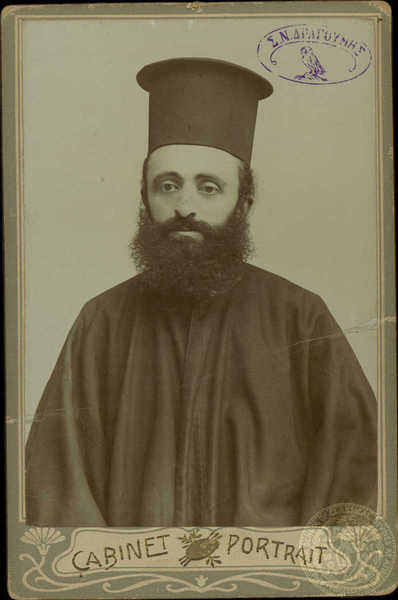
The priest and Macedonian Fighter Stavros Tsamis or Papastavros

On 27 August 1906, Lazaro's brother priest Stavros Tsamis (a.k.a. Papastavros) got a letter with the stamp and signature of Tsontos Vardas, by asking him to join the body of Captain Lukas Bellos at the forest location Lakos. Papa-stavros took with him the Commander of the Turkish Gendarmerie extract Hussein Ibrahim but was murdered by Voivode Kousman Popntinof (Kuzu) in the ambush that had been set up by the fake letter. His brother Lazaros, learn the murderous attack, ran into the woods and saw slaughtered his brother, and probably suffered a nervous breakdown that caused him problems in his sight. The attack was aimed at killing the priest and was documented by exarchate Voivode Stoitsev Kliantsef (Tane), and planned in such way as to find, the Ottoman authorities, coded documents incriminating Papa-stavros and Hussein Ibrahim, and therefore leading to the arrest of Lazaros. The Greek Consulate of Bitola, informed Lazaros that he was wanted and he moved away from the village. Having escaped arrest, he went to Athens, where he received medical assistance from the Macedonian Revolutionary Committee.

During his absence he was tried in absentia by the Ottoman Court of Bitola and was acquitted. He returned to Macedonia in early 1907 and continued the action until the time of the Young Turk Movement in 1908, which marked the end of the hard phase of the Macedonian Struggle because of the belief, at this time, that the liberties of minorities in the Ottoman Empire would be respected. In late July 1908, the Greek guerilla groups in the region of Bitola vilayet took an order from the Greek Consulate of Bitola to discontinue their action, but not to surrender their weapons and withdraw to the mountains. This order of the Greek Consulate conveyed by Lazaros to the rebel group of Simos Ioannidis which at the time was acting in the Pisoderi area. The formation of the Young Turk Parliament had not improved the situation in Macedonia. Soon the hopes of changing the behavior of the Young Turks disappointed. In early September 1908, was established the new organization Panhellenic Organosis with Colonel Panagiotis Daglis as Director General. A circular to ..... especially to all the Offices and Agents .... gives guidance on the operation of the organization and communicated to the agent Lazaros Tsami that ".... in general is under the supervision of the Consuls to announce any such action ..." In 1912, Lazaros as president of the Community of Pisoderi, covered the action of Vasilis Balkos a Greek agent from Arta, initially in the capacity of the Director of Modestos School who was wearing even a priest's robe and subsequently as acting as Director of the Greek Schools of the Florina region assumes the direction of the struggle in the area. Reports later received by the Greek Government on the actions of local rebel bodies by Tsontos Vardas and Special Envoy Vasilios Xirouchas and from Pavlos Giparis, convince the Greek Prime Minister Eleftherios Venizelos that his decision to withdraw the Greek forces from Macedonia was wrong.

== Balkan Wars ==
=== Imprisonment and the Battle of Agios Germanos. ===
During the period just before the outbreak of the First Balkan War, relations between the new regime of the Young Turks and the Greek government deteriorated. The Turks learned about the Greek agents activity in the region and their suspicion turned to Lazaros Tsamis because of his trip to Athens in the summer of 1912. Without any trial they sent him to the prison of Bitola. It is reported that he was beaten and tortured so much that his health deteriorated. During the Balkan War, Serbian troops captured the city of Bitola. Ion Dragoumis, fearing for riots and possible murder of Lazaros went to the convent, released and escorted Lazaros safely to Florina which had recently been liberated by the Greek Army. The General Staff of the Greek Army, in spite of Lazaros fatigue, asked him to guide safely a regiment of evzoni, under Major Georgios Iatridis to the village of Agios Germanos. In the ensuing battle there, Iatridis wiped out the rebel group of Bulgarian Vasil Tsakalarof. After these events, Prince Nicholas as Chief of Staff of the Greek Army presented Lazaros Tsamis a written praise as shown "in the fulfillment of duty in such bravery". Later he was awarded the Medal of the Second Balkan War.

== North Epirus struggle ==
=== Proclamation of the autonomy of Northern Epirus and his armed participation ===
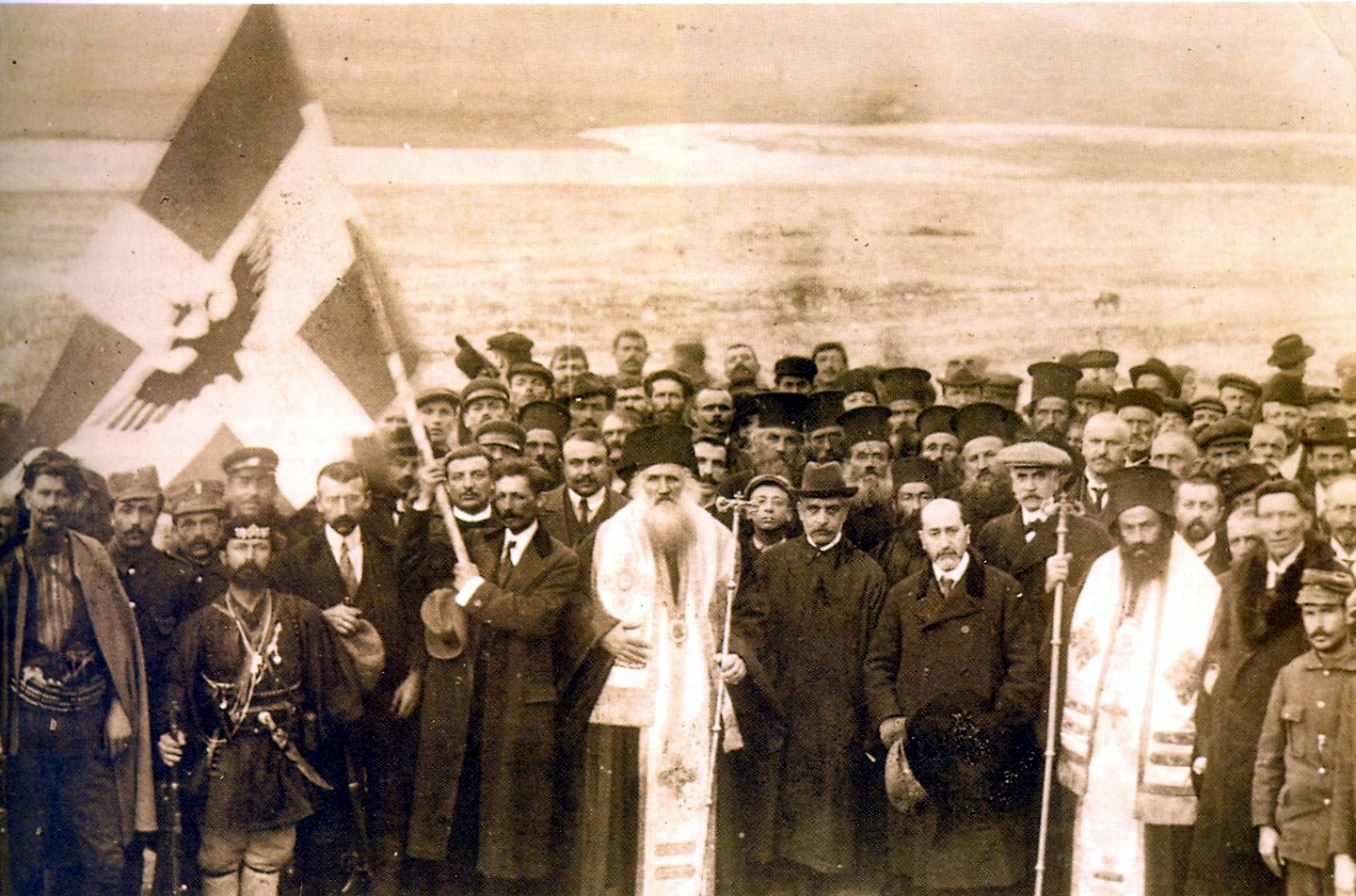
Photo of the official proclamation of the autonomy of Northern Epirus. In the photo, Lazarus Tsamis is second from right behind the Bishop Vasilios.

By the end of the Balkan Wars and the unification of part of Macedonia and Greece, the patriotic action of Lazaros does not stop. The following months he expands its business operations in Bilisht, in Vithkuq and Liqenas the district of Korçë. When, on February 17, 1914, he was proclaimed the autonomy of Northern Epirus, his Epirotic origin called him back in the struggle. He left his family and his commercial stores and on 1 March 1914, was present at the formal proclamation of the autonomy of Northern Epirus in Gjirokastër, posing in photos with old comrades from the Macedonian Struggle and the Balkan Wars, the Prime Minister of the Provisional Government of Northern Epirus Georgios Zografos and the Bishops Dryinoupoleos Vasilios and Vella and Konitsis Spyridon.

Immediately after he joined the Ieros Lochos of Korçë with commanding officer Lt. George Mavratzas. The battles that followed in Bilisht area, and in which Lazaros participated, caused heavy losses. In the battles wounded several fighters from the Macedonian Struggle, as Tsontos Bardas and Pavlos Melas, brother Vasileios Melas. On June 25, 1914, Lazaros with the armed forces of Tsontos Varda and Pavlos Giparis entered the liberated Korçë.

=== Contribution at a critical stage and the Protocol of Corfu ===
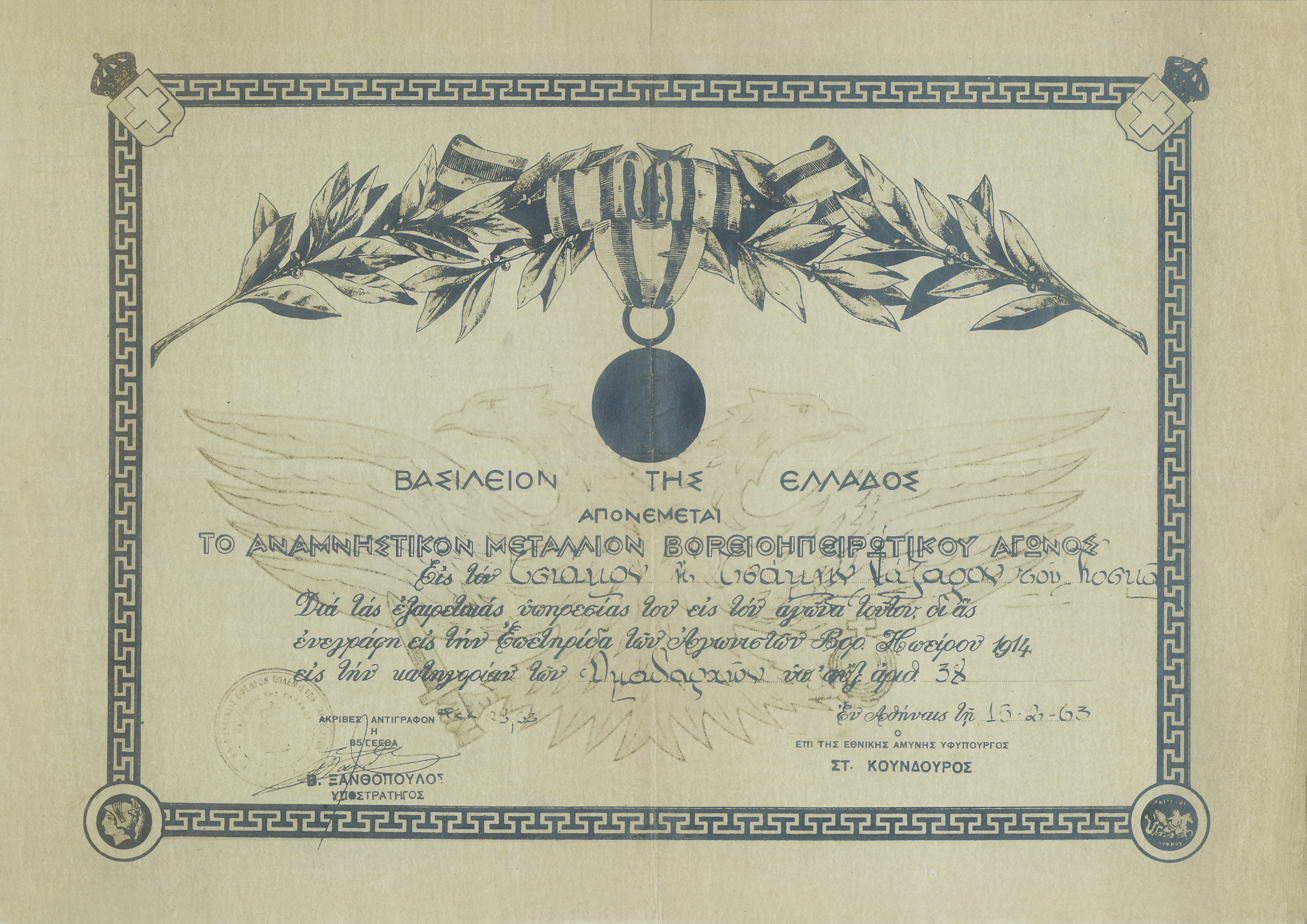
Diploma award medal Northern Epirus Struggle

During that period in Europe, the Great Powers met, to determine the fate of Northern Epirus and the creation of the state of Albania. Crucial information was conveyed by Lazaros Tsamis to the government of Northern Epirus. After the liberation of Korçë, Lazaros met Mrs. Edith Durham in a humanitarian mission, whose point of view towards the Macedonian people during her participation in the British Relief Fund he knew. She appeared to be treating Bulgarian guerrilla groups instead of providing care in a health crisis. Addressing the humanitarian mission after the discovery of the action of the organization from the local ecclesiastical authorities to the Ottoman Administration of Kastoria, could have been a key factor that after the tour of the cities in Vlorë, Durrës, Sarandë and Delvinë and her return to England, an article appeared in The Manchester Guardian newspaper (The Manchester Guardian, was later renamed The Guardian) on 22 July 1914. According to it, during the one-day stay in Korçë and in contact with the Albanian population, found excesses of violence from people from Epirus and the Greek Army against the Albanian element that forced the Albanians to emigrate from the region to Vlorë and Durrës. Very soon she authored a book on the same subject. The article caused a sensation in the British public, but on July 28, 1914, she entered in British politics in the House of Lords, at a critical period of consultation.

On 30 September 1914, the British war correspondent from 1912 to the Balkans Butler (CS Butler) revealed that the lady Edith Durham was impossible to have knowledge of the area because she went through there only one day, and that the Greek troops had already withdrawn behind the Greek-Albanian border from the February of the same year. The only factor associated with the region of Korçë was the immigration of 12,000 Greeks – North Epirotes from Bilisht to Pisoderi and Kastoria.

The revelations changed the attitude of the English public. The signing of the Protocol of Corfu on May 4, 1914, established the autonomy of Northern Epirus confirmed officially July 1, 1914 by the diplomatic missions of the Great Powers, and marked the end of Northern Struggle. The withdrawal of the Greek troops ordered by the Greek government of Venizelos in February 1914, had embitter Lazaros Tsamis, who returned to his hometown and continued to support the Liberal Party. At the same time, his shop in Bilisht burned and completely destroyed.

== First World War and his last years ==
=== Assistance to the French and his 3rd assassination attempt ===
The outbreak of World War I found Greece in a period of national division, as there was intense debate among political factions that supported Eleftherios Venizelos and the participation in the war on the side of the Entente and those who supported the neutrality of the country and King Constantine I. Lazaro's pro–Venizelos sentiments that contradicted the beliefs of his old friends and corevolutionaries during the Macedonian Struggle, led him to join the Movement of National Defence.

When the French General Maurice Sarrail, chief of the allied troops of the Macedonian front, expressed his intention to visit the region of Korestia, to inspect French troops and have a proper understanding of the region and its inhabitants, Lazaros was asked from the Government of National Defence to facilitate the French General's movements in the region. During their personal meeting in the summer of 1916, Lazaros Tsamis explained that the supply of the 125th French Infantry Division and the French Detachment of African Hunters, who had fortified west of Mount Voras, passed through the bottleneck of Vigla, Pisoderi, which closed during the winter months by snow. This information troubled the French General who ordered the construction of a cog railway that connects the village of Alona with Vigla, Pisoderi. The entire construction was ready before the winter of 1917 and the Allied troops did not face any supply problems despite the harsh winter. When the Serbian armed forces were defeated by the Bulgarian army in the Battle of the Crna Bend (1917), Bulgaria occupied the entire region of lakes Ohrid and Prespa.

The invasion of the Bulgarian army in the area in August 1916, resulted in the destruction and looting of Lazaros' grain warehouses in villages Laimos and Karies (Orovnik), all business premises, the fish farms facilities in Prespa, the cheese dairies in Rakiska and Gorica, the looting of his home in Pisoderi and his diesel flour mill in the village of Liqenas. In August 1917 a third assassination was attempted but failed due to his wife Alexandra's quick reaction. Lazaros was forced to leave his family home and settle temporarily for six months at Argos Orestiko in Kastoria, fearing his family's safety. The destruction of his businesses and the cessation of commercial activities led to major economic damage for him.

=== Deterioration of his health and his death ===
Lazaros Tsamis, returning to the area, continued his commercial activity in Florina, where his family moved in 1924. That same year, he divided his business with his friend Hamza Khalil Ntaout Bey (Daut Hamza Halil bey), which manages the joint venture at the very limits of Albanian territory. In 1928, symptoms of eye disease recurred and he was forced to go to Athens. After months of expensive treatment in the ophthalmology clinic of Ioannis Haramis, his vision was preserved to a reasonable degree, but he had been driven to financial ruin. The Office for War Reparations, on May 25, 1932, rejected his request for compensation for damage suffered by his business from 1914 until 1925. He died a few months later in Pisoderi on November 22, 1933, suffering from cancer.

== Honors ==
Lazaros Tsamis was awarded with:

- The National Defence Medal.
- The Macedonian Struggle Medal.
- The Medal of the Second Balkan War.
- The Medal of the Northern Epirus Struggle

Law No. 4413/1929 recognized him, along with 47 others, as Agent Class B of the Macedonian Struggle. Later the Hellenic Republic recognized him as group leader of Northern Epirus Struggle. The municipalities of Pilea, Thessaloniki and Chortiatis have named streets in his honor.

== Sources ==
- Larousse Encyclopædia Britannica Papyrus, Papyrus editions 1993, Volume 58 page 172,
- Douglas Dakin, The Greek Struggle in Macedonia [1897 – 1913], Institute for Balkan Studies, Thessaloniki, 1966, pp. 120, 181, 190, 191, 254.
- Henry Noel Brailsford, Macedonia, The tribes and their future versions of Ulysses, p. 29 ff
- Pavlos Tsamis, Macedonian Struggle, published by the Society for Macedonian Studies, pp. 154, 167, 261,
- P. Andreas Andreou, Kottas, publications Prespa, p 142, ISBN 960-14-0614-X
- Vassos L. Tsamis - Pavlos L. Tsamis The Makedonomachoi brothers Papastavros and Lazarus Cosma Tsamis, Thessaloniki 1956, p 51 ff
- Aristides Kesopoulos The naming of streets of Thessaloniki versions Malliaris, p 276, ISBN 960-239-332-7,
- Journal Manchester Guardian, 22 July 1914 and 30 September 1914 editions
- Archive Antigoni L. Tsamis Formal Certificates of Lazarus Tsamis action issued by Varda Tsontos, George Katechakis, Dikonymos Makris.
- Pavlos Giparis, The Pioneers of the Macedonian Struggle, Athens 1962, pp. 167, 190, 233.

== Bibliography ==
- Eleftherotypia, 1914, The Autonomy of Northern Epirus, ISBN 978-960-9487-83-2
- Apostolos Vakalopoulos, Macedonian Struggle. The armed phase 1904–1908, Thessaloniki 1987
- Army General Staff, Department of History, The Macedonian struggle and events in Thrace, 1979
- University of Western Macedonia, The contribution of Pisoderi in the Macedonian Struggle, Florina 2005
