= Dimitrios Dalipis =

Greek Macedonian fighter and chieftain

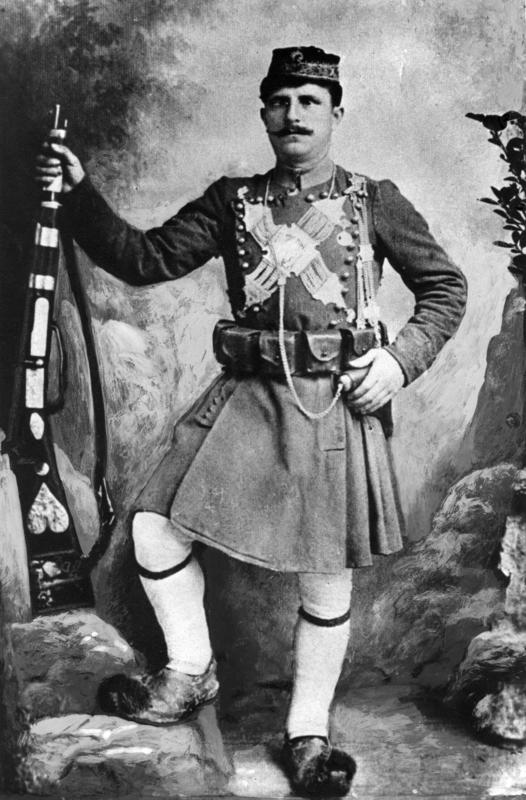
- Dimitrios Dalipis c. 1904
- Native name: Δημήτριος Νταλίπης
- Birth name: Dimitrios Kechagias / Konstantinidis; Δημήτριος Κεχαγιάς / Κωνσταντινίδης
- Born: c. mid 19th century Gavros, Monastir Vilayet, Ottoman Empire (now Greece)
- Died: 19 November 1906 Zelovo, Monastir Vilayet, Ottoman Empire (now Antartiko, Greece)
- Allegiance: IMRO (1903); Kingdom of Greece
- Branch: HMC
- Battles / wars: Macedonian Struggle †; Ilinden Uprising; Battle of Zelovo
- Children: Anastasios Dalipis

Dimitrios Kechagias (Greek: Δημήτριος Κεχαγιάς; Gavros, Korestia, 19th century – Zelovo, Florina, 19 November 1906) or Konstantinidis (Greek: Κωνσταντινίδης), known under the pseudonym Dimitrios Dalipis (Greek: Δημήτριος Νταλίπης), was a Greek chieftain of the Macedonian Struggle.

== Biography ==
Dimitrios Dalipis, son of Konstantinos, was born in the middle of the 19th century in Gavros, in what was the Monastir Vilayet of the Ottoman Empire, to a family of stock farmers. He was a slavophone and his family's real last name was Kechagias. He took on the pseudonym "Dalipis" from the famous klepht and revolutionary Stefanos Dalipis, one of the leaders of the 1878 Macedonian rebellion. He was one of the most powerful chieftains in Korestia fighting for the Greek side. He initially joined the IMRO during the Ilinden Uprising. However, he later left the organisation when it turned against the Greek population. He entered the service of the Hellenic Macedonian Committee where he initially cooperated with Kottas Christou and then with Pavlos Melas. After the latter's death in 1904, he cooperated consecutively with Georgios Katechakis, Efthymios Kaoudis and Ioannis Karavitis. In 1905, he and Katechakis took part in the battle of Zelovo with Pavlos Kyrou. In November of the same year, he cooperated with Georgios Tsontos.

He was killed on 19 November 1906 in an engagement with the Ottoman Army or in a Bulgarian ambush in Zelovo, Florina, at Asvou Rachi (The Badger's Back).

His son was Anastasios Dalipis, a colonel of the Hellenic Army who later served as deputy minister of Northern Greece in the Dimitrios Maximos government, and member of EEE.
