= National Organization of Crete =

Former resistance movement in Crete

National Organization of Crete Εθνική Οργάνωση Κρήτης Ethnikí Orgánosi Krítis
- Leaders: Andreas Papadakis; Nikolaos Skoulas
- Dates active: 1943–1944
- Headquarters: Chania
- Active regions: Crete
- Ideology: Greek nationalism Venizelism; Antifascism
- Part of: Greek Resistance
- Wars: World War II

The National Organization of Crete (Greek: Εθνική Οργάνωση Κρήτης, Ethnikí Orgánosi Krítis (EOK)) was a resistance organization established in the island of Crete with the cooperation and encouragement of British Intelligence during the Axis occupation of Greece in World War II. It was the main resistance force in Crete.

== Establishment and ideology ==
EOK was established in June 1943 with the aid of Tom Dunbabin, then SOE Field Commander on Crete. Predominantly Venizelist in sympathy and with members ranging from centre-left to right-wing, EOK was meant to act as a counterweight to the pro-communist EAM resistance organization. EOK evolved from the secret organization AEAK (Greek: Ανώτατη Επιτροπή Αγώνα Κρήτης, "Supreme Committee of Cretan Struggle"), that was established in Chania on June 15, 1941. AEAK was founded a mere two weeks after the end of the Battle of Crete by patriots Andreas Papadakis, Ioannis Paizis, Andreas Polentas, Titos Georgiadis and Ioannis Ioannidis. It was the first armed resistance group in Greece, intending to organize an intelligence network and perform sabotage against German occupation forces. During the first months following its establishment, AEAK was based at Colonel Papadakis' house in Vourvoures, near Kallikratis. EOK was initially headed by Nikolaos Skoulas, Charidimos Polychronidis, Iosif Voloudakis, Emmanouil Basias and Markos Spanoudakis. Skoulas had joined AEAK shortly after its formation and had closely collaborated with the SOE, supplying it with fake documents while also acting as the German appointed mayor of Chania.

Despite their ideological differences, EAM and EOK agreed to sign non-aggression pacts during the meetings of Theriso (7/11/1943) and Tromarissa (15/9/1944). These agreements were generally respected and allowed Crete to remain largely unaffected by the civil war between leftists and rightists that broke out in mainland Greece after the withdrawal of German occupation forces.

== Sources ==
- Koukounas, Demosthenes (2013). Η Ιστορία της Κατοχής [History of the Occupation] (in Greek). Vol. II. Athens: Livani. ISBN 978-960-14-2687-7.
