= Murder of Manolis Papadosifos =

1983 murder in Greece

- Died: August 7, 1983
- Cause of death: Murder

Manolis Papadosifos (1955 or 1956 - August 7, 1983) was a Greek citizen of Rethymno, that was murdered on August 7, 1983, by Giannis Venierakis. Venierakis was sentenced to life in prison. On December 20, 1988, Papadosifos's father, Giannis, shot and killed Venierakis during the trial. He was sentenced to 14 years in prison on a charge of premeditated murder. He was released 5 years later and continued to live in Rethymno, until his death in 2012.

== Information of those involved ==
Few things are known to us, both about Papadosifos and about Venierakis. Considering that Papadosifos was 27 years old at the time of his assassination (August 7, 1983), he should have been born in 1955 or 1956. It is reported that Papadosifos knew languages other than Greek and played the piano, other information about his childhood and other aspects of his life until his murder (when and where he was born, etc.) are not known to us. Venierakis, on the other hand, was referred to as a "bully", 37 years old at the time of Manolis' murder (he may have been born in 1946), but other details are also unknown.

== Assassination of Papadosifos ==
According to Papadosifos's own father, the two children were close friends and regularly visited each other's house. But after a while, Venierakis became involved in "dirty work", and as a result he lost a lot of his friends. A short time later, a woman appears to have appeared in the lives of the two young men, resulting in frequent quarrels. The two young people met at the fatal moment in a cafe in Rethymno. The two young men were found in the attic of the store, where a few minutes later Venierakis fatally shot Manolis Papadosifos four times in the chest. Manolis's father, Giannis, was notified, and rushed to the hospital to see him. But it was too late; Manolis Papadosifos was already dead when he arrived at the hospital.

== Assassination of Venierakis ==
Venierakis was arrested by the authorities and sentenced at first instance to life imprisonment. But due to fears of possible incidents between the two families, it was decided to hold the trial in Athens. It was December 20, 1988, when the trial of Venierakis began at the Piraeus Court of Appeal. During the trial, Giannis Papadosifos got up and shot Venierakis five times with a gun. When Venierakis fell down dead, Papadosifos calmed down, but was sentenced to 14 years on the charge of premeditated murder. His sentence was later reduced to eight years and he was released from prison 5 years after he was sentenced. He never regretted the murder of Venierakis, characteristically stating that "He would kill him again, if he came back to life".

== The "paradox" of the weapon ==
How he hid the weapon with which Papadosifos killed his son's killer, was a matter of discussion. Specifically, the weapon was a German luger, which he had snatched from a Wehrmacht soldier during the Battle of Crete, together with his father. He never revealed where he hid it, (in an interview he simply stated "I had it on me"). However, according to a popular urban legend, while the police were regularly looking for him for a gun, they did not look for his beard (probably out of respect) which he had left out of mourning. There, according to the hypothesis, he had hidden the weapon that killed Venierakis.

== Giannis Papadosifos ==
Giannis Papadosifos (1925 - May 2, 2012) was born in Kallikratis, Chania (Sfakia Province), but later moved to Mysiria, Rethymnon. At the age of 15-16 he fought in the Battle of Crete with his father, from where he procured the famous pistol with which he killed Giannis Venierakis, along with another pistol, a rifle, a cartridge case and a parachute. He married and had four children. He died on May 2, 2012, at the age of 87.
