= Traianos Liantzakis =

Greek chieftain of the Greek Struggle for Macedonia

- Τραϊανός Λιαντζάκης
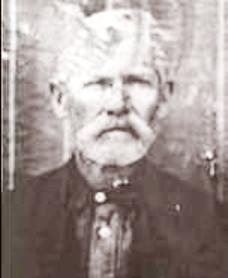
- Traianos Liantzakis during the Macedonian Struggle
- Born: c. 1850s Zelovo, Monastir Vilayet, Ottoman Empire (now Antartiko, Greece)
- Relatives: Georgios Liantzakis Simos Liantzakis and Michael Liantzakis (Brothers)
- Military career
- Allegiance: Kingdom of Greece
- Branch: HMC
- Conflicts: Macedonian Struggle

Traianos (Traikos) Liantzakis (Greek: Τραϊανός Λιαντζάκης) or Lantzakis was a Greek chieftain of the Greek Struggle for Macedonia.

== Biography ==
He was born in the 1850s in Zelovo, Ottoman Empire (now Antartiko, Greece). He was a Kodjabashi of his village and with his brothers, Georgios, Simos and Michael he struggled to repel the early Bulgarian activities near the village. Along with Naoum and Pavlos Kyrou they assisted in the exterminatation of Komitadji Lazar Poptraykov, who was a high-ranked member of the Bulgarian Committee of the regions of Florina and Kastoria in 1903.

On 14 September 1904, Efthymios Kaoudis with his armed group entered Zelovo, where they met with Anastasios and Filippos Stefos, who asked them to provide them guns to make an armed group. The people of Zelovo though, suspected Kaoudis of being assosicated with IMRO or something related and demanded him and his group to leave the village, even after Pavlos Kyrou ensured them that Kaoudis is not what they believe. The misunderstanding had to be solved by Liantzakis, who as the representor of the village went to Monastir to get insurance from the Greek consul that Kaoudis was acting under the general orders of the Greek state which he was.

In the same year Liantzakis set up an armed group and acted in the regions of Prespa and Korestia against Bulgarian Komitadjis until the end of the Macedonian Struggle in 1908.
