= Andreas Polentas =

Andreas Polentas (Greek: Ανδρέας Πολέντας; 1908 – 23 December 1942) was a Greek partisan executed by the Germans during the Axis occupation of Greece in World War II.

== Early years ==
Andreas Polentas was born in 1908 in Sfakia, Crete to parents Pavlos Polentas and Anna Mpolioti. His father was a merchant and around 1915 he moved with his family to Vryses. Polentas graduated with honors from Vamos High School and then enrolled in the Law School of Athens.

Although an admirer of Eleftherios Venizelos, Polentas came into conflict with the Venizelists due to the enactment of the Idionymon law that restricted the activities of workers and students. During his studies, the 4th of August Regime was imposed, with which Polentas clashed. He was thus forced to suspend his studies and return to Crete, where he fled to the White Mountains. After the declaration of the Greco-Italian War on 28 October 1940, Polentas enlisted in the Greek army and served on the Albanian front.

== German Occupation & Resistance ==
After the collapse of the front and the occupation of Crete by the Germans, Polentas returned to Vryses. At the beginning of June 1941, he met with Colonel Andreas Papadakis, a veteran of the Asia Minor campaign. During this meeting, held at Vourvoures, between Asi Gonia and Kallikratis, Polentas proposed the establishment of a resistance organization. The proposal was enthusiastically endorsed by Papadakis. Thus, on 15 June 1941, the charter of the Supreme Committee of Cretan Struggle (A.E.A.K.), which was prepared by Polentas, was signed in Chania. AEAK was the first resistance organization in all of Greece.

The statute of AEAK appointed Dr. Ioannis Paizis as its representative for Chania, Col. Andreas Papadakis for Rethymno, Titos Georgiadis for Heraklion and Ioannis Ioannidis for Lasithi, while Polentas himself was appointed general secretary. In a very short time, Polentas founded fraternities and swore representatives as a result of which the whole of Apokoronas was organized. At the same time, in cooperation with the representatives of the four prefectures, he liaised with Allied agents, established armed resistance groups and organised the evacuation of Allied troops to Egypt.

== Death ==
On 14 November 1942, Andreas Polentas invited the organization's representatives to a meeting in Vryses. However, the Germans who were informed of the meeting by Georgios Komnas, arrested Polentas and imprisoned him in Agia. After long interrogations and torture, Polentas along with Manousos Megalakakis and the radio operator Apostolos Evangelou were led to the firing squad on 23 December 1942, but did not give away their comrades. Komnas was sentenced to death in absentia by the Revolutionary Military Court of Crete and a group of guerrillas undertook the execution of the sentence, stabbing him in his house in Chania.

A bust of Polentas has been erected in Vryses.
