= Pavlos Kyrou =

Slavophone Greek revolutionary

- Παύλος Κύρου; Павел Киров
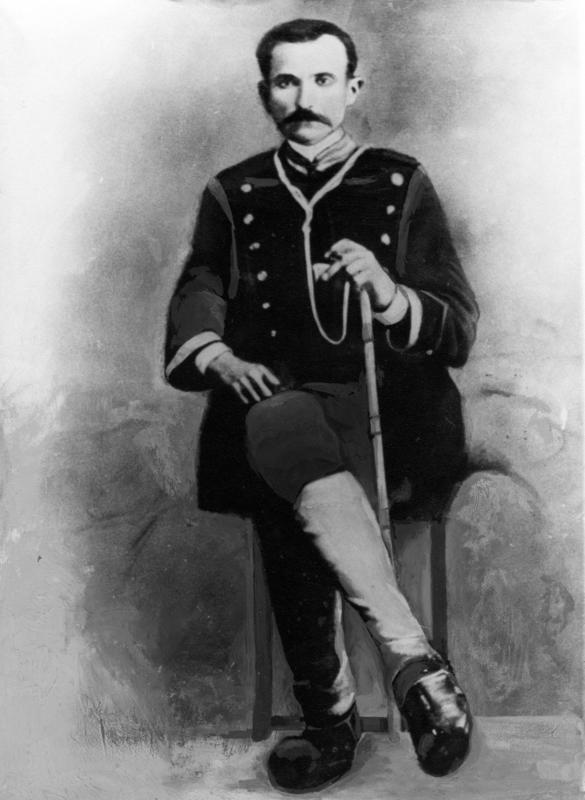
- Pavlos Kyrou c. 1904
- Born: c. 1860s Zelovo, Monastir Vilayet, Ottoman Empire (now Antartiko, Greece)
- Died: 19 November 1904
- Relatives: Naoum Kyrou (Grandfather)
- Military career
- Allegiance: IMRO (until 1903); Kingdom of Greece
- Branch: HMC
- Service years: 1881-1904
- Conflicts: Macedonian Struggle †; Ilinden Uprising

Pavlos Kyrou (Greek: Παύλος Κύρου) was a Slavophone Greek revolutionary who participated in the Ilinden Uprising with the IMRO and the Greek Struggle for Macedonia.

== Early life ==
Kyrou was born in the 1860s in Zelovo (renamed Antartiko in 1927) of Florina. He was the grandson of the well known klepht Naoum Kyrou. He was able to speak both Greek and Bulgarian fluently. He graduated from the local Greek school of his hometown and began to join armed bands where in 1881, he was involved in the kidnapping of the Turkish prefect of Florina.

== Macedonian Struggle ==
Following a long trip to Athens, Kyrou returned to Macedonia to restart his armed activities along with Kottas, fighting with the Bulgarian Komitadjis against the Ottoman authorities. Kyrou had the capability of knowing almost all of Western Macedonia and its paths and had many cooperators and friends from all over it. As a member of the pro-Bulgarian IMRO he participated in the preparation and execution of the Ilinden uprising of 1903. Following the uprising, Kyrou and Kottas discovered the true intentions of the IMRO against the Greek population, causing their defection to the Greek side. In 1903-04 he travelled to Athens with Kottas to recruit volunteers for the struggle. He returned to cooperate with Germanos Karavangelis and Pavlos Melas.

Pavlos Melas wrote in a letter of his on 12 March 1904 about Kyrou:

«You can't imagine what a curious guy Pavlos is. His kindness is unique. Our Cretans worship and tease him. The cigarette does not come out of his mouth and one of his pleasures is telling us without laughing the games he was playing with the Bulgarians. He has a unique pride in everything, but especially in associating with the best, and most appropriate, people in his work. He has good and loyal friends in all villages».

Following the arrest and execution of Kottas, he returned to Athens to organize his own armed group that would function in the Prespa region. He cooperated with other chieftains, such as Dimitrios Dalipis, Kottas, Traianos Liantzakis, Ioannis Karavitis, Nikolaos Pyrzas, and especially Efthymios Kaoudis, who would not make a single move without the approval of Kyrou.

He was killed in action along with Dalipis on 19 November 1906, during a battle against the armed groups of Mitre the Vlach and Pando Klyashev.

== Legacy ==
He ranks among the heroes of the Macedonian Struggle in Greece.

His son, Lazaros, also became a chieftain and continued the fight following his father's death.

There is a bust and memorial to him in his birth place of Antartiko.

In Bulgaria he is regarded as a turncoat Bulgarian, a renegade from the IMRO.

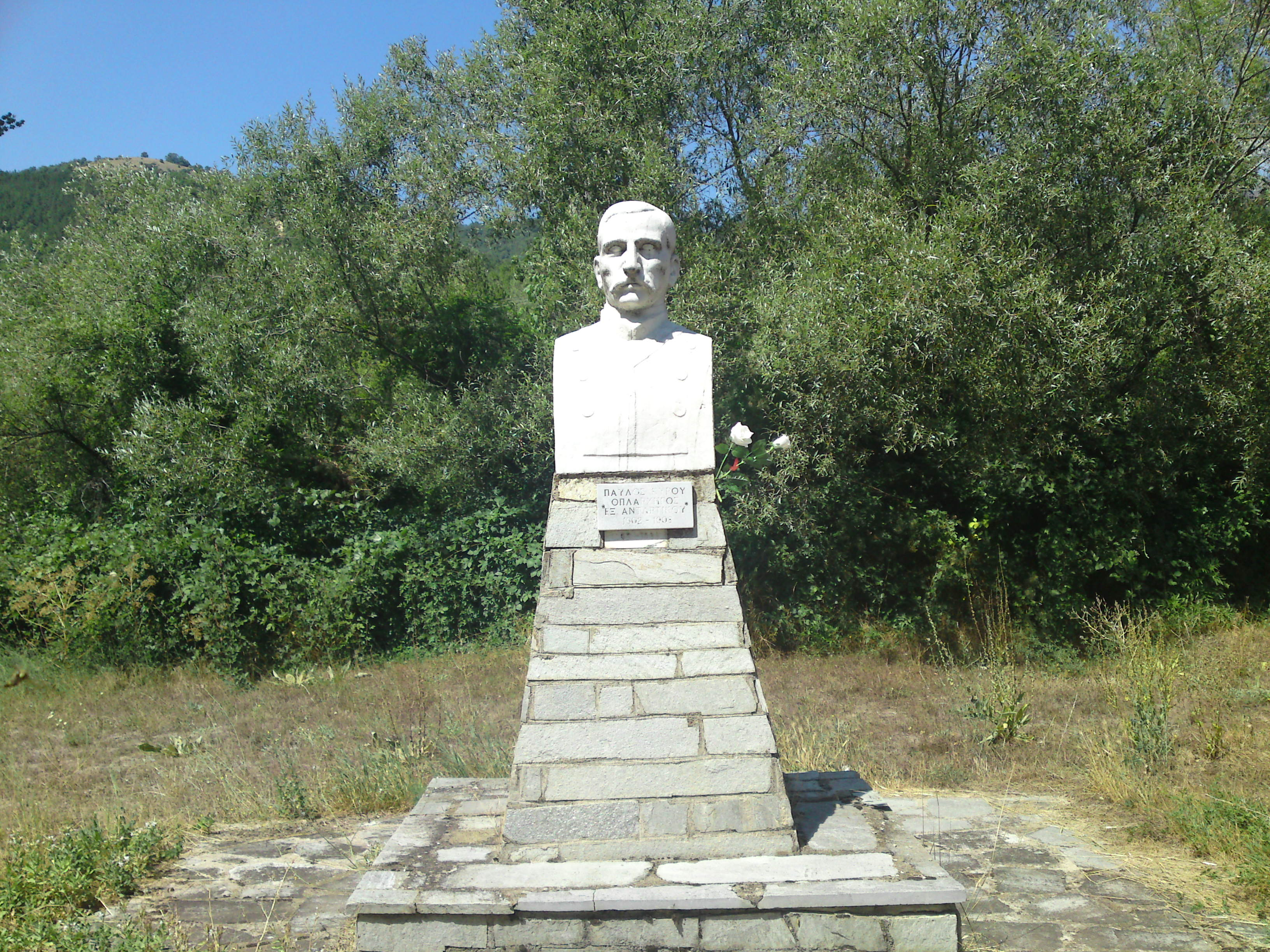
Bust of Pavlos Kyrou in Antartiko.

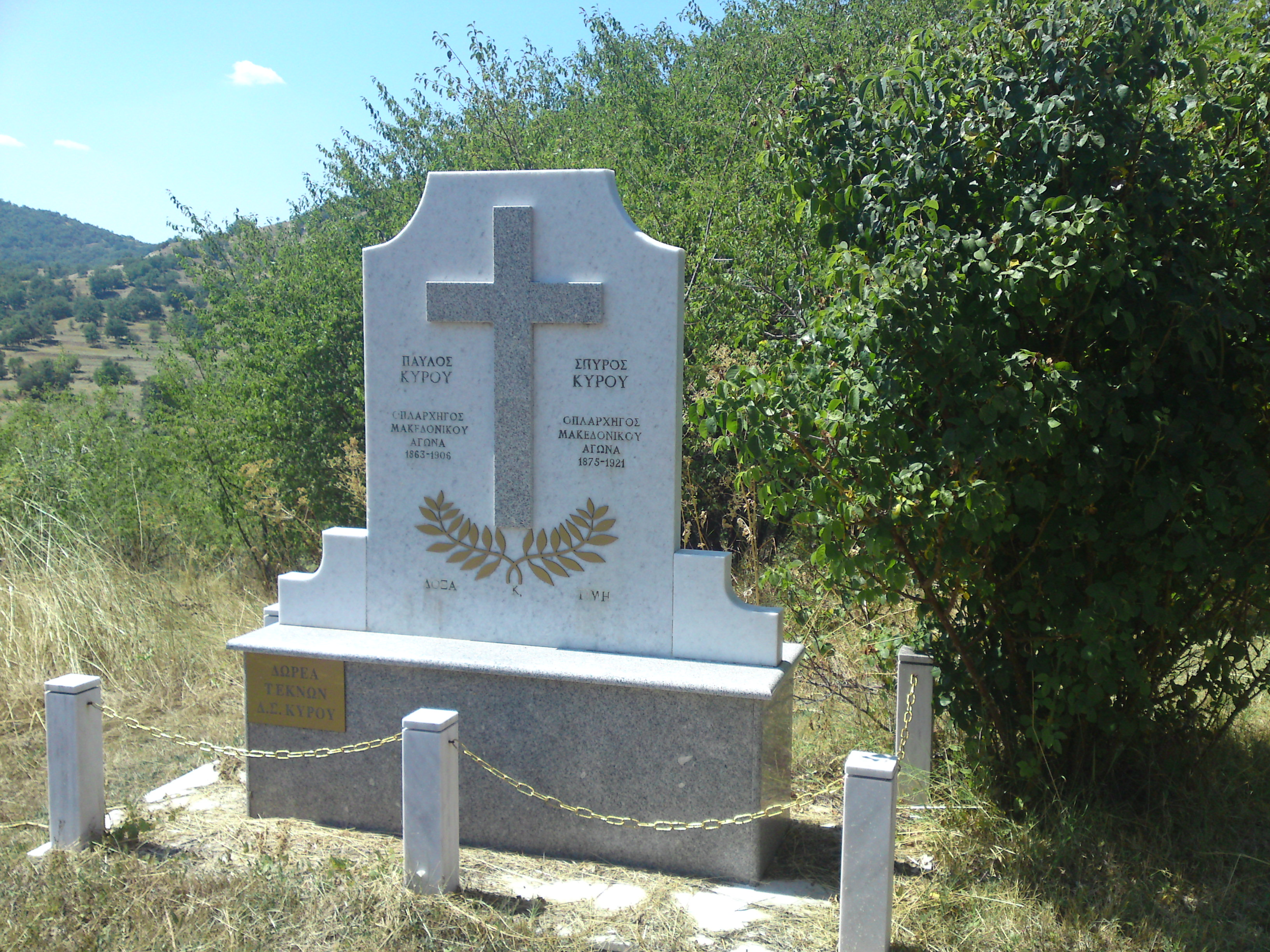
Memorial to Pavlos Kyrou and his brother Spyros in Antartiko.
