= George Psychoundakis =

Greek Resistance member on Crete

George Psychoundakis when he was in the Cretan resistance

George Psychoundakis BEM (Greek: Γεώργιος Ψυχουντάκης; 3 November 1920 – 29 January 2006) was a member of the Greek Resistance on Crete during the Second World War and after the war an author. Following the German invasion, between 1941 and 1945, he served as the dispatch runner for the Special Operations Executive (SOE) operations on Crete, as part of the Cretan resistance. During the postwar years he was at first mistakenly imprisoned as a deserter. While in prison he wrote his wartime memoirs, which were published as The Cretan Runner. Later he translated key classical Greek texts into the Cretan dialect.

He had been a shepherd before the war and after it a charcoal burner and later caretaker of the German military cemetery on Crete.

== Early life ==
George Psychoundakis was born in Asi Gonia (Greek: Ασή Γωνιά), a village of a few hundred people high in the Mouselas valley in western Crete. The village was not serviced by a road until the 1950s. He was the penultimate son of Nicolas and Angeliké. One of the poorest families in the village, they lived in a one-room home with an earth floor. After a minimum of education in the village school, he became a shepherd, tending his family's few sheep and goats. He developed an intimate knowledge of his part of the island.

During the Second World War, people used the caves to live in and to store weapons. They traveled the goat tracks to carry messages, goods and people. Crete had a tradition of resistance to rule by outsiders; the island had, about 40 years previously in 1898, obtained its independence from the Ottoman Empire. Numerous insurrections during the long occupation, together with the mountainous terrain, helped maintain an independence of character and willingness to bear and use arms.

== Wartime service ==
Cover of The Cretan Runner, Penguin Books, 1998

As an airborne Nazi invasion began on 20 May 1941, Psychoundakis immediately went to the nearest town (Episkopi, Rethymno) about 15 km away. He took part in an ill-armed resistance to the invasion. The Cretans hid many hundreds of British and other Allied soldiers left behind, and the resistance organised their movement to the south coast. From there the British were shipped to Egypt. Psychoundakis helped in guiding groups from village to village. By the autumn of 1941, the SOE were beginning to organise with British liaison officers on the island, one of whom was Patrick Leigh Fermor. He arrived clandestinely by sea in July 1942. Psychoundakis acted as Fermor's runner, carrying messages between resistance groups and guiding parties unfamiliar with the territory.

Leigh Fermor described the man in his introduction to The Cretan Runner:

When the moon rose he got up and threw a last swig of raki down his throat with the words Another drop of petrol for the engine, and loped towards the gap in the bushes with the furtiveness of a stage Mohican or Groucho Marx. He turned round when he was on all fours at the exit, rolled his eyes, raised a forefinger portentously, whispered, "the Intelligence Service", and scuttled through like a rabbit. A few minutes later we could see his small figure a mile away moving across the next moonlit fold of the foothills of the White Mountains, bound for another fifty-mile journey.

The Cretan runners performed exceptional feats and made essential contributions to the British operations in the Mediterranean. In 490 BC Pheidippides ran 42 km from the battle of Marathon to tell about the victory over the Persians, and died just after delivering his message. In comparison, Psychoundakis ran from Kastelli-Kissamou on the northwestern coast of Crete to Paleochora on the southwestern coast in one night. The distance along the present main road is 45 km. Through a rugged landscape with deep ravines, where he had to run to avoid the Germans, the distance may have been twice as far.

The resistance fighters faced baking Cretan summers and severely cold winters, particularly in the hills. Food was often short and fighters suffered from hiding in cold, dripping caves with deep snow outside. The island's fighters were never put to the ultimate test; they had hoped Crete might be a starting point for the invasion of southern Europe. The island was liberated in 1945. The British offered Psychoundakis payment for his work, but he turned them down. He said that he had worked for his country and not for money.

== Postwar life ==
Book covers of Psychoundakis' translations of the Iliad and Odyssey to the Cretan dialect.

After the liberation of Crete, Psychoundakis was arrested as a deserter and was confined for 16 months despite having been honoured by the British with a BEM (Medal of the Order of the British Empire for Meritorious Service) and £200 for his services during the war. While in confinement he wrote his memories of service in the SOE and the Cretan resistance movement. His former superior Patrick Leigh Fermor, later Sir Patrick, discovered his plight by accident and managed to secure his release by clearing up the misunderstanding.

After reading his manuscript, Leigh Fermor translated it into English, and assisted in getting it published, under the title The Cretan Runner in 1955. The book has since been translated into a number of European languages. After his release from prison, Psychoundakis was first forced to fight in the civil war. Then he worked as a charcoal burner in the Cretan mountains to support his family until his book was published. During this period, he wrote the book The Eagle's Nest, which deals with the life and customs of the mountain people in the villages near his home of Asi Gonia. This book was translated into English by Dr Barrie Machin, the social anthropologist, who worked with Psychoundakis in 1967 and 1968 on an anthropological study of Asi Gonia. Machin returned on numerous occasions to work with Psychoundakis, and they became very close friends. Machin made a video based on his research, Warriors and Maidens: Gender Relations in a Cretan Mountain Village (1988). Psychoundakis was a natural anthropologist as well as a gifted writer, with a phenomenal memory. His poverty was so great that he could not even afford pen and paper. In 1968 Machin left him a pile of 5" by 4" cards and pens so he could write. He started his translation of the Iliad that year.

Psychoundakis made considerable contributions to Cretan culture. He learned much of Crete's tradition of oral poetry and also wrote. Psychoundakis translated Homer's works, Iliad (560 pages) and Odyssey (474 pages), from ancient Greek into Cretan dialect. For this he was honoured by the Academy of Athens.

From 1974 until his retirement, Psychoundakis, together with another fighter in the Greek resistance, Manolis Paterakis, were caretakers at the German war cemetery on Hill 107 above Maleme. George Psychoundakis buried Bruno Brauer when he was re-interred on Crete later in the 1970s.

He died on 29 January 2006.

== Sources ==
- Dillon, John, "The Cretan Runner: George Psychoundakis story", Battle of Crete, UK: My Crete, archived from the original on 3 March 2016
- Helland, Frode Inge (11 October 2005), "Personal interview with Georgio Psychoundakis", Chania.
- George Psychoundakis obituary, Times Online, 23 February 2006.
- George Psychoundakis obituary, The Daily Telegraph, 18 February 2006.
- George Psychoundakis obituary, The Guardian, 21 February 2006.
- The Trireme Trust – Newsletter 18

== Bibliography ==
- Psychoundakis, George (1991) [1955], The Cretan Runner: His Story of the German Occupation, Fermor, PL transl, ISBN 0-7195-3475-5
- Ομήρου Ιλιάδα, Ψυχουντάκης, Γεώργιος. Πανεπιστημιακές Εκδόσεις Κρήτης, Ηράκλειο 2003. ISBN 978-960-7309-92-1
- Ομήρου Οδύσσεια, Ψυχουντάκης, Γεώργιος. Πανεπιστημιακές Εκδόσεις Κρήτης, Ηράκλειο 2003. ISBN 978-960-524-020-2
- Αετοφωλιές στην Κρήτη: Λαογραφία της Ασή-Γωνιάς. Γεώργιος Ψυχουντάκης, Δημοτική Πολιτιστική Επιχείρηση Χανίων. Χανιά 1999.
- Ησίοδου Έργα και Ημέραι: σε έμμετρη μετάφραση. Γεωργίου Ψυχουντάκη, ΕΚΔΟΣΕΙΣ ΕΡΕΙΣΜΑ
