= Pavlos Gyparis =

Greek guerilla and army officer (1882–1966)

- Παύλος Γύπαρης
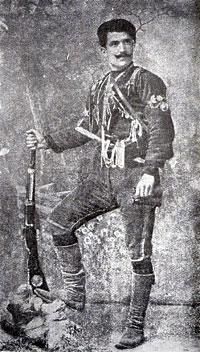
- Pavlos Gyparis during the Macedonian Struggle

Member of Parliament for Chania Prefecture
- In office 14 – 26 April 1944
- Monarch: George II
- Prime Minister: Sofoklis Venizelos

Personal details
- Born: 1882 Asi Gonia, Eyalet of Crete, Ottoman Empire (now Greece)
- Died: 22 June 1966 (aged 83–84) Athens, Kingdom of Greece
- Party: Liberal Party

Military service
- Allegiance: Kingdom of Greece; French Third Republic; Second Hellenic Republic
- Branch/service: Hellenic Army; French Army
- Battles/wars: Macedonian Struggle; Balkan Wars; First Balkan War; Liberation of Samos; Second Balkan War; World War I; Western Front; Macedonian front; World War II; Battle of Greece; Battle of Crete; Greek Civil War

Pavlos Iosif Gyparis (Greek: Παύλος Ιωσήφ Γύπαρης, 1882 – 22 July 1966) was a Hellenic Army officer best known as the commander of the personal guard of Prime Minister Eleftherios Venizelos. He took part in many conflicts, and in 1920 was implicated in the assassination of Ion Dragoumis, a political opponent of Venizelos.

== Biography ==
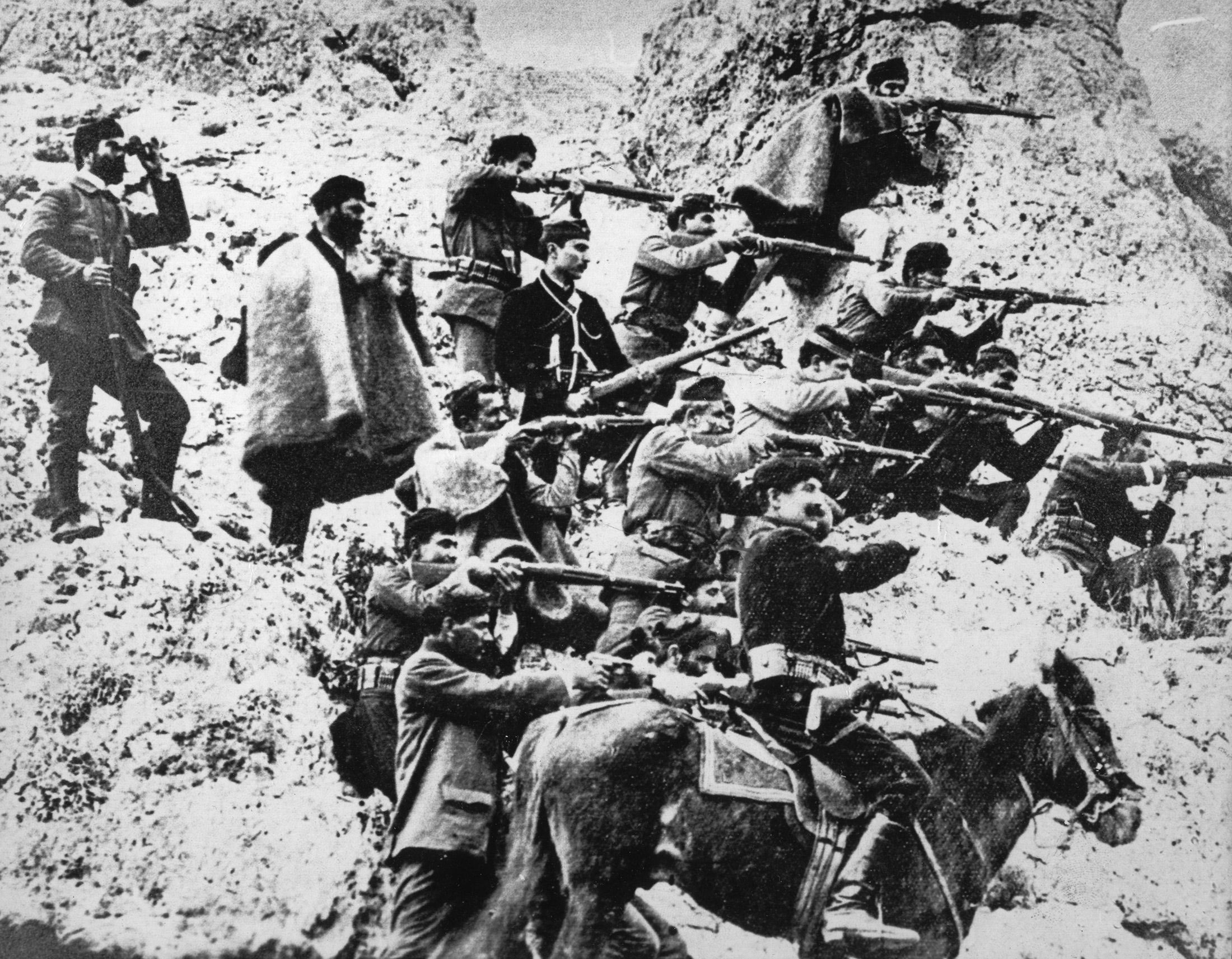
The band of Gyparis during the Macedonian Struggle.

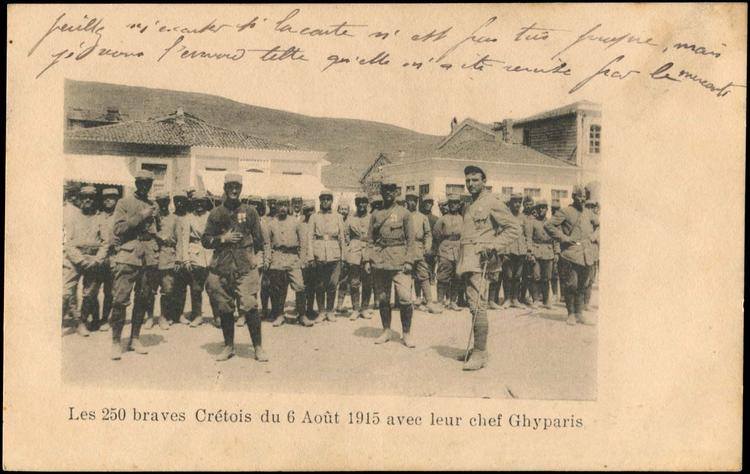
Gyparis and the Cretan volunteers in the French Army c. 1915

Born in the Cretan village of Asi Gonia in 1882, as a young man Gyparis took part in paramilitary activities against Turkish, Bulgarian and Romanian interests during the Macedonian Struggle, with great success. Later, during the Balkan Wars, he organized the liberation of the island of Samos from the Ottomans. In 1915, he organized a volunteer corps of Cretans that fought for France in Alsace. After Greece's entry into World War I he fought in the Macedonian front in 1917-18.

In 1920, during a time when the political situation in Greece was extremely polarized between supporters of Prime Minister Eleftherios Venizelos on the one hand, and supporters of the Royal Family on the other, Gyparis was accused of organizing a paramilitary force, the so-called "Democratic Security Battalions", that murdered Ion Dragoumis, one of Venizelos' fiercest political rivals. However, this was never proven in court.

During the Axis occupation of Greece he fled to the Middle East and joined the forces of the Greek government-in-exile. During the Greek Civil War, Gyparis was active in his home island of Crete, fighting against the communists. He was also elected an MP with the party of Sofoklis Venizelos, the son of Eleftherios.

He died in 1966 and he stayed at Ampelokipoi, Athens.

Georgios Papandreou praised him as a fighter for democracy on the side of Venizelos.
