= Anastasios Dalipis =

Greek politician (1896–1949)

Personal details
- Born: 1896 Gavros, Kastoria
- Died: 15 July 1949 (aged 52–53) Athens
- Profession: Military officer / Surveying Engineer / Politician

Anastasios Dalipis (Greek: Αναστάσιος Νταλίπης; 1896–1949), usually referred as Tasos Dalipis, was a Greek Army officer and politician, who was elected many times as a member of the Greek Parliament and served as Minister Governor-General of Western Macedonia from 1946 to 1947.

== Early life ==
Anastasios Dalipis was born in 1896 in the village of Gavros in modern Kastoria municipality, then part of the Manastir Vilayet of the Ottoman Empire.

He was the second son of the captain of the Macedonian Struggle Dimitris Dalipis, who operated in the Korestia area, and was killed fighting against the Bulgarian komitadji and the Ottoman army on 19 November 1906 in the Asvos hill of Korestia, on the road to Prespes. After the death of their father, the young Anastasios and his brothers were helped to escape to the independent Kingdom of Greece, for the fear of the Bulgarians.

In 1923 he left the army, studied in the National Technical University of Athens and worked as a surveying engineer in various areas of Greece. He was involved in politics and was elected MP of the Kastoria-Florina Prefecture in the elections of 1932, 1935 and 1936.

== Career ==
=== First Balkan War ===
On the outbreak of the First Balkan War in 1912, at the age of 16, presenting false documents due to his young age, he volunteered in the Greek army and participated as a soldier in the Battle of Bizani. In 1917 he graduated from the Greek Army Academy as a second lieutenant. He fought in the Asia Minor Campaign where he was decorated with the Gold Cross of Valour. His younger brother, second lieutenant Athanasios Dalipis, was killed fighting in the Asia Minor Campaign.

=== Greco-Italian War ===
With the outbreak of the Greco-Italian War in 1940 he was recalled to the army and fought in the Albanian front, as a deputy commander and then commander of the 33rd Infantry Regiment. He was wounded in the Boubesi area (Height 717) and was decorated a second time, with the Gold Cross of Valour. Following the German invasion of Greece, Dalipis was evacuated to Crete, where he fought in the Battle of Crete. He was evacuated to Egypt with the last English convoy (29 May 1941), where he joined the Middle East allied forces. There he served as a garrison commander of Alexandria and Tel Aviv. With the liberation of Greece in 1944 he returned to the country and quit the army, having reached the rank of Colonel.

=== Political career ===
In 1946 he was elected for the fourth time deputy of the Kastoria-Florina Prefecture. He served as a Minister Governor-General of Western Macedonia in the cabinets of Konstantinos Tsaldaris and Dimitrios Maximos in 1946–1947, during the difficult years of the Greek Civil War.

He was the first Greek politician who, with an article in the newspaper Ellinikon Aima, accused Josip Broz Tito and Yugoslavia for their direct involvement in the Greek Civil War, with the long-term aim to detach Greek Macedonia. Tito then protested to the UN, and recalled his ambassador in Greece.

Dalipis submitted his resignation aiming to facilitate the Greek government. His resignation was not accepted and following that the Greek government complained to the UN against Yugoslavia.

In 1947, as a Macedonian deputy, he travelled on his own expenses to the United States of America and Canada, where with speeches to the Greek communities he contradicted all the arguments of the Bulgarian and Slavomacedonian propaganda, which at that time was very active in the above-mentioned countries.

As a result of this trip was the unification of all Greek-Macedonian unions under the aegis of the Pan-Macedonian Union.

== Personal life ==
Anastasios Dalipis was married to Dimitra N. Kyrtsou, and had three children, one boy and twin girls.

== Death ==
Anastasios Dalipis died in Athens on July 15, 1949, after a surgery.
