= Pisoderi =

Pisoderi Πισοδέρι
- Community
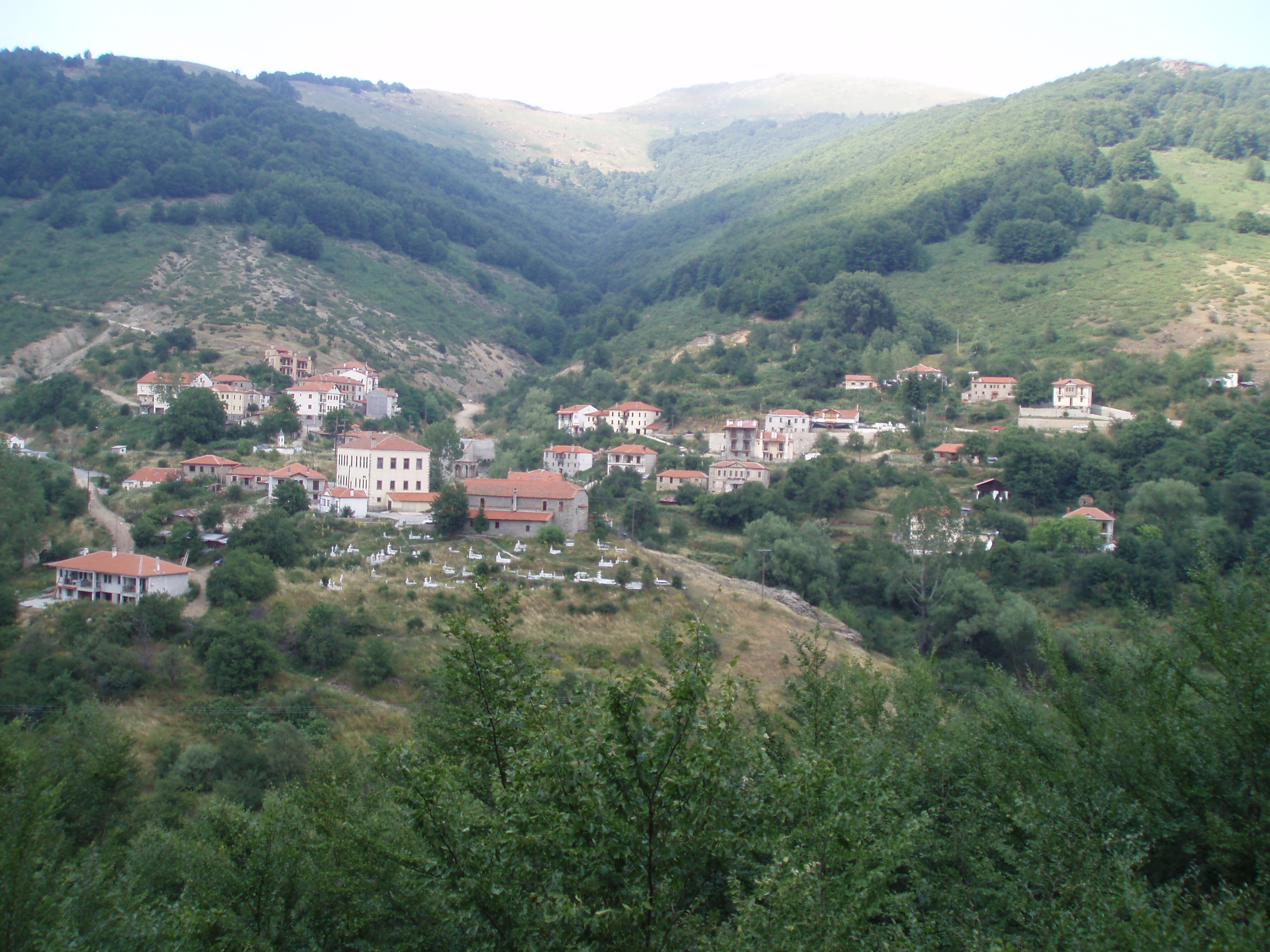

- Location within Greece
- Coordinates: 40°47′10″N 21°14′49″E
- Country: Greece
- Administrative region: Western Macedonia
- Regional unit: Florina
- Municipality: Prespes
- Municipal unit: Prespes

Population (2021)
  - Community: 17
- Time zone: UTC+2 (EET)
  - Summer (DST): UTC+3 (EEST)

Vigla

Pisoderi (Greek: Πισοδέρι; Aromanian: Pisuderea) is a village 17 km west of Florina, Greece. Nearby, 5 km away, is the ski resort Vigla.

The ski center is located on Mount Verno, and currently has five lifts and ten trails. The summit of the resort is 1939m above sea level, with a total vertical drop about 420m. The resort has a view of the Lake Prespa, on the border between Greece, Albania and North Macedonia.

First mentioned in an Ottoman defter of 1481, the village, then known as Ipsoder, had only twelve households. During Ottoman times, the village was purely Aromanian.

Pisoderi had 30 inhabitants in 1981. In fieldwork done by anthropologists in the 1990s, Pisoderi was populated by Aromanians. The Aromanian language was used by people of all ages, both in public and private settings, and as the main language for interpersonal relationships. Some elderly villagers had little knowledge of Greek.

== Notable people ==
- Lazaros Tsamis (1878–1933), merchant and Macedonian Struggle fighter
