= Supreme Committee of Cretan Struggle =

WW2 Greek resistance organization

The Supreme Committee of Cretan Struggle (Greek: Ανωτάτη Επιτροπή Αγώνος Κρήτης, A.E.A.K.) was a resistance organization founded in Crete in June 1941. It was the first armed resistance organization founded in Greece after its occupation by the Axis powers and was a precursor to the National Organization of Crete (EOK).

== Establishment ==
AEAK was founded in Chania on June 15, 1941, just two weeks after the end of the Battle of Crete and the occupation of the island by the Germans. Its founding members were Ioannis Paizis, M.D. from Chania prefecture, Col. Andreas Papadakis (a veteran of the Asia Minor campaign and Plastiras' former aide-de-camp) from the prefecture of Rethymno, lawyers Titos Georgiadis and Ioannis Ioannidis from the prefectures of Heraklion and Lassithi prefecture, and Andreas Polentas as secretary general. The Chairman of the Court of Appeals of Crete, Aristomenis Karakoulakis, joined the steering committee of the organization.

AEAK was Venizelist in ideology. Some of its founding members (e.g. Papadakis, Paizis) had participated to the failed coup d'état attempt against the Metaxas regime in 1938.

== Activity ==
The organization was headquartered at Papadakis' house in Vourvoures, a remote location between the villages of Asi Gonia and Kallikratis. AEAK coordinated the rescue and evacuation of many Allied soldiers who had been stranded in Crete after its occupation. It was also active in gathering military intelligence and sharing it with SOE agents operating in Crete.

The activities of Andreas Polentas were betrayed to the Germans, who arrested and executed him in Agia prison on December 21, 1942.

AEAK was integrated into EOK, which was established in July 1943.
