= Kallikratis =

Village in Sfakia, Crete, Greece

Coordinates: 35°14′32″N 24°15′27″E

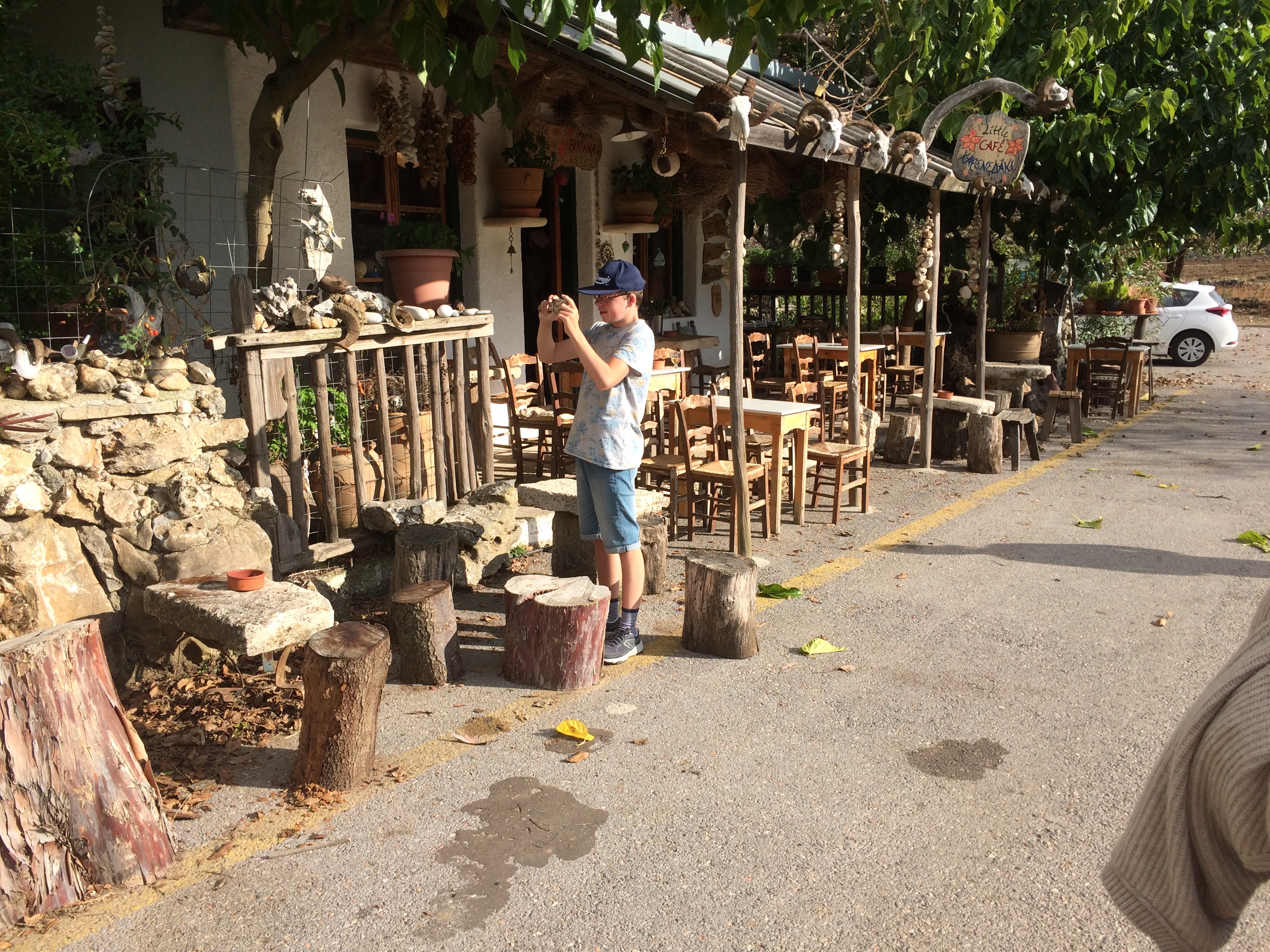
"Little Cafe", Kallikratis, Crete

Kallikratis (Greek: Καλλικράτης) is a small village belonging to the municipality of Sfakia, in southwest Crete, Greece.

According to tradition, it was named after the admiral (droungarios) Manoussos Kallikratis, who in March 1453 led a campaign to reinforce the defense of Constantinople with 5 ships and 1500 Cretan volunteers. As reported by Sphrantzes in his Chronicle, these volunteers manned three towers on the walls of Constantinople and continued to fight bravely even after the city had fallen. In recognition of their gallantry, sultan Mehmed allowed them to safely sail back to Crete, retaining their weapons.

== Geography ==
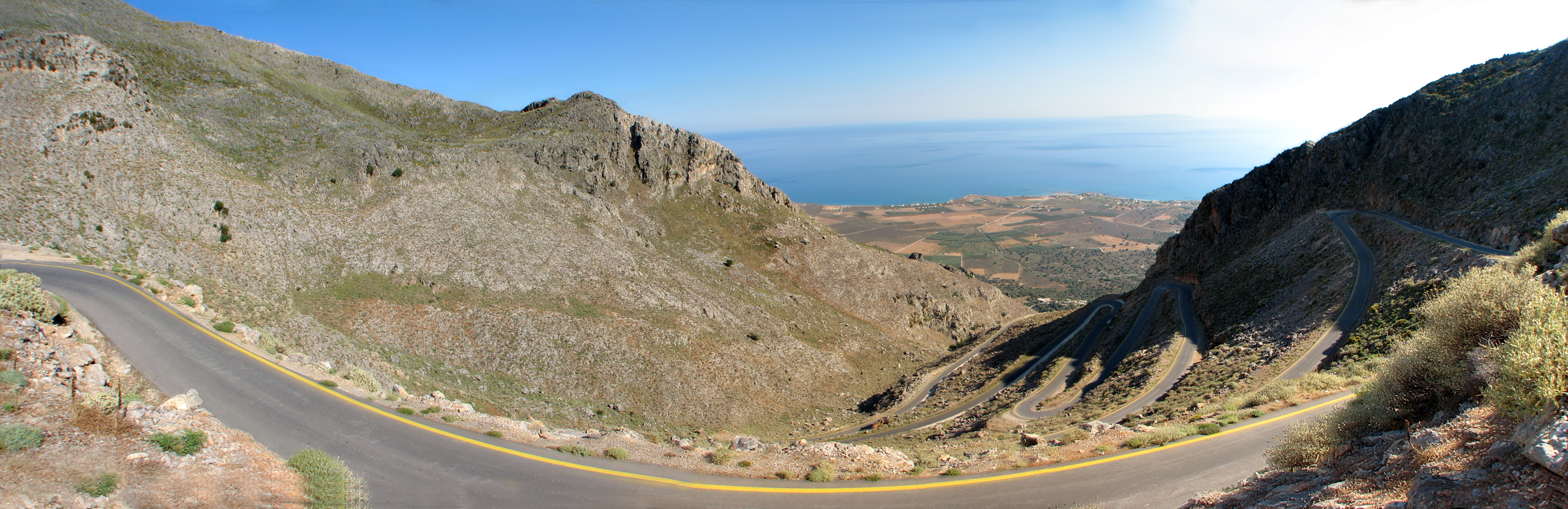
The road from Kapsodasos to Kallikratis.

Kallikratis is situated off the beaten tourist path and is made up of four widely separated neighborhoods that are scattered on a small plateau in Lefka Ori with an average altitude of 540m. It can be reached via Myriokefala, Asi Gonia or Asfendos, or via a recently paved road with more than 25 tight hair-pin turns, which starts in Kapsodasos and overlooks the Frangokastello plain and the South Cretan Sea in the distance. Kallikratis is also on the E4 walking route. Kallikratiano (i.e. Kallikratis') gorge starts southwest of the village and ends in the village of Patsianos, maintaining important natural habitats. The gorge can be crossed on a 4 km path. Before 1900, Kallikratis was a large village with more than 130 families. Today, only a few tens of inhabitants still live in the village and many of the houses are deserted. Kallikratis is almost uninhabited during the colder months of the year, since in that time the local shepherds move with their herds in transhumance to the warmer climate of the villages near the shore.

== History ==
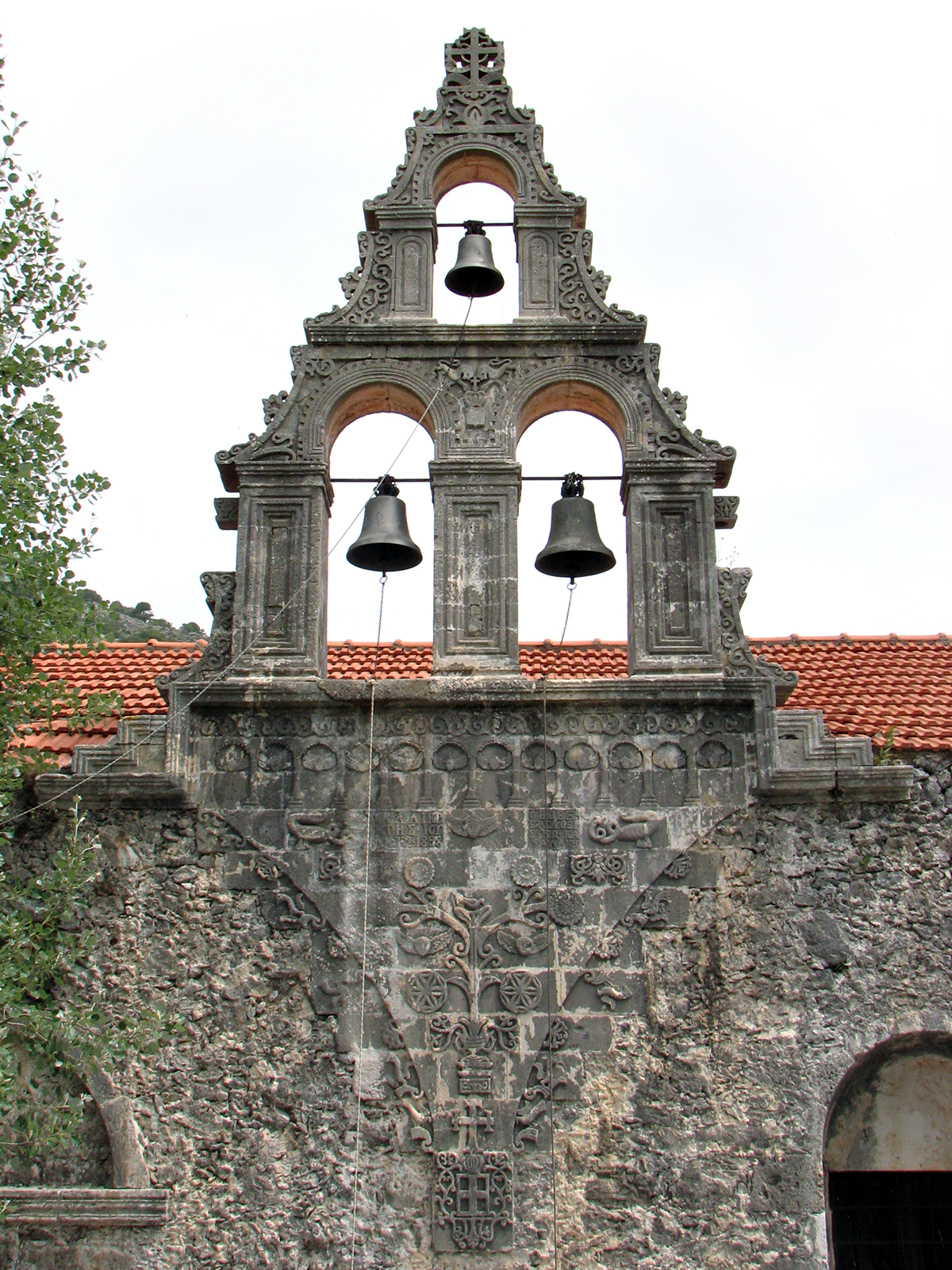
The stonecut bell tower of the double-nave church of Panagia, built ca. 1890.

Kallikratis never lived under permanent foreign rule and its residents have a long tradition of participation in national fights for freedom.

=== Wars against the Ottoman Turks ===
In 1770, Kallikratis was destroyed during Daskalogiannis' revolt against the Ottoman Empire. In 1821, a group of Sfakians led by Kallikratis native Georgios Demonakis (Greek: Γεώργιος Δαιμονάκης) fought with Alexander Ypsilantis after his crossing of the Prut river to start a revolt in Romania. In July 1821, during the revolt of 1821, part of Kallikratis was burnt while many of its residents were away fighting the Turks near Rethymno. In 1866, during the great Cretan revolt, Kallikratis was burnt for the third time. The following year (1867), Ottoman forces under the command of Omar Pasha unsuccessfully attempted to invade Sfakia from Kallikratis.

=== Macedonian struggle ===
At the beginning of the twentieth century, several Kallikratians voluntarily took part in the struggle for Macedonia between 1904 and 1908 under the leadership of Efthimios Kaoudis, Georgios Dikonymos, Emmanouil Benis and Lamprinos Vranas.

=== World War II ===
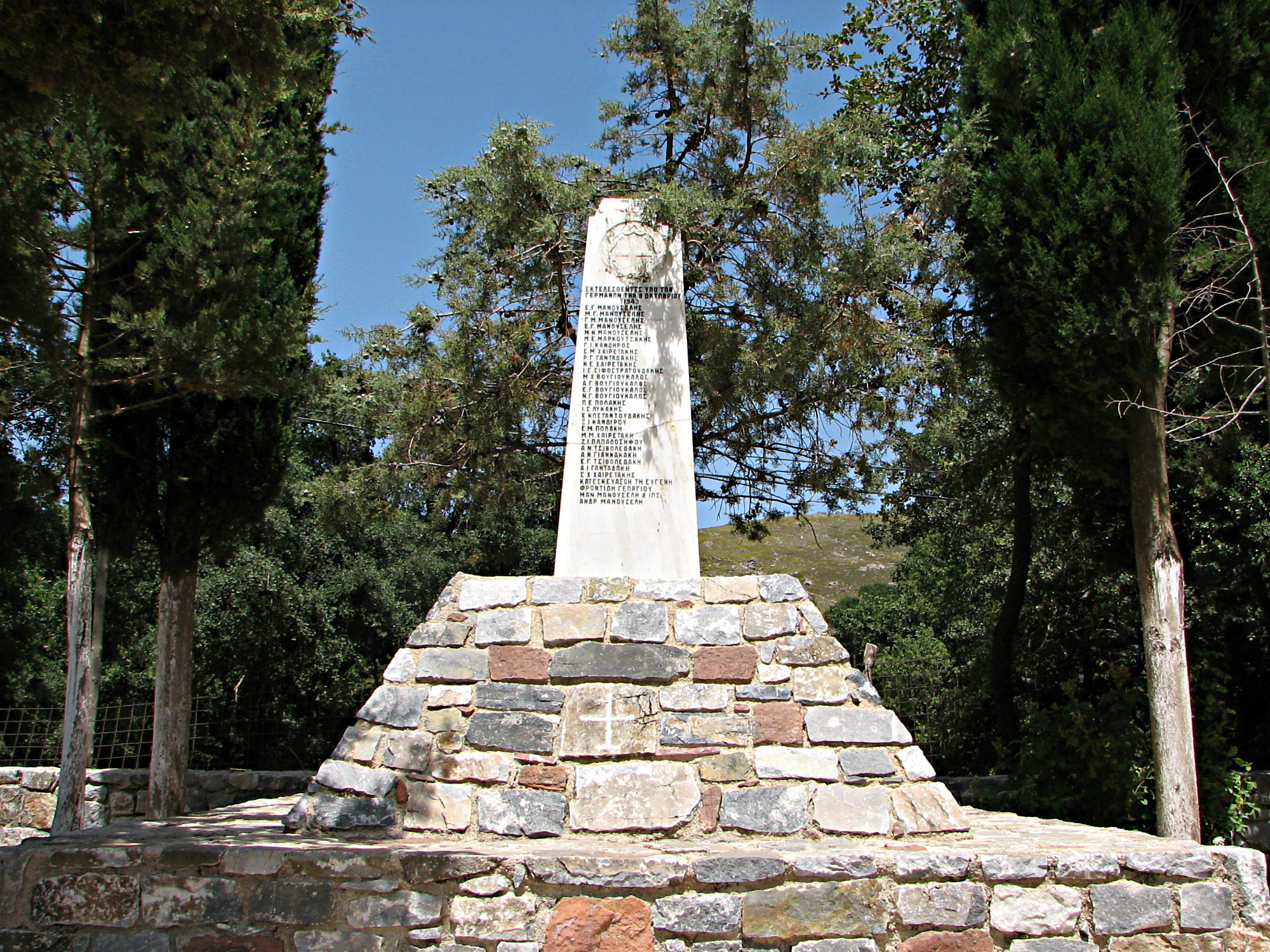
Monument of the 1943 executions.

During the first months of the Axis occupation of Crete, the AEAK resistance organization was established at the house of Colonel Andreas Papadakis, located between Kallikratis and Asi Gonia. Later on, the resistance operated a radio station hidden in a cave near Kallikratis.

In October 1943, in reprisal for aiding the partisans operating in the area, Friedrich Schubert's Jagdkommando accompanied by German occupation forces subjected the village to a collective punishment. Around 30 civilians were executed and another twenty were imprisoned. Houses were looted and burned and the remaining inhabitants expelled.

In memory of these events, Kallikratis was declared a martyred village on 3 October 2018 (Presidential Decree 29, ΦΕΚ Α 54/2.4.2019).

== Miscellaneous ==
The family of Kostas Mountakis, one of the most celebrated Cretan music artists, originated from Kallikratis. On Sep. 5th 2008, a Cretan music night dedicated to his memory was held in Kallikratis.
During summer, a couple of coffee shops and taverns serving local specialties are open in the area.
