= Antartiko =

Antartiko Αντάρτικο, Желево
- Community
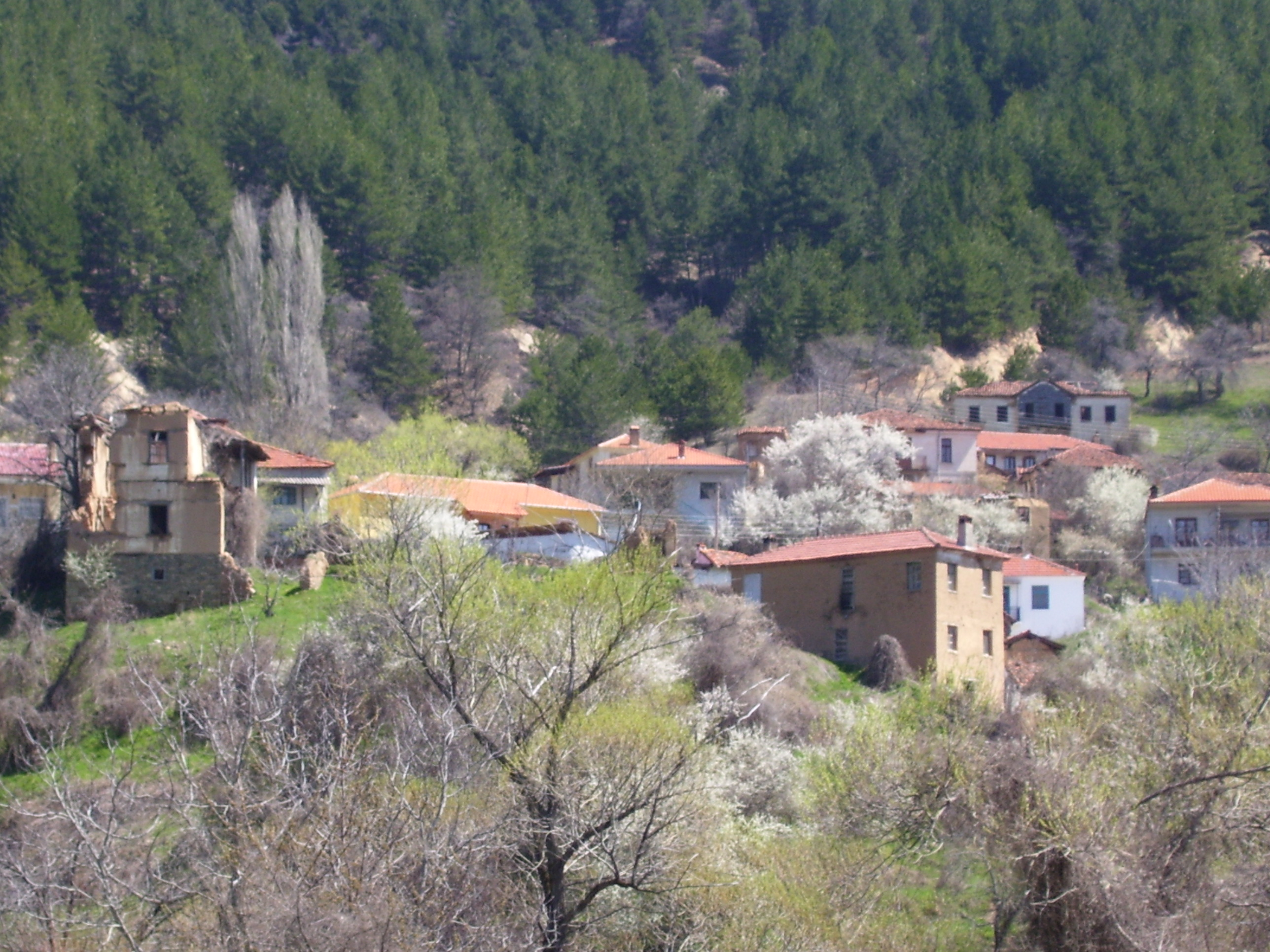
- Antartiko in 2007

- Location within Greece
- Coordinates: 40°45′31″N 21°12′23″E
- Country: Greece
- Administrative region: West Macedonia
- Regional unit: Florina
- Municipality: Prespes
- Municipal unit: Prespes

Population (2021)
  - Community: 69
- Time zone: UTC+2 (EET)
  - Summer (DST): UTC+3 (EEST)

Antartiko (Greek: Ανταρτικό, until 1927 Ζέλοβο – Zelovo; Macedonian/Bulgarian: Желево / Zhelevo), is a village in the Prespes Municipality in Macedonia. Nestled in the mountains to the west of Florina at an altitude of 1047 metres, the village has suffered from a long decline in population and influence.

== History ==
The village is believed to be initially inhabited in the early 19th century by Epirotes and people from Debar. Following the Greek liberation of the village from the Ottomans in 1913, Zhelevo was renamed to Antartiko in the 1920s. On an Austro-Hungarian military survey map from 1900, the name of the village appears as Zelova, or alternatively Zelin. According to the 1913 Greek census, the village had a total population of 1.415 people. The village population dropped from 1345 people in 1940 to 605 people in 1961, 196 people in 1981, and 133 people in 1991. The village had a local newspaper by 1933.

The church St. Nikolay was built in the early 18th century. The second church in the village, St. Atanas, was built under the initiative of the local benefactor and the activist of the Bulgarian Revival Movement Pavle Yankov in 1880s, but the Greek Bishop of Kastoria refused to sanctify it because of Slavic inscriptions. The inscriptions were not removed until 1908.

The first attempt to open a Bulgarian school was made by locals in 1883, but was unsuccessful because of the opposition of the Greek teacher.

The village was a base for the Greek andartes in the struggle with the detachments of IMORO in the beginning of 20th century. Local inhabitants took part in this struggle on both sides led by Pavlo Athanse for the Greek Andartes. The main part of the population of the village came under the supremacy of the Bulgarian Exarchate towards the end of the first decade of 20th century. According to officials of the Exarchate, in 1909 over 200 households were under the spiritual jurisdiction of the Exarchate and 50 under the Patriarchate of Constantinople). Until the summer of 1908 the Exarchate families were served by the Bulgarian priest from the neighboring village of Oshtima (present-day Trigono). Several weeks after the Young Turk Revolution the first Exarchate priest, local resident Ivan Trayanov, started his work in Zhelevo.

Inhabitants of Zelovo who were master builders and carpenters worked seasonally in the surrounding villages, in Bitola district and the wider region of Western Macedonia, Serbia, Turkey, the Greek islands and Athens. Limited arable land and difficult living conditions of the late Ottoman era and early Greek period made some villagers immigrate to Toronto, Canada. The Zelovo immigrants in Toronto participated in the early Bulgarian community to build church infrastructure.

The village was an important staging ground for the French forces, l’Armee d’Orient, during the WWI, and an active combat area, with two French 120 mm artillery pieces stationed at the village. Turkish troops were active in the village on 12 December 1912. It was the furthest west staging area for the French Army, who then advanced to the West of Lake Prespa as part of the Vardar Offensive. The French 175th Combat Infantry passed through the village on 30 August 1917. Russian forces stationed nearby were also evacuated from the village to Koritze by American ambulanciers. It was during this period that the first automobile reached the village, driven by an American ambulancier through the Pisoderi Pass. Due to its strategic importance, French forces improved the infrastructure in the area by laying telegraph lines from Antartiko to Florina, and improving the road from Florina through the Pisoderi pass to better accommodate mechanized vehicles. French soldier Jean Saison described the village in October 1916 as follows: “At Zelova we saw them shuttling between the corn fields and the village from morning and until night, climbing hard trails with a huge bale of straw on their heads. All pack animals and cattle had been removed by the troops. Here, under the eye of a man sitting lazily, cigarette in mouth, young and old fight corn cobs packed with a vengeance. Whether the grains are spread over the area or the ears adorn the windows in tightly packed rows, their bright yellow explodes next to dark red peppers and scarlet aprons, that give, under the sun, a wonderful color tableaux.”

In 1985, "Agios Germanos" a women's cooperative focused on agritourism was founded in the village providing tourists accommodation in traditional houses, meals at its restaurant and environmental and cultural activities to do in and around Antartiko.

== Demographics ==
Antartiko had 169 inhabitants in 1981. In fieldwork done by anthropologist Riki Van Boeschoten in late 1993, Antartiko was populated by Slavophones. The Macedonian language was spoken in the village by people over 30 in public and private settings. Children understood the language, but mostly did not use it.

Many people emigrated to Canada, the United States and Australia. Nowadays, according to the 2021 Greek census, the population of the village is no more than 69. In more recent decades, the area has seen an increase in illegal immigration from Albania, as the border is close by. The main industry of the area for a long time was farming, and a main road only connected the village with Florina in the last 50 years or so.

== Notable people ==
- Traianos Liantzakis (1850s-?), Greek chieftain of the Macedonian Struggle
- Pavlos Kyrou (1860s-1906), Greek chieftain of the Macedonian Struggle

Foto S. Tomev (1899-1986), Emigrant to Canada, author of "A Short History of Zhelevo Village, Macedonia"; Award-winning Canadian fine artist. Foto Spiro Tomev was a talented Toronto-based artist who, after studying with different members of the Group of Seven and graduating from the Ontario College of Art in 1922 started painting and continued to do so up until the early to the mid-1980s. Through those years he produced some fine artistic renditions of Toronto's old city-neighborhood settings and its peoples.
