= Asi Gonia =

Asi Gonia Ασή Γωνιά
- Municipal unit
- Location within the regional unit

- Location within Greece
- Coordinates: 35°16′N 24°17′E
- Country: Greece
- Administrative region: Crete
- Regional unit: Chania
- Municipality: Apokoronas

Area
  - Municipal unit: 18.3 km^{2} (7.1 sq mi)
- Elevation: 400 m (1,300 ft)

Population (2021)
  - Municipal unit: 456
  - Municipal unit density: 24.9/km^{2} (64.5/sq mi)
- Time zone: UTC+2 (EET)
  - Summer (DST): UTC+3 (EEST)

Asi Gonia (Greek: Ασή Γωνιά) is a mountainous village and a former community in the eastern part of the Chania regional unit in Crete, Greece. Since the 2011 local government reform it is part of the municipality Apokoronas, of which it is a municipal unit. The municipal unit has an area of 18.273 km^{2} (7.055 sq mi). Asi Gonia is situated east of the Lefka Ori mountain range, 20 km southwest of Rethymno. The communal office is situated in the heart of the community. In the village square there are two statues dedicated to the two Greek prime ministers Eleftherios Venizelos and Sofoklis Venizelos.

== Historical population ==
Year	Population
1981	508
1991	526
2001	586
2011	527
2021	456

== Famous natives ==
- George Psychoundakis, resistance fighter and author of the Cretan Runner
- Pavlos Gyparis, infantry Colonel of the Greek army
- Andreas Papadakis, infantry Colonel of the Greek army and leader of AEAK
- Stylianos Petrakis, Vice Admiral
- Petromarkos, Cretean Revolutions Chief
