= Ioannis Karavitis =

Ioannis Karavitis Ιωάννης Καραβίτης
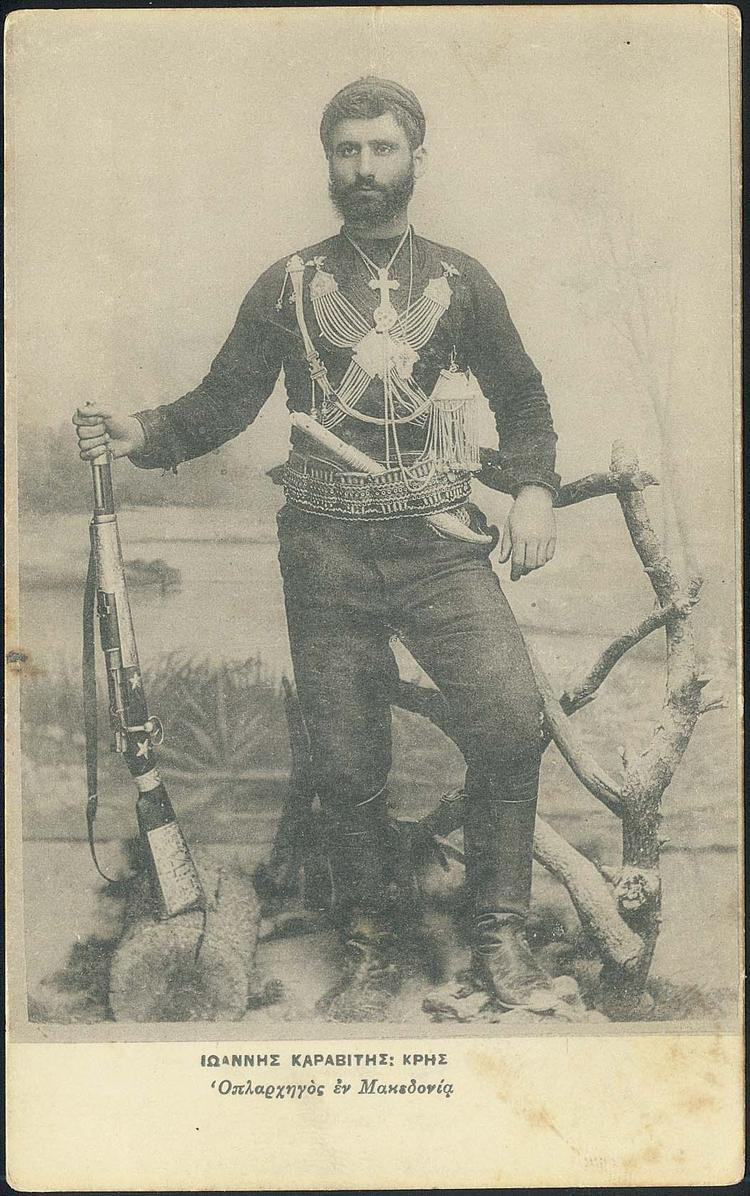
- Ioannis Karavitis during the Macedonian Struggle.
- Native name: Ιωάννης Καραβίτης
- Born: Autumn 1883; Anopolis, Eyalet of Crete, Ottoman Empire (now Greece)
- Died: 30 October 1949 Athens, Kingdom of Greece
- Buried: First Cemetery of Athens
- Allegiance: Kingdom of Greece; Aut. Rep. Northern Epirus
- Branch: Hellenic Army
- Service years: 1904–1914
- Conflicts: Macedonian Struggle; Balkan Wars; First Balkan War; Second Balkan War; North Epirote Struggle

Ioannis Karavitis (Greek: Ιωάννης Καραβίτης 1883–1949) was a Greek leader in the Macedonian Struggle from Crete.

== Biography ==
Karavitis was born in the autumn of 1883 in Anopolis in the area of Sfakia in Crete. In 1903, while he was in Athens, he learned about Cretan forces going to Macedonia to fight and he decided to participate himself. After the Macedonian Struggle, he took part in armed conflicts in Crete and Samos, in the Balkan Wars and in the Epirote Struggle. He strongly disagreed with the outcome of the National Schism and the establishment of different states in Athens and Thessaloniki during the First World War.

Karavitis left Crete in 1929 and moved to Piraeus and later in Athens, where he rented the cafe "Argolis". A few years earlier, the Hellenic Army Academy had established a guerrilla warfare lesson called "Karavitis’ Tactics", which included a surprising approach of the enemy, gathering information, swift attack and retreat.

At the end of 1939 and beginning of 1940, Karavitis published in the "Kritikos Kosmos" (Greek: «Κρητικός Κόσμος») details of his struggles with plenty descriptions of the feats of Cretans. Later, he published what he remembered about the war in the newspaper "Ellinikos Vorras" (Greek: «Ελληνικός Βορράς») in Thessaloniki. The publication was launched on May 22, 1949, and ended on March 25, 1950, with a total of 236 sheets. In his memoirs more information about his participation in the Struggle were provided.

He died on 30 October 1949. The funeral was held at public expense, with the military funeral honours of a general at the First Cemetery of Athens.
