= Efthymios Kaoudis =

Greek revolutionary

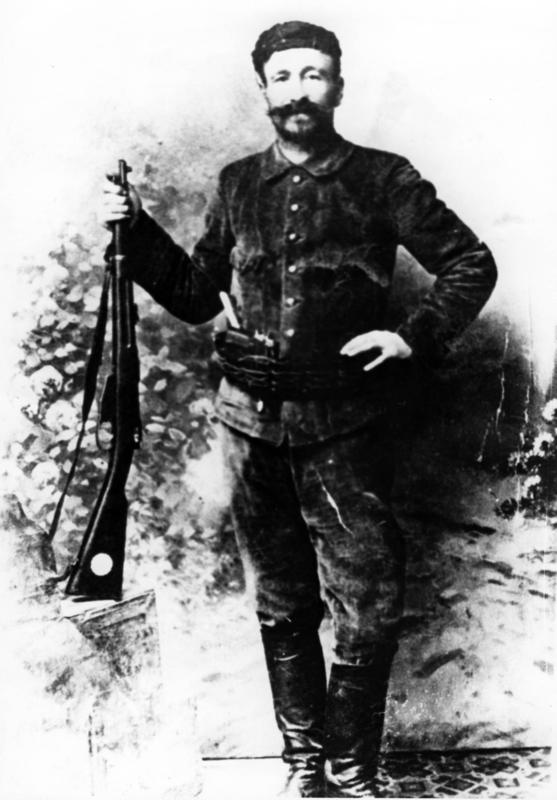
- Efthymios Kaoudis c. 1903–1906
- Native name: Ευθύμιος Καούδης
- Nicknames: Old Kaoudis; Γέρος Καούδης)
- Born: 1866; Kallikratis, Eyalet of Crete, Ottoman Empire (now Greece)
- Died: 17 December 1956 (aged 89–90) Thessaloniki, Kingdom of Greece
- Allegiance: Kingdom of Greece
- Branch: Hellenic Army
- Conflicts: Greco-Turkish War (1897); Cretan Revolt; Macedonian Struggle; Balkan Wars; First Balkan War; Liberation of Samos; World War I; Macedonian front; Greco-Turkish War (1919-1922); Occupation of Constantinople
- Other work: Member of the Pavlos Melas Organization

Efthymios Kaoudis (Greek: Ευθύμιος Καούδης, 1866–1956) was a Greek revolutionary and the leader of the first Cretan armed group in Macedonia, during the Macedonian Struggle.

== Biography ==
Efthymios Kaoudis was born in 1866 in the village Kallikratis in Crete. Before 1903 he left the island because of the assassination of Vouidas, chief of a gang of robbers, for which he was accused. After leaving his village, he moved to Athens where he worked as a builder. By the end of the Balkan Wars, he settled in Thessaloniki where he died on 17 December 1956.

== Military activity ==
Kaoudis was active in Macedonia from 1903 to 1906. During the Macedonian Struggle, they called him the "Old Kaoudis" because of his age and his distinction in the Cretan revolt of 1897. On 6 May 1903, he went to Thessaloniki and in June of the same year he became leader of a team of ten men. Then, he went to the Florina–Kastoria region where he remained for about two months, working against the Bulgarian VMRO's bands. In August 1903 he moved with his team to Volos and a year later he returned to Athens.

In 1904 the newly established Macedonian Committee in Athens made him a proposal which he accepted and he went to Macedonia for the fourth time. On September 18, 1904, he managed with his team the first major damage against the Bulgarians in the battle of Trigono (then Ostima). After the Pavlos Melas’ death (13 October 1904) Kaoudis temporarily assumed command of the forces in Western Macedonia. On November 14 of the same year, in collaboration with Katechakis’ group, he attempted attack against a Bulgarian wedding in Sklithro. The winter of 1904-1905 he acted in villages of the Korestia while on 25 March 1905 he participated in the attack against Vasileiada, which was organized by Georgios Tsontos.

In late August he acted again in the area of Korestia. Then, in late October, Kaoudis collided with Tsontos and continued his action in the villages of Peristeri. He stayed at Peristeri until the Easter of 1906, except from March that he went for a short time in Korestia. On 23 April 1906 the group of Kaoudis clashed with the Ottoman army in Kratero.

During the First Balkan War, Efthymios Kaoudis took part in the operations for the liberation of Samos, and after that was accomplished moved to Macedonia. On 11 October he entered Siatista and the next day he clashed with the Turkish army and moved to the city of Grevena.

In 1916 he joined the Provisional Government of National Defence, and during the Allied Occupation of Constantinople in 1919 he served in the Vlachopoulos battalion, garrisoned in the Dolmabahçe Palace, and served as military commander in Fener. During the government of Eleftherios Venizelos he was awarded the rank of captain.

From 1927 onwards, he was an active member of the "Pavlos Melas" organization, which brought together many fighters of the Macedonian Struggle. During the Axis occupation of Greece, he left with his stepdaughter for Piraeus and then he went to Crete to avoid reprisals from the Bulgarians.

After the occupation, he returned to Thessaloniki where he remained until his death on 17 December 1956. His funeral was held at public expense, with the III Army Corps rendering honours corresponding to a general in active service.

== Bibliography ==
- Chotzidis, A., (ed.), 1996. «Ευθύμιος Καούδης. Ένας Κρητικός αγωνίζεται για τη Μακεδονία. Απομνημονεύματα (1903-1907)», Museum of Macedonian Struggle, Thessaloniki.
- Dakin, D., Mazarakis – Ainian, K. I., Kofos, E., Diamantouros, N. I., 1985. «Μακεδονικός Αγώνας», Εκδοτική Αθηνών, Athens.
- Gounaris, B., (ed.), 1992. «Φθινόπωρο του 1904 στη Μακεδονία. Το ανέκδοτο ημερολόγιο του Μακεδονομάχου Ευθύμιου Καούδη», Museum of Macedonian Struggle, Thessaloniki.
