= Christos Xenitopoulos =

Greek footballer

Personal information
- Full name: Christos Xenitopoulos
- Date of birth: 1 June 1990 (age 36)
- Place of birth: Serres, Greece
- Position: Left back

Team information
- Current team: Ethnikos Piraeus F.C.

Youth career
- PAO Rouf

Senior career*
Years	Team	Apps	(Gls)
2010	PAO Rouf	9	(0)
2010	→ Saronikos Aegina (loan)	0	(0)
2012–	Ethnikos Piraeus	31	(6)
- * Club domestic league appearances and goals

Christos Xenitopoulos (Greek: Χρήστος Ξενιτόπουλος; born 1 June 1990) is a Greek footballer, who currently plays for Ethnikos Piraeus in the Football League 2 as a left back.
