= Serres Racing Circuit =

Motor racing circuit in Serres, Greece

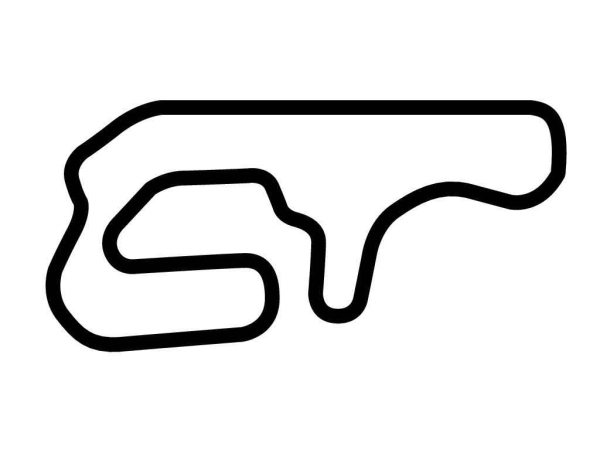
- Location: Serres, Greece
- Coordinates: 41°04′20″N 23°30′59″E
- Capacity: 10,000
- Owner: Municipality of Serres (76.5%)
- Operator: Serres Circuit S.A
- Broke ground: 1995
- Opened: May 1998; 28 years ago
- Website: https://serrescircuit.com

Full Circuit (1998–present)
- Length: 3.186 km (1.980 mi)
- Turns: 16

Serres Racing Circuit (Greek: Αυτοκινητοδρόμιο Σερρών, Aftokinitodromio Serron) is a motor racing circuit in the City of Serres in Greece. The operator is "Serres Circuit S.A". The main shareholder is the Municipality of Serres owning the 76.5% of the shares.

== History ==
It was built by the Municipality of Serres and started its operations in May 1998. Resurfacing works took place in 2012. Then, the circuit was resurfaced again in 2021.

== Specifications ==
The length of the racing circuit is 3.186 km (1.980 mi) and the width varies from 12 to 15 m (13 to 16 yd). This makes it the largest in Greece. It has 16 turns, 7 to the left and 9 to the right. It is the only racing circuit in Greece that meets the construction specifications of the International Automobile Federation - FIA and of the International Motorcycling Federation - FIM. It also meets the safety requirements for races of up to Formula 3 level.

== Facilities ==
There is a media center that can accommodate up to 50 people, three (3) VIP rooms with a view of the pits, five (5) soundproofed rooms to allow live broadcasting, an award-ceremony room, and two (2) cafe-restaurants offering breakfast, all day meals, coffee, and beverages

In March 2019 the circuit hosted a round of the BMU European Road Racing Championship, whose F110 race was won by Slobodan Ivceski ahead of Dencho Karaivanov and the Turkish rider Suat Kosif.
