= Sarakatsani Folklore Museum =

Museum in Serres, Greece

View from outside

The Sarakatsani Folklore Museum (Greek: Λαογραφικό Μουσείο Σαρακατσάνων) is a museum dedicated to the history and traditions of the Sarakatsani group native to northern Greek Macedonia. The museum was established in Serres, Central Macedonia, Greece in 1979. The present structure dates to 1997 and was purpose-built to house it.

On the ground floor are reconstructions of the tsiatoura, the temporary shelter the Sarakatsani use when they are on the move, and the woven huts in which they live, make cheese, and teach their children. All the huts relate to the final phase of the Sarakatsanis nomadic life, during the interwar period.

On the first floor are tools and weaving equipment for the entire process from spinning the thread to the final products, which include bedspreads, flokati rugs, and other textiles. There are also showcases displaying the varieties of Sarakatsani costume for both women and men.

Since 1998, the museum has been running a two-hour educational program for children of primary school age. Specialists introduce the children to the Sarakatsan way of life, teaching them how to weave, how to spin, and how to live in a Sarakatsan hut. The museum also has a collection of old photographs from all over Greece covering the period 1906–50, a collection of traditional songs, recorded and archived in categories, and a room equipped with audio-visual systems.

== Gallery ==
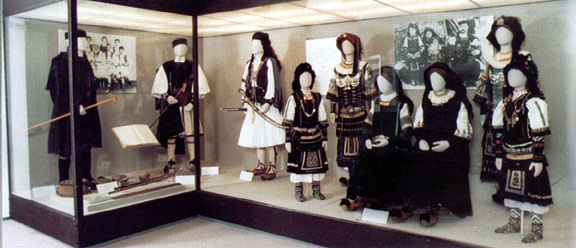
Sarakatsan costumes

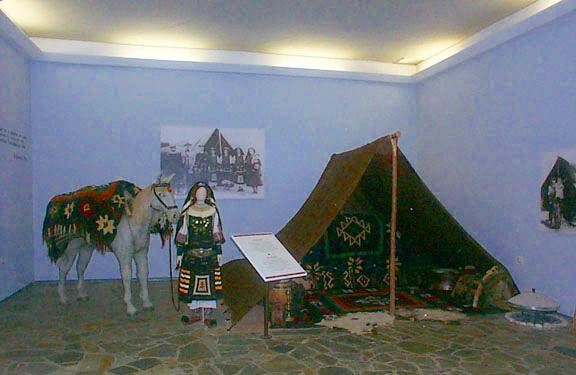
The tsiatoura, the temporary shelter the Sarakatsani

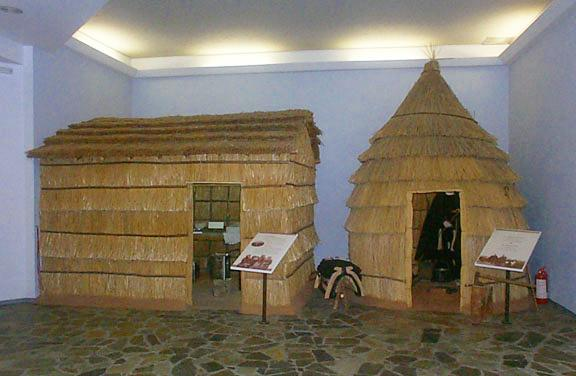
The woven huts in which they live and make cheese
