= Saints Theodore Tyro and Theodore Stratelates Church =

Greek Orthodox church, former cathedral, in Serres, Central Macedonia, Greece

- Saints Theodoroi
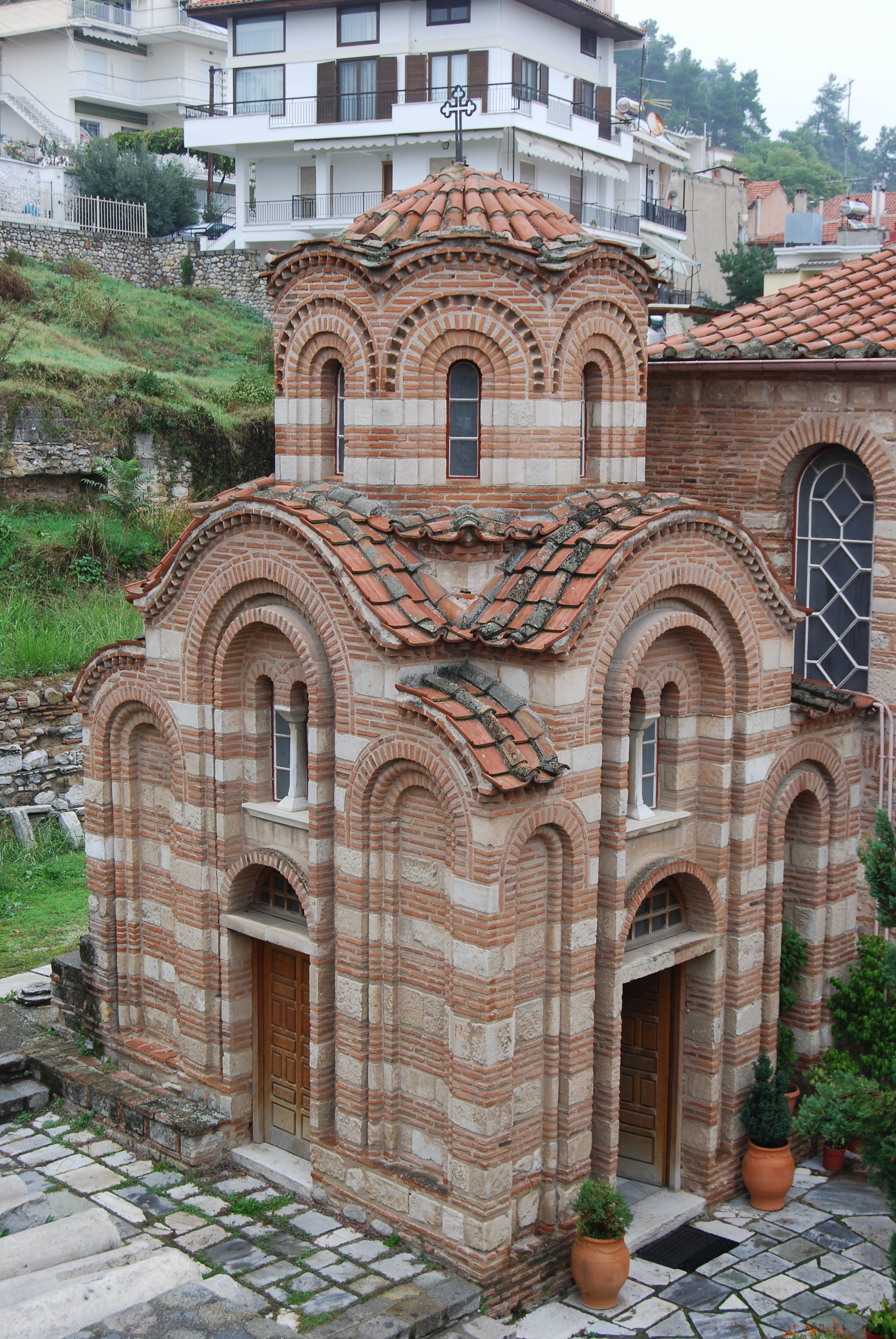
- Entrance to the church

- Location of the church in Greece
- Saints Theodore Tyro and Theodore Stratelates Church
- 41°05′40″N 23°33′15″E
- Location: Serres, Central Macedonia
- Country: Greece
- Denomination: Greek Orthodox

History
- Status: Cathedral (former); Church
- Dedication: Saint Theodore Tyro; Saint Theodore Stratelates

Architecture
- Functional status: Active
- Architectural type: Basilica
- Style: Byzantine
- Completed: 1124 (first structure); c. 1221 (rebuild); 1959 (rebuild)
- Demolished: 1205 (Fourth Crusade); 1913 (Balkan Wars)

Specifications
- Length: 24 m (79 ft)
- Width: 15.6 m (51 ft)

Administration
- Province: Ecumenical Patriarchate of Constantinople
- Metropolis: Serres and Nigriti

Saints Theodore Tyro and Theodore Stratelates Church, or commonly known Saints Theodoroi (Greek: Άγιοι Θεόδωροι) is a Greek Orthodox church and former cathedral in the city of Serres, in the Central Macedonia region of northern Greece.

Built as a cathedral in 1124, during the Byzantine era, the church is dedicated to Theodore of Amasea (Tyro) and Theodore Stratelates. Subject to destruction in 1205 during the Fourth Crusade, the cathedral-church was rebuilt in 1221; and again destroyed in 1913 during the Balkan Wars, and subsequently restored between 1938 and 1959.

== Gallery ==
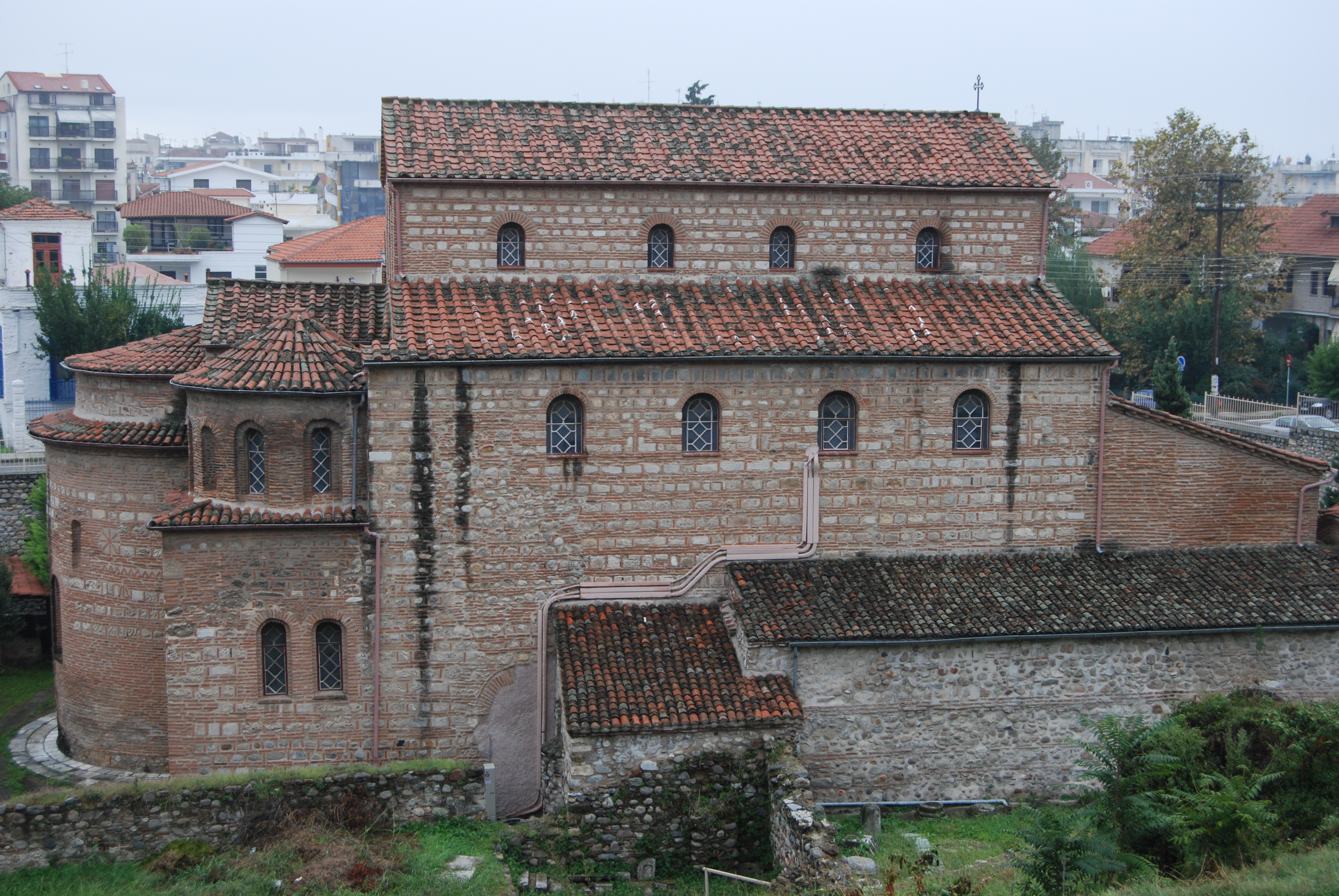
View

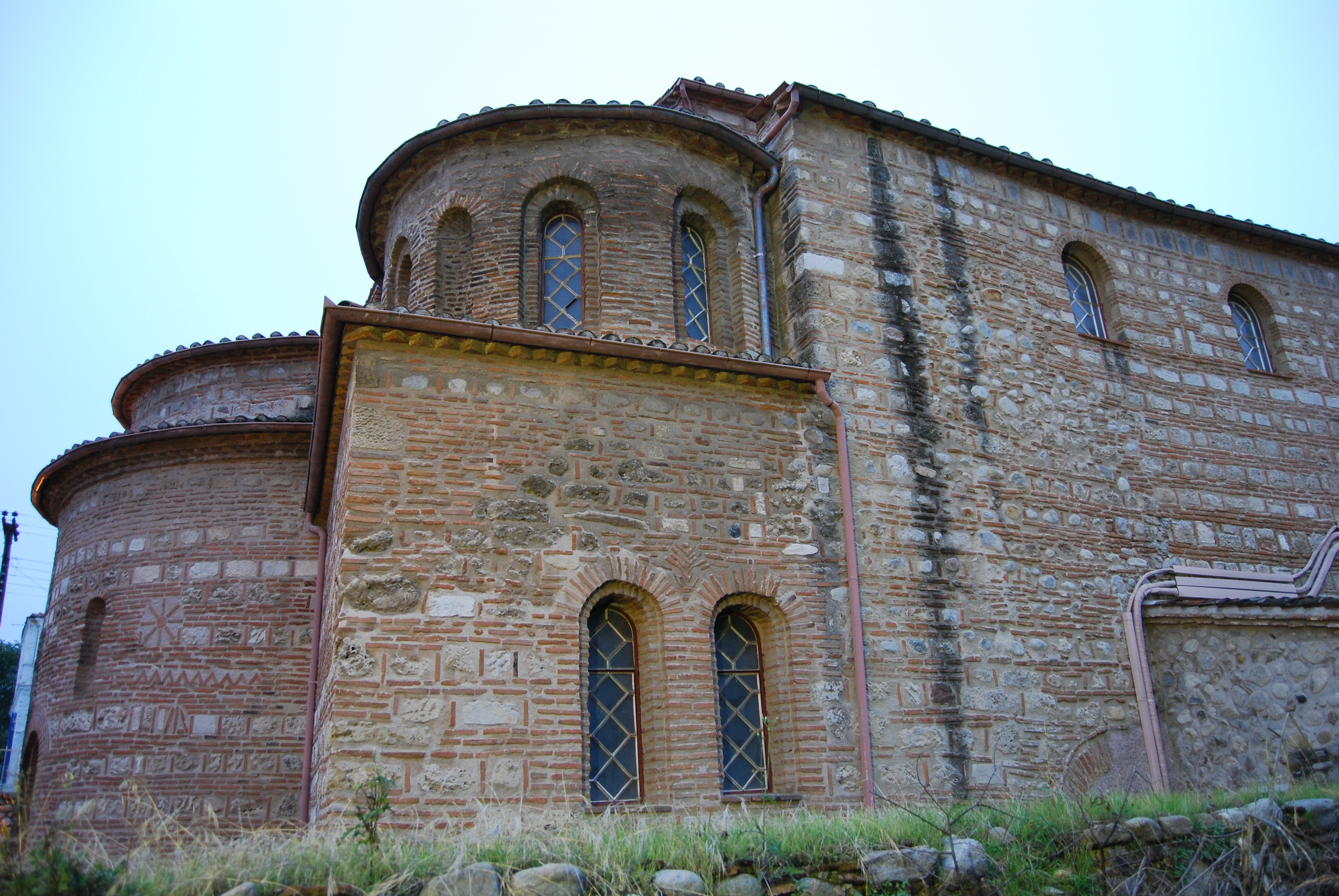
Another view

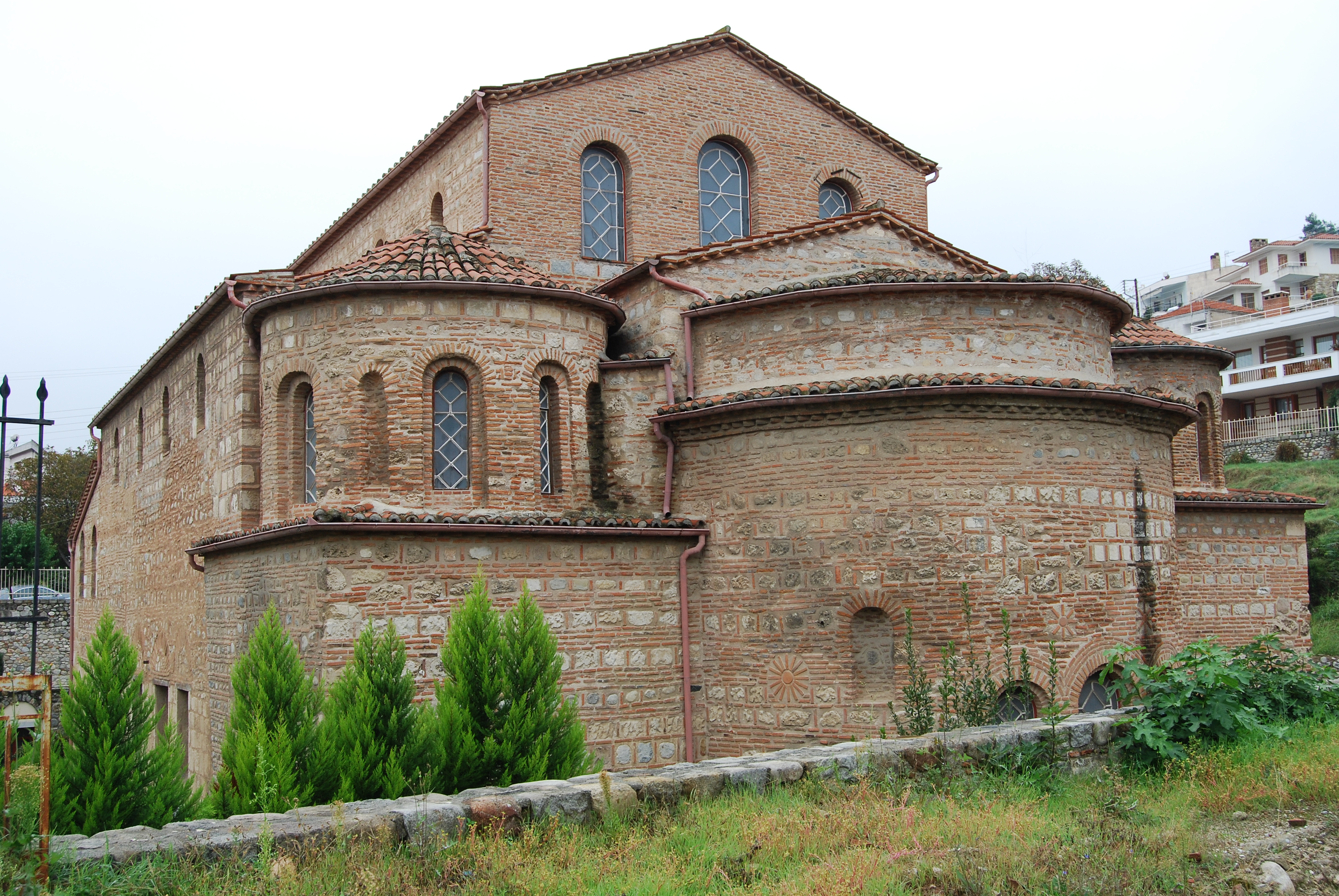
Rear view

== See also ==
- Church of Greece
- List of Eastern Orthodox church buildings in Greece
