= Suat Kosif =

Turkish motorcycle and jet ski racer

- Kosif at the Serres circuit in 2019
- Nationality: Turkish
- Born: 15 May 1990 (age 36); Rize, Turkey
- Current team: Smyrna
- Bike number: 16

Suat Kosif (born 15 May 1990) is a Turkish motorcycle racer who competes in circuit racing, mainly in the F110 class, and also races jet skis. He races with the number 16 for the Smyrna club and is a licensed athlete of the Turkish Motorcycle Federation (TMF).

== Career ==
Kosif began riding at a young age and raced at the İzmir Ülkü circuit before moving to circuits abroad. In 2015 he entered his first international race, at the Serres Racing Circuit in Greece, and took a trophy in the 1000 A class. In later years he raced at Serres, at the Bucharest Ring in Romania, and at events in Slovakia and Croatia.

In October 2022 the Turkish press reported that he was preparing for races in the Czech Republic and Italy, and that he had received an offer to join a Yamaha team in Belgium.

At the European championship of the Balkan Motorcycle Union (BMU) at Serres in March 2019 he qualified second in the F110 class with a lap of 1:31.082 and finished third in the race, three tenths behind the second-placed rider. In the same series at Serres he finished third in the F110 class in the first race and seventh in the second. The championship is organised by the Balkan Motorcycle Union. His name is also listed by the TMF among the athletes representing Turkey abroad.

Kosif continued racing at Serres in 2026, including track days in September and October.

== Jet ski ==
Kosif also competes in jet ski racing, where he races with the number 222. In the 2026 Turkish Water Jet Championship he finished second in the first Spark race at İznik in August and won the second race at Bodrum in September. At the Marmaris final in October he finished second in the first race, won the second race and placed first in the Spark classification. For the following season he is set to race a Sea-Doo RXP-X 350.
