= Katakonozi =

Greek neighborhood

Katakonozi (Greek: Κατακονόζι) is a neighborhood in Serres, Greece.

According to local legend, the Byzantine family of 'Kantakouzinos' once possessed the land that now belongs to the neighborhood.

At the end of the 20th century, it was established as a location for the housing of immigrants from former Soviet bloc countries, and has more recently become a hotspot for real estate development projects. As a result, the neighborhood has undergone unprecedented expansion. The neighborhood was the site of a pilot project in Serres to improve mixed waste collection among the densely populated area with many detached houses that had made effective collection difficult in previous years.
