= Christos Aritzis =

Greek footballer (born 1984)

Personal information
- Full name: Christos Aritzis
- Date of birth: 11 August 1984 (age 42)
- Place of birth: Serres, Greece
- Height: 1.84 m (6 ft 0 in)
- Position: Forward

Senior career*
| Years | Team | Apps | (Gls) |
| 2004–2007 | Doxa Drama | | |
| 2007 | Asteras Tripolis | | |
| 2008 | Kalamata | | |
| 2008 | Vihren Sandanski | 10 | (0) |
| 2010– | Panafpliakos-Iraklis | | |
- * Club domestic league appearances and goals as of 31 December 2008

Christos Aritzis, (Greek: Χρήστος Αριτζής; born 11 August 1984) is a Greek footballer currently playing for Bulgarian side Vihren Sandanski. He is a central forward.

Aritzis previously played for Kalamata F.C. in the Greek Beta Ethniki.
Currently Aritzis is playing for Panaupliakos. in Nafplio in the Greek Delta Ethniki.
