= Sterikas Koulis =

Greek painter

Sterikas Koulis (Greek: Στερίκας Κούλης, 1922-1995) was a Greek painter. He was one of the most active painters in Florina, northwestern Greece, and one of the co-founders of The Shelter of Art Lovers and the Florina Museum of Modern Art.

Sterikas born in Korçë, southern Albania. He moved to Florina, northwestern Greece at an early age. Sterikas became a self-taught painter and didn't receive any academic education. In the 1950s he established his own workshop in Florina.

He became one of the leading figures in the cultural life of Florina In 1974 Sterikas founded the Shelter of Art-lovers (Greek: Στέγη Φίλων της Τέχνης) and became its president for several years. The Shelter of Art-lovers still remains the most active organization in cultural life of Florina, responsible for the function of several local institutions, such as the Florina Museum of Modern Art and the Florina Art Gallery.

Sterikas work was influenced by the Impressionism and later on he turned to Fauvism. Latter in the 1980s his artwork often focuses on social sensitive issues and especially in peace movements. His workshop in Florina works now as a museum.
