= Petros Hatzitasis =

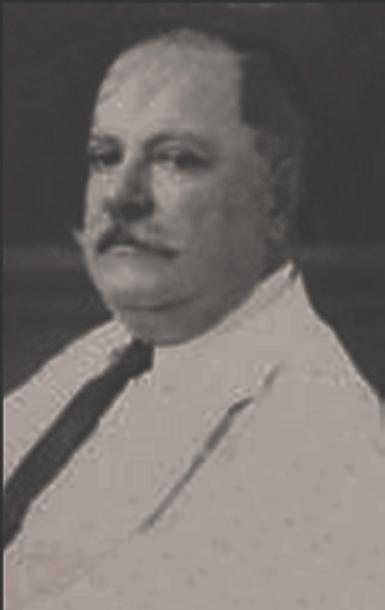
- A photo of Petros Hatzitasis.
- Native name: Πέτρος Χατζητάσης
- Born: c. 1872; Florina, Monastir Vilayet, Ottoman Empire (now Greece)
- Died: c. 1932
- Allegiance: Kingdom of Greece
- Service / branch: HMC
- Battles / wars: Macedonian Struggle: Battle of Drosopigi (POW)

Petros Hatzitasis (1872-1932) was a Greek chieftain from Florina who contributed to the Macedonian Struggle.

He was born in 1872 in Florina and was an important member of the five-member National Committee of Florina founded in 1902 by Nikolaos Pyrzas.

He tried to assassinate the Bulgarian komitadji Michael Grezhov in 1904, but the latter escaped, although wounded. He cooperated with the army of Pavlos Melas and participated in the clash which cost Melas his life, in Statista. He and his team cooperated with Nikostratos Kalomenopoulos for many operations. He participated in the battle of Drosopigi near Florina, where he became a prisoner of the Ottoman authorities and was imprisoned for three years, until 1908.
