= Florina Museum of Modern Art =

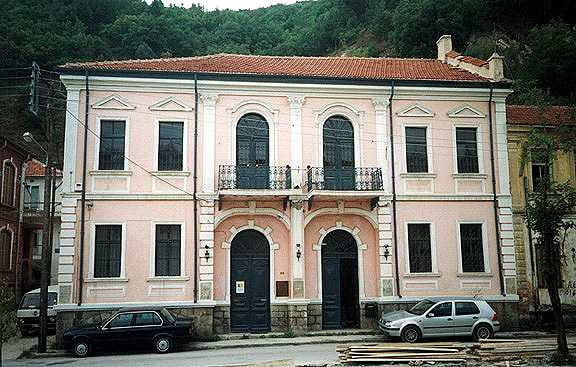
- Established: 1977
- Location: Florina, West Macedonia, Greece
- Coordinates: 40°46′39″N 21°24′16″E
- Type: Art museum

The Florina Museum of Modern Art is an art museum in Florina in Greece. It was founded by the Florina Art Centre in 1977. It is housed in a neoclassical building by the Sakouleva river. The museum's collection is composed of 480 works by 254 artists, which includes paintings, sculptures and engravings. More recently, its collection was enriched by a work of El Greco donated by the national Gallery, as well as by 44 engravings from Florence. These are in display since August 1999. Apart from its permanent exhibition, the museum also organizes art symposia and exhibitions of visual and applied art.

The purpose of the museum is to promote modern Greek culture through products of contemporary art, to cultivate the aesthetic and critical faculties of the local people by mounting solo and group exhibitions of visual art, and to provide schoolchildren with artistic education.

The museum's collection consists of representative paintings, sculptures, and engravings by noted artists of the twentieth century. More specifically, it includes: paintings by Rengos, Plakotaris, Mavridis (painter), Kaniaris, Tetsis, Kokkinidis, Mytaras, Kondos, Kanakakis, Kondogiannis, Tsaras, Xanthopoulos, Botsoglou, Dimitreas, Sahinis, Fokas, Golfinos, Lachas, Kalamaras, Papagiannis, Georgiadis, Zongolopoulos, Perandinos, Koulandianos, Lappas; sculptures by Chalepas; engravings by Hadzikyriakos-Gikas, Rengos, Papageorgiou, Grammatikopoulos, Papadakis, Xenakis, Nikolaou, Sikeliotis, Tsoklis, Moralis, Giannadakis, Nedelkos and Justin Falzon. A recent addition to the exhibits is a collection entitled ‘Tribute to El Greco’, which was put together from donations from Greek artists to acquire El Greco's ‘St Peter’ from the National Gallery and 44 engravings by 31 foreign artists from Florence. The collection was displayed in the museum in August, 1999.

The museum has a library dedicated to the visual arts, an information archive and an atelier for young people. It frequently organises art symposia and exhibitions of visual and applied art both on its own premises and elsewhere in Greece.

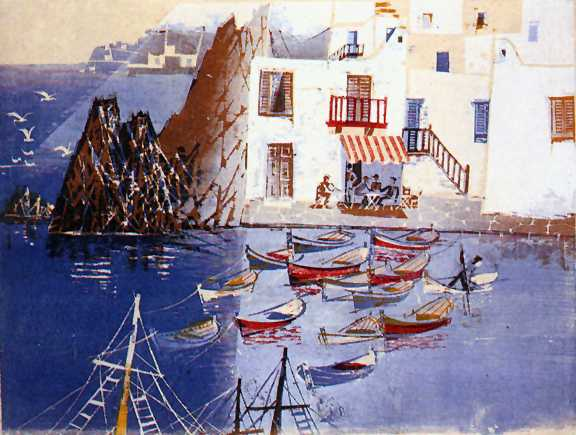
Grammatikopoulos, Aegean see

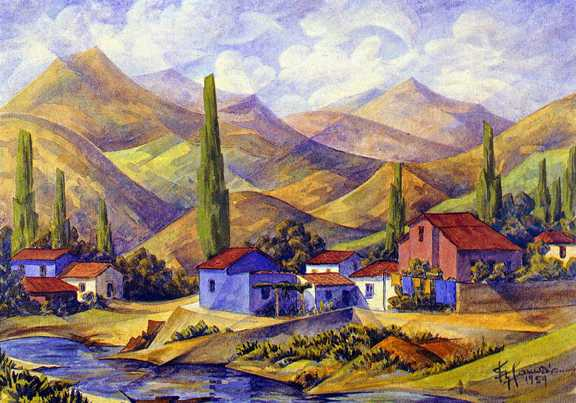
Plakotaris, Florinas landscape

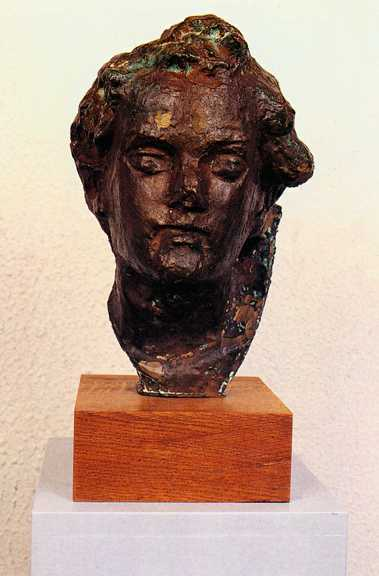
Sculpture by Halepas
