= Battle of Florina (1949) =

Battle of the Greek Civil War (1949)

Coordinates: 40°46′58″N 21°24′32″E

- Part of Greek Civil War
Date	12–15 February 1949
Location	Florina, Macedonia, Greece
Result	National Army victory

Belligerents
(Greece) Provisional Democratic Government: Democratic Army of Greece	Kingdom of Greece: National Army

Commanders and leaders
(Greece) Nikos Zachariadis (Greece) Georgios Gousias	(Greece) Nikolas Papadopoulos

Strength
4,000	?

Casualties and losses
799 killed 1,500 wounded 350 captured/surrendered	44 killed 220 wounded 35 missing in action
- Location of the battle in Greece

The Battle of Florina (Greek: Μάχη της Φλώρινας, Macedonian: Битката за Лерин) took place in early February 1949. It was fought during the Greek Civil War, pitting forces of the communist Democratic Army of Greece (DAG) led by Nikos Zachariadis against the National Greek Army, led in Florina by General Nikolas Papadopoulos. The battle ended in defeat for the communists.

== Background ==
Toward the late 1940s, the last stages of the Greek Civil War were fought between the communist DAG and the Greek Government. Military setbacks made DAG retreat from southern Greece and promises of an autonomous Macedonia replenished their numbers with Slavophone Macedonians from northern Greece, forming almost half its fighting force in 1949. Nikos Zachariades took direct control of the war effort in January 1949 and removed Markos Vafiades as DAG Commander–in–Chief and replaced him with Georgios Gousias, an experienced commander focusing on tactical warfare. Zachariades planned to take Florina, later Thessaloniki and the rest of the Greek north.

== Battle ==
Zachariades sought to show his military skills with a decision to attack Florina. In Albania, DAG had a base and on 15 January they marched toward Florina and arrived in the area through the Pisoderi Gorge. On 12 February 1949, the tenth and eleventh divisions of DAG led by Gousias and numbering 4,000 advanced toward Florina early in the morning. The battle began at 3:30am and 1,500 shells were fired by DAG upon government troops defending Florina. The tenth division took the surrounding hills and severed access into the town providing support to the main attack. One brigade of the eleventh DAG division undertook the main attack and entered the southern section of Florina at sunrise and another brigade took the nearby mountainous terrain and severed road access.

Winter slowed military reinforcements, though the government division under General Nicholas Papadopoulos in Florina was armed and had provisions. Government ground troops had air support and the Greek Air Force attacked DAG forces using napalm, rockets and bombs. The offensive was halted at 7:00pm and as government troops fought on, many DAG guerillas died and others withdrew with large losses. After several days the attacks by DAG decreased, additional government troops arrived and expelled DAG forces from Florina and the nearby mountainous terrain. By 15 February, armed DAG formations disintegrated and fled toward the Pisoderi Gorge, leaving many of their weapons and supplies.

DAG losses were 799 killed, 1,500 wounded, 350 of its guerillas captured or surrendered and 400 had frostbite, while Greek National Army losses were 44 killed, 220 wounded and 35 soldiers missing in action. Some 750–850 dead and many wounded DAG guerillas were buried in a pit with bulldozers in a south-eastern location of Florina, close to St. George Church. Nearby, fallen government troops from the battle were buried in separate graves in a military cemetery.

== Aftermath ==
The battle of Florina was the last attempt by DAG to capture a large defended urban centre. Zachariades blamed the defeat on incompetent DAG leadership and guidance, poor command and communications, failures of tactics and warfare by guerillas at the battle. Unlike Vafiades, historians of the civil war consider Zachariades an incompetent commander. For DAG, the battle marked the start of exile of many guerillas to nearby communist states and persecution in Greece of the remaining political left.

Factors contributing to victory by the Greek army were good defensive planning, trained soldiers, adherence to the command structure, high morale, the gathering of reliable intelligence and air power. The result of the battle gave the Greek army the upper hand toward DAG, a position held throughout the remaining months of the civil war resulting in eventual total victory. The outcome of the battle and civil war was viewed in Greece as having preserved the northern sovereign borders of the state. Between 1950 and 1981, February 12 was an annual holiday in Florina commemorating the victory with a town festival, military parade, and a religious procession toward the military graveyard with patriotic speeches given by local elites at the site.

Among locals, the burial site of DAG fighters was known, even in the 1990s, and not openly discussed due to concerns over being labelled unpatriotic, while memories of the battle remained in the 2010s. In the early 1990s, the local Rainbow Party unsuccessfully attempted to buy the site to build a monument, as it considered most of the buried fighters to be Macedonians. Commemorative ceremonies at the site on the battle anniversary date were held by the Greek Communist Party (KKE) in the late 1990s and 2000s.

The mass grave has not been exhumed. Two attempts by the KKE in the mid-2000s to erect a memorial to communist fighters were vandalised and destroyed by unidentified individuals. In 2009 the KKE bought the site and erected a memorial in 2016 encompassing several sculpted individuals on the field commemorating the fighters. The KKE used its internal wartime military archive to identify the DAG fighters and inscribe the monument with their names, with only a few being locals. Slavophone activists of the Rainbow Party said the ethnic wartime aspect such as the Macedonian identity of many fighters was excluded, as their name list of the dead differed from the KKE. The area around St.George Church is the site for commemorations of the battle by Greek communists and nationalists, held on different dates. In the Republic of Macedonia, the battle of Florina was portrayed in the play Lerin – fields of grain, hills of blood in 2016.
