= Archaeological Museum of Florina =

Museum in Florina, Greece

Coordinates: 40°46′51″N 21°24′50″E

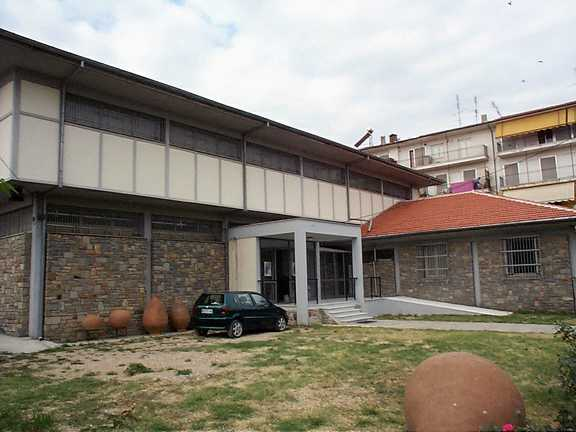
Outside view

The Archaeological Museum of Florina is a museum in Florina in West Macedonia, Greece.

The museum is housed in a two-storey building that was constructed in 1969 and renovated internally in 1999. It has prehistoric, Hellenistic, Roman, and Byzantine finds from the Florina area.

The display on the ground floor was organized in 1998 and inaugurated in May 1999 and contains three basic units. The first of these, to the left of the entrance, provides visitors with information about the geomorphology and history of the Florina region from the period of the earliest archaeological finds (about 5800 BC) to the end of the Roman period. However, the main subject of this unit is the activities of humans within the prehistoric period, presented through finds from the excavation of the prehistoric settlement at Armenchori. In the two adjoining rooms are displayed representative examples of sculpture, mainly Roman and include relief grave and votive stelae with various subjects (horsemen, portraits, a funeral banquet, and deified mortals). Other sculptures and inscriptions (all in Greek) provide evidence for the names of persons, cities, religious beliefs, social conditions and political circumstances. There is a fourth room that houses a conserved mosaic from the remains of a Roman building at Kato Kleines.

More specifically, there are ceramic wares, objects for everyday use, materials for building houses, stone and bone tools, spindle whorls, and figurines.

One impressive exhibit consists in the jaws of a 200,000 - 500,000 year old mammoth, which was found in the village of Sotiras. Also on the ground floor are grave stelae of the Roman period from Vevi (2nd–3rd century AD), Petres (2nd century BC), Sitaria (3rd century AD), Vythkouki, Kastoria regional unit (320BC); statues from Vevi (a male torso of the Roman period) and Lakia (a statue of Artemis of the Roman period); and an exceptional mosaic floor from a house of the Roman period at Kato Kleines.

On the first floor are displayed finds of the Hellenistic period from Petres and Agios Pandeleimon Hill, most notably a sundial, a statue of Artemis, agricultural implements, and a reconstruction of a house of the Hellenistic period with its masonry, fireplace, storerooms, and other features.

There are also exhibits of the Byzantine and post-Byzantine period from the Lake Prespa area, chiefly the basilica of Agios Achilleios (capitals, chancel screen closure panels, chancel screen colonnettes), frescoes from various churches, parts of a wood-carved chancel screen from the hermitage of the Transfiguration (Metamorfosi), and an Vema door from the Church of Agios Athanasios in the community of Agios Germanos (16th century).

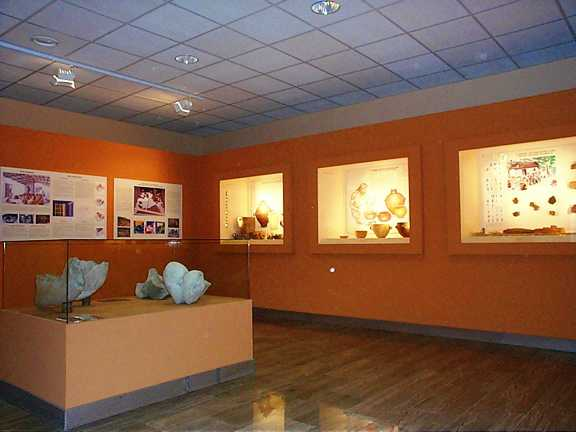
Prehistoric finds, chiefly from the excavations at Armenochori

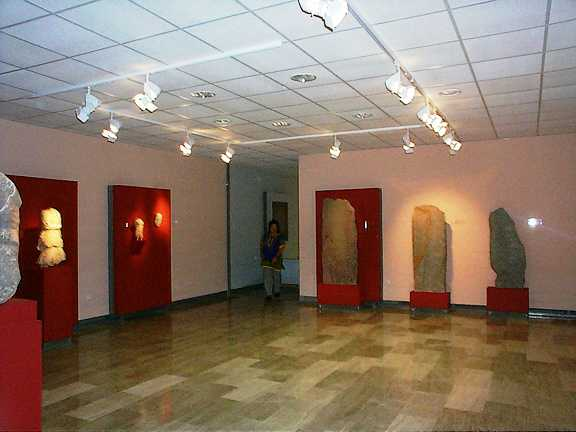
Exhibits of the Roman period

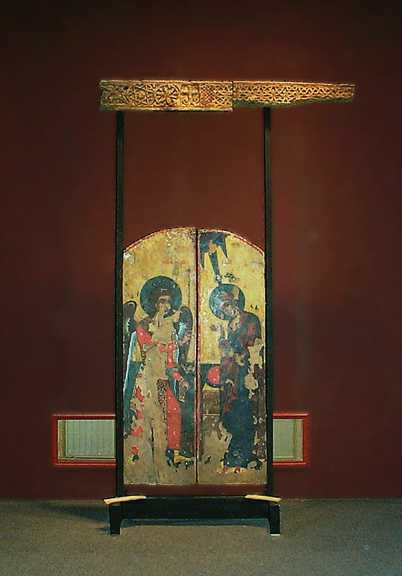
Vema door from the Church of Agios Athanasios in the community of Agios Germanos (16th century).

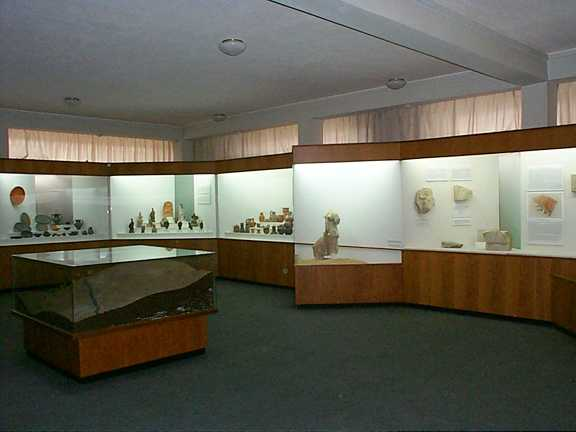
Finds of the Hellenistic period from Petres and Agios Pandeleimon Hill

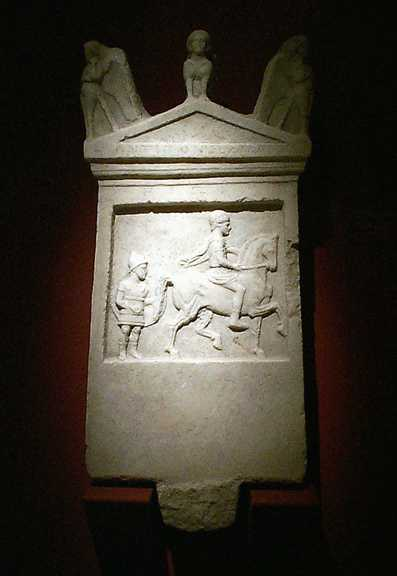
Grave stele of the Roman period from Petres (2nd century BC)

== Sources ==
- This article incorporates text from the corresponding article at the Museums of Macedonia website, commissioned by the Macedonian Heritage foundation, written by Vlasis Vlasidis, and published under a CC-BY-SA-3.0 license.
