= Florina =

Town in Western Macedonia, Greece

Florina Φλώρινα
- Municipality
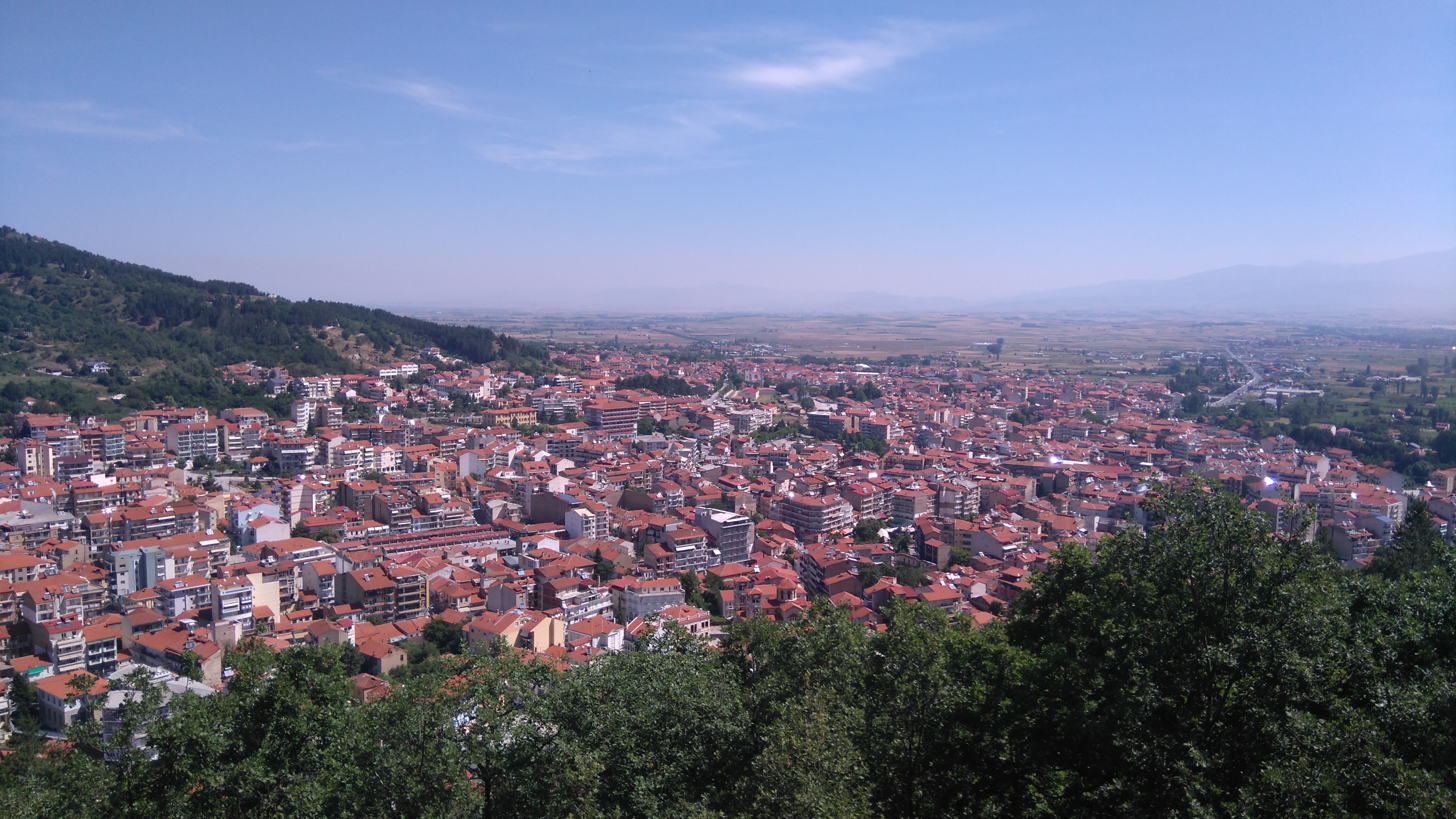
- View of the city of Florina towards the NE

- Seal

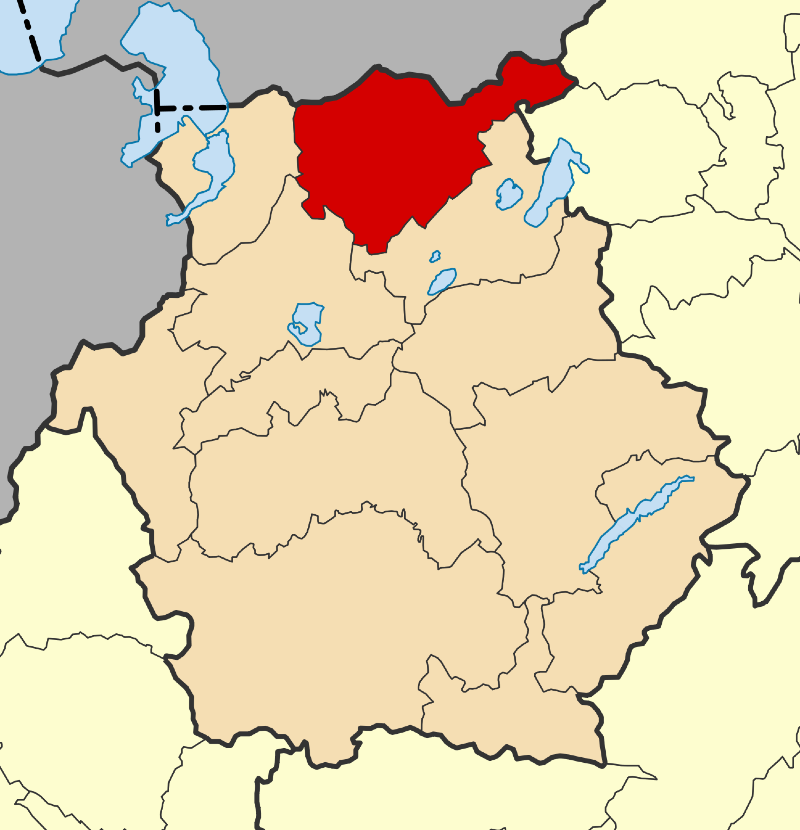

- Location within Greece
- Coordinates: 40°47′N 21°24′E
- Country: Greece
- Administrative region: Western Macedonia
- Regional unit: Florina

Government
  - Mayor: Vasileios Giannakis (since 2019)

Area
  - Municipality: 819.7 km^{2} (316.5 sq mi)
  - Municipal unit: 150.6 km^{2} (58.1 sq mi)
- Elevation: 687 m (2,254 ft)

Population (2021)
  - Municipality: 29,500
  - Density: 36.0/km^{2} (93.2/sq mi)
  - Municipal unit: 19,198
  - Municipal unit density: 127.5/km^{2} (330.2/sq mi)
  - Community: 17,188
- Time zone: UTC+2 (EET)
  - Summer (DST): UTC+3 (EEST)
- Postal code: 531 00
- Area code: 23850
- Vehicle registration: ΡΑ*
- Website: http://www.cityoflorina.gr

Florina (Greek: Φλώρινα, Flórina; known also by some alternative names) is a town and municipality in Western Macedonia, Greece. It is the capital of the Florina regional unit and also the seat of the eponymous municipality. The town's population is 17,188 people (2021 census). It is in a wooded valley about 13 km (8 mi) south of the international border of Greece with North Macedonia.

== Geography ==
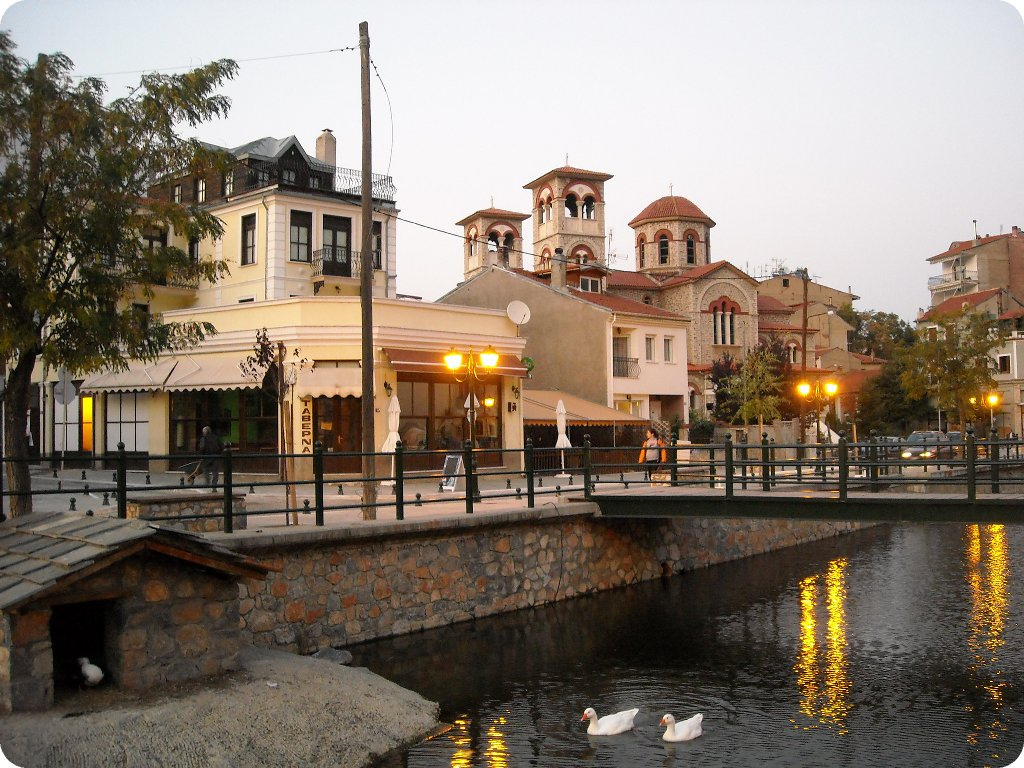
Sakoulevas river and the Cathedral of Florina

Florina is the gateway to the Prespa Lakes and, until the modernisation of the road system, of the old town of Kastoria. It is located west of Edessa, northwest of Kozani, and northeast of Ioannina and Kastoria cities. Outside the Greek borders it is in proximity to Korçë in Albania and Bitola in North Macedonia. The nearest airports are situated to the east and the south (in Kozani). The mountains of Verno lie to the southwest and Varnous to the northwest.

Winters bring heavy snow and long periods of temperature below freezing point. Furthermore, the town and the surrounding valley is usually covered in thick fog during the winter months that may last even for weeks under specific conditions. During the summer months it becomes a busy market town with an economy boosted by summer and, mostly, winter tourism due to the heavy snowfalls and the nearby ski resorts.

Even though Florina was the site of the first rail line built in the southern Ottoman provinces in the late 19th century, its rail system remains undeveloped. Today, Florina is linked by a single track standard gauge line to Thessaloniki and Bitola, and to Kozani (meter gauge) where it was intended to continue south and link up with the terminal in Kalambaka, in Thessaly but this did not proceed due to the 1930s financial crisis of the Great Depression.

The main roads passing through the municipality include: the A27 motorway, which opened in 2015; and the EO2, EO3 and Ptolemaida–Florina national roads. The historic Via Egnatia is situated to the east.

=== Climate ===
Florina is one of the coldest towns in Greece, because of its elevation and geographic position. Snowfalls, sometimes heavy, thick fog and below-freezing temperatures are common during the winter months, while the summers are warm to hot. Under the Köppen climate classification, Florina has a humid subtropical climate (Cfa), bordering on a humid continental climate (Dfa).

==== Cold wave of 2012 ====
In the days preceding the early 2012 European cold wave, more specifically on 18 January 2012, a temperature of -25.1 °C was recorded by the HNMS's station with several reports, however, in the local press for temperatures in villages of the municipality that reached -32 °C, but there was no official record of such temperature. The National Observatory of Athens' station reported a temperature of -22.2 °C a day earlier in Florina, while the same station continuously recorded minimum temperatures below -20 °C from 16 January 2012 until 19 January 2012, with the average maximum temperature for January just -0.6 °C, and the prevalence for 13 consecutive days of temperatures below 0 °C 24 hours a day. The above situation resulted in the Greek General Secretariat of Civil Protection to declare the municipality of Florina in a state of emergency on 16 January 2012, at the request of the mayor of Florina, due to the low temperatures and the intense snowfall that prevailed for days.

Climate data for Florina (1961–2010)
Month	Jan	Feb	Mar	Apr	May	Jun	Jul	Aug	Sep	Oct	Nov	Dec	Year
Record high °C (°F)	18.7 (65.7)	23.0 (73.4)	28.7 (83.7)	31.2 (88.2)	33.8 (92.8)	39.0 (102.2)	40.8 (105.4)	38.6 (101.5)	36.0 (96.8)	32.2 (90.0)	26.6 (79.9)	22.3 (72.1)	40.8 (105.4)
Mean daily maximum °C (°F)	4.7 (40.5)	7.4 (45.3)	12.0 (53.6)	16.8 (62.2)	22.0 (71.6)	26.4 (79.5)	29.0 (84.2)	29.0 (84.2)	24.7 (76.5)	19.0 (66.2)	12.2 (54.0)	5.9 (42.6)	17.4 (63.4)
Daily mean °C (°F)	0.6 (33.1)	2.8 (37.0)	7.0 (44.6)	11.7 (53.1)	16.9 (62.4)	21.1 (70.0)	23.4 (74.1)	22.8 (73.0)	18.2 (64.8)	12.9 (55.2)	7.2 (45.0)	2.0 (35.6)	12.2 (54.0)
Mean daily minimum °C (°F)	−3.1 (26.4)	−1.7 (28.9)	1.5 (34.7)	5.4 (41.7)	9.5 (49.1)	12.8 (55.0)	14.8 (58.6)	14.7 (58.5)	11.4 (52.5)	7.1 (44.8)	2.6 (36.7)	−1.8 (28.8)	6.1 (43.0)
Record low °C (°F)	−25.1 (−13.2)	−23.0 (−9.4)	−13.6 (7.5)	−5.0 (23.0)	−1.8 (28.8)	2.4 (36.3)	6.6 (43.9)	4.0 (39.2)	−1.4 (29.5)	−5.0 (23.0)	−12.6 (9.3)	−18.6 (−1.5)	−25.1 (−13.2)
Average precipitation mm (inches)	56.8 (2.24)	51.1 (2.01)	57.8 (2.28)	60.4 (2.38)	59.4 (2.34)	37.3 (1.47)	33.9 (1.33)	30.6 (1.20)	50.1 (1.97)	69.2 (2.72)	71.3 (2.81)	85.6 (3.37)	663.5 (26.12)
Average precipitation days	11.0	10.6	11.1	10.6	10.7	7.2	5.5	5.3	6.5	7.6	9.7	11.8	107.6
Average snowy days	7.5	6.3	4.5	0.8	0.0	0.0	0.0	0.0	0.0	0.3	1.8	5.9	27.1
Average relative humidity (%)	81.2	76.4	68.8	63.2	62.8	58.6	55.4	56.9	63.3	71.4	77.8	81.7	68.1
Source: Hellenic National Meteorological Service

== Name ==
In the Byzantine period the town was named Chlorion or Chlerino. The first reference to the town as Chlerino is by historian John Kantakouzenos writing in the 14th century. The city's Byzantine name, Χλέρινον (Chlérinon, "full of green vegetation"), derives from the Greek word χλωρός (chlōrós, "fresh" or "green vegetation"). The name was sometimes Latinized as Florinon (from the Latin flora, "vegetation") in the later Byzantine period, and in early Ottoman documents the forms Chlerina and Florina are both used, with the latter becoming standard after the 17th century. The form with [f] (φλωρός) is a local dialect form of χλωρός in Greek. The local Slavic name for the city is Lerin (Лерин), which is a borrowing of the Byzantine Greek name, but with the loss of the initial [x] characteristic of the local dialect.

Alternative origins have been given of the form Florina. The Etymological Dictionary of Modern Greek Oikonyms derives the term Florina from the Albanian word Vlorine, a place resembling the formation of a valley referring to a type of depression located between hills. Simantiras derives Florina from Florin, later becoming Floris, meaning the city built on a hill. The town is known as Lerin (Cyrillic: Лерин) in Bulgarian and Macedonian, Hlernu or Hleru in Aromanian, Filorina in Turkish and Follorinë in Albanian.

The motto of Florina is 'Where Greece begins'.

== Municipality ==
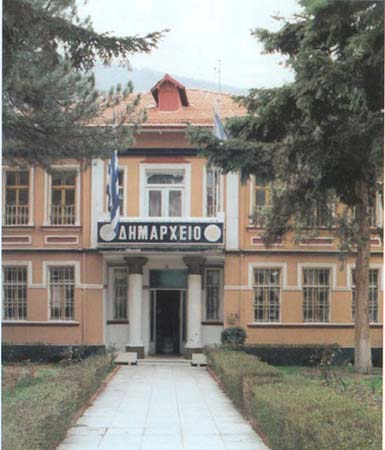
The town hall

The current municipality of Florina was formed at the 2011 local government reform by the merger of the following 4 former municipalities, that since 2011 became municipal units:

- Florina
- Kato Kleines
- Meliti
- Perasma

The municipality has an area of 819.698 km^{2}, and the municipal unit 150.634 km^{2}.

=== Municipal Unit subdivisions ===
The municipal unit of Florina is further divided into the following communities:

- Alona
- Armenochori
- Florina
- Koryfi
- Mesonisi
- Proti
- Skopia
- Trivouno

== History ==
Lynkestis of Upper Macedonia was situated east of lake Pespa. According to N. G. L. Hammond, Lyncestae in the region of Florina were an Epirotic tribe and talked the Northwest Greek dialect. The ancient settlement of Melitonus was located in the area of Florina.

Within the boundaries of the present-day city lie the remains of a Hellenistic era settlement on the hill of Agios Panteleimon. Archaeologists excavated on the site in 1930–1934, but a hotel was later built over the ruins. Excavations began again in the 1980s and the total excavated area is now around 8,000 metres square. The buildings uncovered are mostly residential blocks, and the range of finds suggests that the site was continuously inhabited from the 4th century BC until its destruction by fire in the 1st century BC. Many of these finds are now on display in the Archaeological Museum of Florina.

The town with its present name is linked to the Byzantine Chloron. It is first mentioned in 1334, when the Serbian king Stefan Dušan established a certain Sphrantzes Palaeologus as commander of the fortress of Chlerenon. By 1385, Florina had fallen to the Ottomans. In the early period of Ottoman rule, Florina was a Christian town with a partially fortified Ottoman garrison. An Ottoman defter (cadastral tax census) for the year 1481 records a settlement of 243 households.

The Muslim community existed for five centuries in Florina and they constructed various public and religious buildings. Ottoman traveller Evliya Çelebi passed through Florina in the seventeenth century. He wrote Florina consisted of six neighbourhoods and had 1500 homes, one tekke, several mosques, madrasas and mektebs, two bathhouses and two inns. At the time, some of these buildings were newly constructed or churches which had been converted. Under Ottoman rule, Florina was a regional economic and administrative centre, the seat of a kaza and belonged to a sanjak within the Vilayet of Monastir. Several attacks by Bulgarians and Muslim Albanians occurred between the 17th and 18th centuries. In 1823 the Ottomans destroyed the anchorages of churches and Muslim Albanians pillaged Florina, due to the Greek War of Independence.

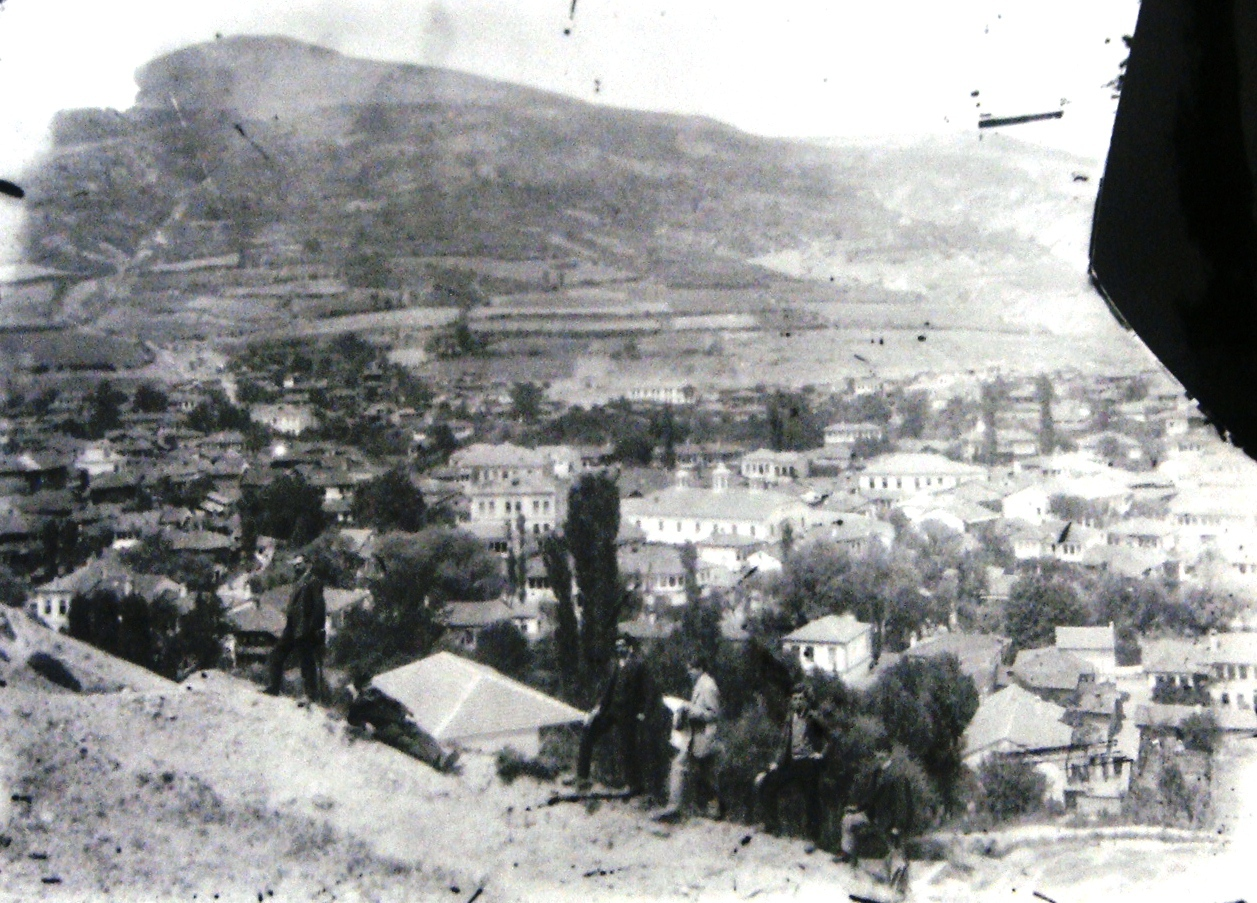
Panorama of the city of Florina, 1898–1912. Photo taken by Manakis brothers (broken glass plate)

Florina in the late Ottoman period was composed of several neighbourhoods with most inhabited by a particular ethno–religious group and a few being mixed. Names of neighbourhoods varied, some based on occupations, ethnic or religious communities such as Armenian, Arnaut, the Dervish lodge, territorial markers or individual names and others. The river and its neighbourhood Varosi formed the centre of Florina and was exclusively populated by Muslims, later from the 1840s onward Christian families also lived there. In the 1850s, new churches were constructed. A church on the outskirts of Florina was used by the Greeks. The town's Bulgarian community joined the Bulgarian Exarchate and built a church in 1889 to perform their liturgy after gaining approval from Ottoman authorities and overcoming objections from Muslims, who were supported by Greeks in Florina.

Several inhabitants from Florina participated in the Macedonian Struggle on the Greek side and included prominent leaders such as Nikolaos Pyrzas, and Petros Chatzitasis. In the late Ottoman period the area surrounding Florina supported the Internal Macedonian Revolutionary Organization (IMRO) who fought against the Ottomans. During the Macedonian Struggle the Greek makedonomachoi gained significant advantage towards the Bulgarian Exarchists within 10 months in 1905 and extended their zone of control in various regions of western Macedonia including the plains north and south of Florina.

In the early 20th century, Florina underwent several years of Ottoman modernisation. The Ottomans built some European style administrative buildings. The Balkan Wars (1912–1913) brought an end to Ottoman rule when Florina and the surrounding area was taken by Greece during November 1912. Annexed by Greece, Florina became part of the Greek province of Macedonia. The new Greek municipal authority began plans for modern urban redevelopment. In 1913 electrification was introduced to Florina and a new slaughterhouse was built. During 1914, Primeminister Eleftherios Venizelos visited Florina and Alfredo Leguillon, a French engineer made a new street plan to redevelop the town resulting in the disruptive relocation of town inhabitants. The Muslim mufti was exiled by Venizelists in 1914 and Christian inhabitants in the town lobbied for his return. The conflict caused tensions between Muslims and Christians, though community relations in Florina were not severed. Throughout this period, Ali Riza Bey, a Muslim remained as mayor.

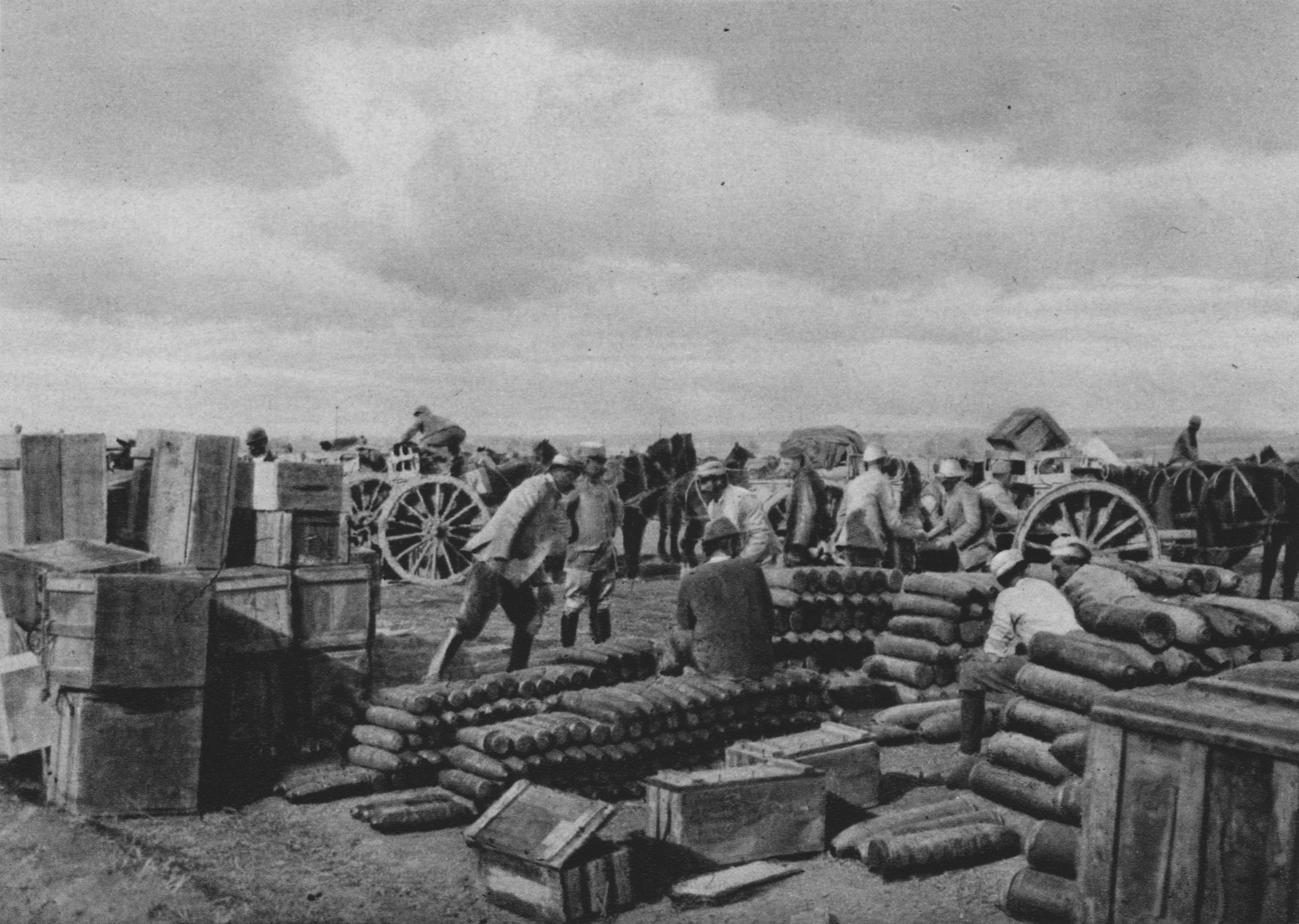
French army in Florina during WWI

In 1916, Florina became a World War I battleground of the Macedonian front and was occupied by Bulgaria and later retaken by the French army. Their presence in the town confirmed Greek control secured in the Balkan Wars. The previous Muslim mayor had left and Tegos Sapoutzis, a Greek became the new mayor. A Town Council was formed and a constitution adopted. Many pro–Bulgarian people or Muslims of Florina and in nearby areas were shot by Greek irregular troops of the Entente following the French capture of the town. In Florina, the French constructed multiple railway lines and stations, a barracks, stables, cemetery, and an army hospital. During World War One until 1922, the majority of serving town council representatives were Christian and a minority Muslim.

After the war all levels of Greek government approved Leguillon’s plan for Florina’s redevelopment from an Ottoman to a modern Europeanised urbanscape which involved relocations, demolitions, expropriations and new constructions. Opposition came from Muslim councillors whose many objections were ignored by the town council. A lack of organised trade between traders and local inhabitants resulted in the construction of a new central market and a livestock and grain market, approved by both Christian and Muslim town representatives. Parts of the Sakoulevas riverbed was altered and moved. The town centre in 1923 was shifted from the river to the south and linked to broad roads newly named after Pavlos Melas and Alexander the Great. Florina's demographics changed as a compulsory exchange of populations sent Muslims to Turkey and Orthodox Christians to Greece. Florina continued to be a multiethnic town following the Greek–Turkish population exchange, and as a consequence became a place with strict surveillance by the Greek state with cooperation from the local government and the Orthodox Church.

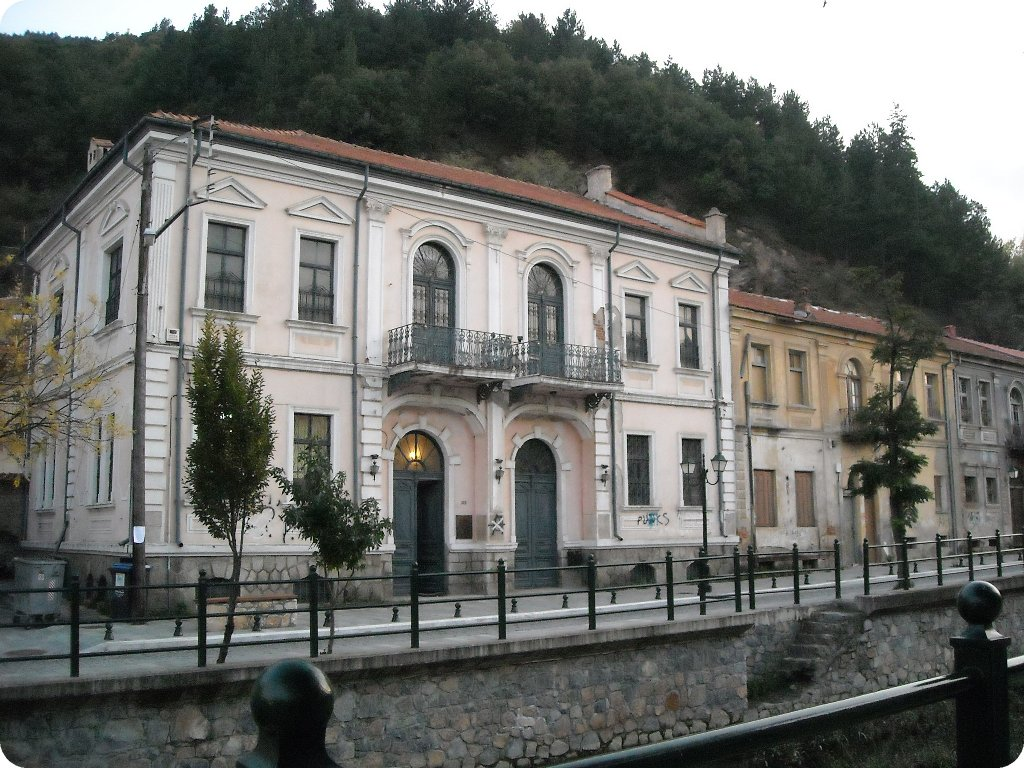
Neoclassical houses at the shoreline of Sakoulevas river

In the mid interwar period, settlement in Florina was often unregulated. Over time Leguillon’s plan was modified by municipal authorities to accommodate and resettle refugees, provide services, buy out former Muslim land owned by the Greek National Bank and redistribute it for new housing. In November 1925, known as the "Dynamite Attempt", Komitadjis attacked a coffee shop in Florina with a grenade injuring 2 children. Some perpetrators escaped to Albania, others were captured by Greek authorities and some locals allegedly involved were also arrested. During the Axis Occupation of Greece in World War II, Florina was under German control and the town became a centre of Slavic separatism. In April 1943 the German army sent the town's Jews first to Thessaloniki and later to the Auschwitz concentration camp where they were gassed. Amid the German retreat, Florina was bombed by the Allies on 28 July 1944. The Florina Jewish community numbered 64 people in 1945, a reduction of 95 percent due to the Holocaust.

Florina served as a garrison and prison town for the Greek government in the Greek Civil War (1946–1949). For part of the civil war the mountains of the Florina area were under communist control. The Slavic-Macedonian National Liberation Front, later simply the National Liberation Front or NOF, had a significant presence in the area: by 1946, seven Slav Macedonian partisan units were operating in the Florina area, and NOF had a regional committee based in Florina. When the NOF merged with the Democratic Army of Greece (DSE), many Slav Macedonians in the region enlisted as volunteers in the DSE.

In early February 1949, the Greek National Army and the Gendarmerie defeated an attempted takeover of Florina by the Greek communist Democratic Army of Greece. Communist casualties numbered 750–850 individuals and were all buried in a mass grave located in south-eastern Florina. On 12 February 1949, the Greek army defeated the Communists. Subsequently, thousands of communists and Slav Macedonians were evacuated or fled to Yugoslavia and to the Eastern Bloc.

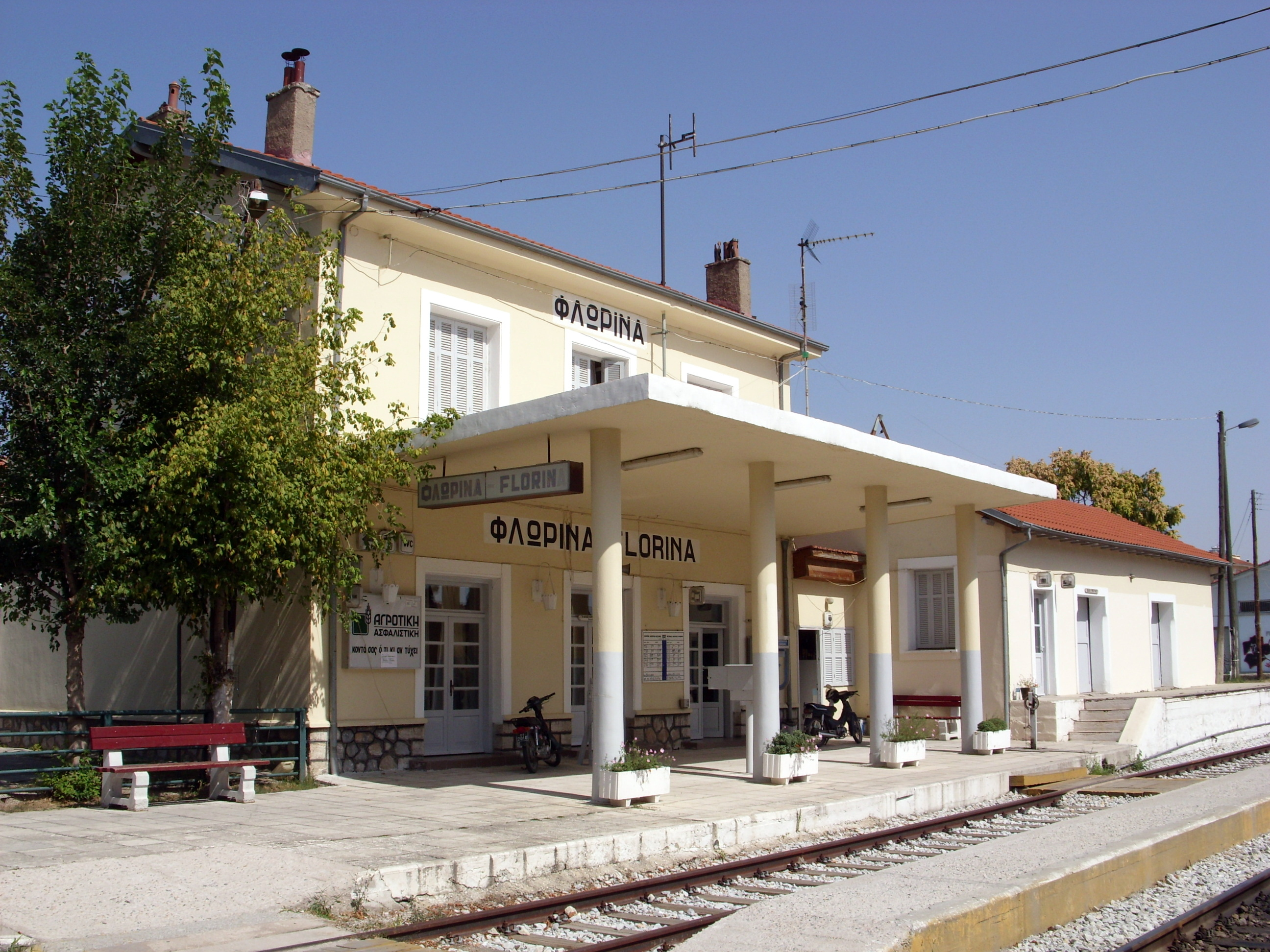
The Railway Station in Florina

Throughout both the Second World War and the Greek Civil War, Florina became a place of exile for entire populations of several villages. The growth of Florina was curbed by the duration of war and resumed again in the early 1950s. Postwar, the devastation and instability of the wider region caused locals to seek opportunities abroad and Florina as a provincial administrative centre was distrusted. Florina was a garrison town during the Cold War. The French plan was modified by municipal authorities in the 1960s and 1970s to accommodate changing urban circumstances and redevelopment needs intended to raise living standards in Florina. By the 1980s, immigration declined and later road infrastructure improvements led to Florina revitalising its links with the surrounding countryside.

== Transport ==
An extension of the rail line from Salonica to Monastir during 1893–94 was built close to Florina and the transport link to Monastir became significant for the town.

The city is served by Florina station on the Thessaloniki–Bitola line, with local trains to Thessaloniki.

In 2016 a new section of the A27 motorway was opened from Florina to the border with North Macedonia.

== Economy ==
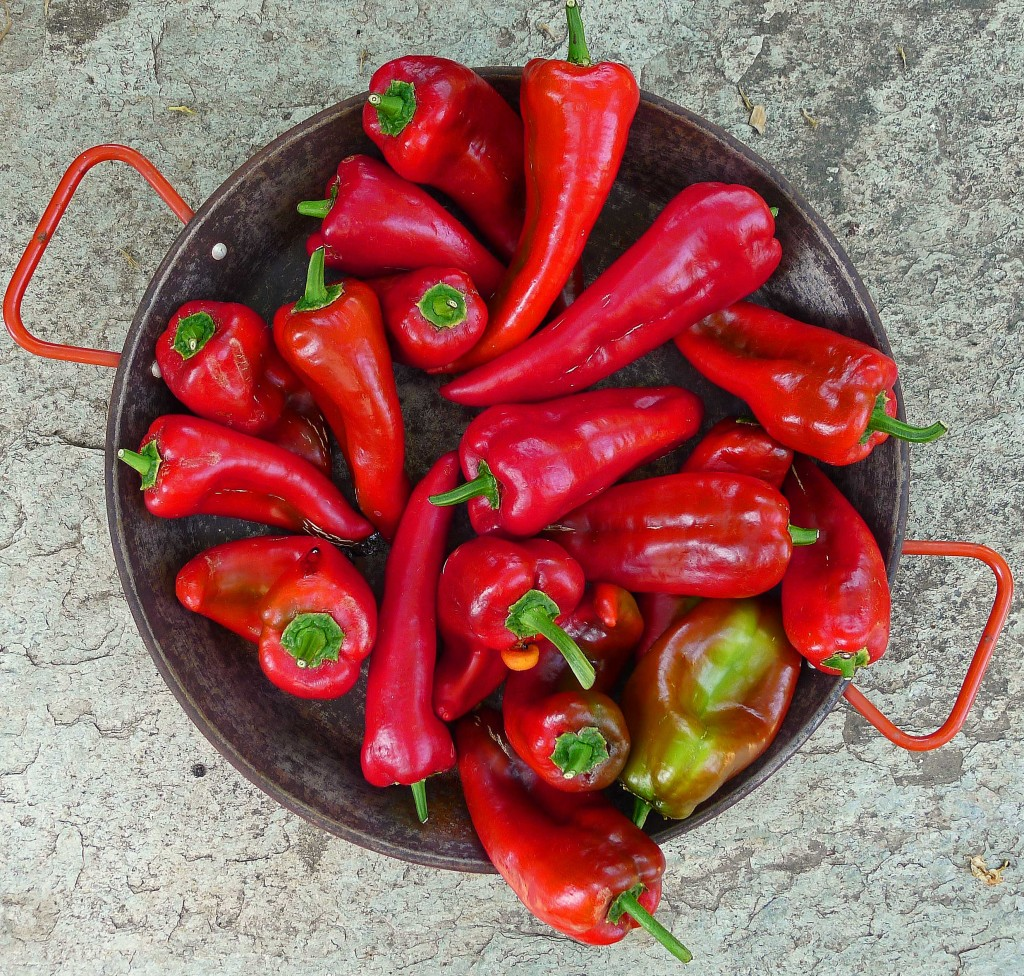
Florina peppers

In the late Ottoman period, the area of Western Macedonia experienced difficult economic circumstances, socio–political instability and mass emigration. Migrants from Florina went to America and the funds of returnees were used by Christians to buyout Muslim landowners. In Florina, Christians dominated commerce and of the 179 occupational categories listed in the 1910 census, Muslims were involved in only 33. The urban Christian community of Monastir migrated to Florina between 1913–1914 bringing European clothing styles and trades such as wax weaving to the town. Many newly arrived Jews were tailors. In the interwar period local Jews were involved in the textile, agricultural and raw material sectors of Florina's economy.

Florina is a market town with an economy dominated by agriculture, forestry, summer and winter tourism, cross-border trading and the sale of local produce such as grain, grapes, and vegetables including Florina peppers. It also has textile mills and is known for locally manufactured leather handicrafts.

An important market is held weekly and the town is engaged in commerce and is a location for the civil service. Florina serves the Prespa region and is a local centre for the wider area.

The most notable industrial activity is the very large Ptolemaia-Florina lignite mine.

During the 1950s and 1960s, the area lost much of its population to emigration, both to Athens and Thessaloniki as well as US, Canada, Australia and Germany. Following Greece's EU membership and the economic upturn, many from Germany returned.

== Education ==
Florina is a destination for high school attendance by youths from the wider countryside who later in many instances permanently relocate to the town.

== Media ==
The university in Florina changed in 2002 from being a branch of the Aristotle University of Thessaloniki, to a part of the University of Western Macedonia. After 2004, four departments that previously belonged to the Aristotle University, reinforced its potential.

Florina has 8 radio stations, 2 daily political newspapers, 4 weekly ones, one women's press and two newspapers on sports.

== Landmarks ==
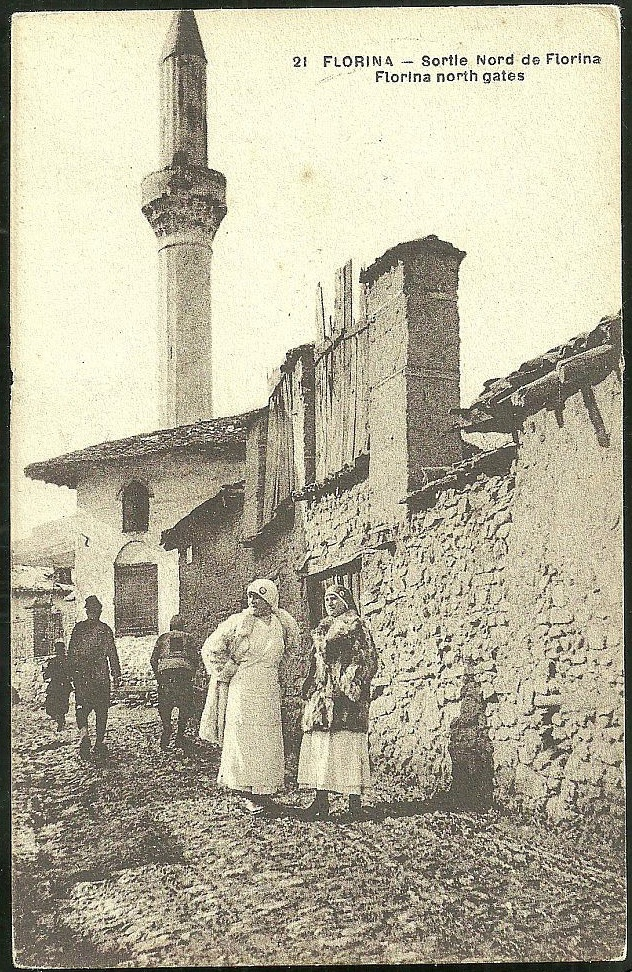
Florina, view from northern entrance (1916–1918)

The layout of Ottoman Florina was divided into neighbourhoods with their own names, often with irregular property lines, gardens, narrow dead–end streets. Turko–Macedonian style architecture dominated with homes often featuring two floors, projecting bays (sachnisia) and reception rooms (ondas). The Ottoman architectural landscape of several mosques, two bathhouses, a clock tower and some Ottoman mansions persisted until the 1923 population exchange. There were seven mosques and all were demolished during the twentieth century.

The first five mosques were demolished in 1926 by orders from the General Administration of Macedonia, the Florina prefect, and by the decision of the Municipal Council as retaliation for Turkish government actions toward Anatolian Christian monuments. The mosques of Florina were: Minare de Kapit mosque (destroyed), Minare Zantial mosque (demolished in 1928), Kursumli mosque or Minare Oso (destroyed), Minare Ouest mosque (destroyed) and another mosque (destroyed). In 1952, one mosque was still open in Florina. Carsi i Yakosu Bey mosque was built in the eighteenth century, the building and most of the minaret, excluding its base, were demolished between 1953–1954. Another destroyed building was the Tekke, where the site is the present location of the town's bank.

Other Ottoman era landmarks were the clock, located in the town centre and demolished in 1927; the Hamman (bathhouse), demolished in 1925 and the present site of the Papastefa house. The Muslim Cemetery located in the north of Florina was destroyed. The early Greek administration expropriated the site and implemented a new urban plan, intending to build a garden, later repurposed the area for a refugee quarter and followed by a land subdivision into lots in 1933. Another Hamman still exists, built at either the late sixteenth or early seventeenth century, it was in use until 1958 and in a poor state of preservation during the 2010s. The Koula, a fortification tower built either in the late eighteenth or early nineteenth century was part of a larger residential complex demolished in 1985, the tower remained but became dilapidated. The neighbourhood of Aristotelis, named after a local educational association was built in the area of the former Ottoman market.

Throughout the twentieth century, most Muslim monuments were destroyed and in the post 1960s reconstruction of Florina nearly all traces of the Muslim presence disappeared. Surviving Ottoman landmarks in a good state of preservation are the prison, built in the early twentieth century; and the administration building built in 1904 and later repurposed for Florina's courts following Ottoman rule.

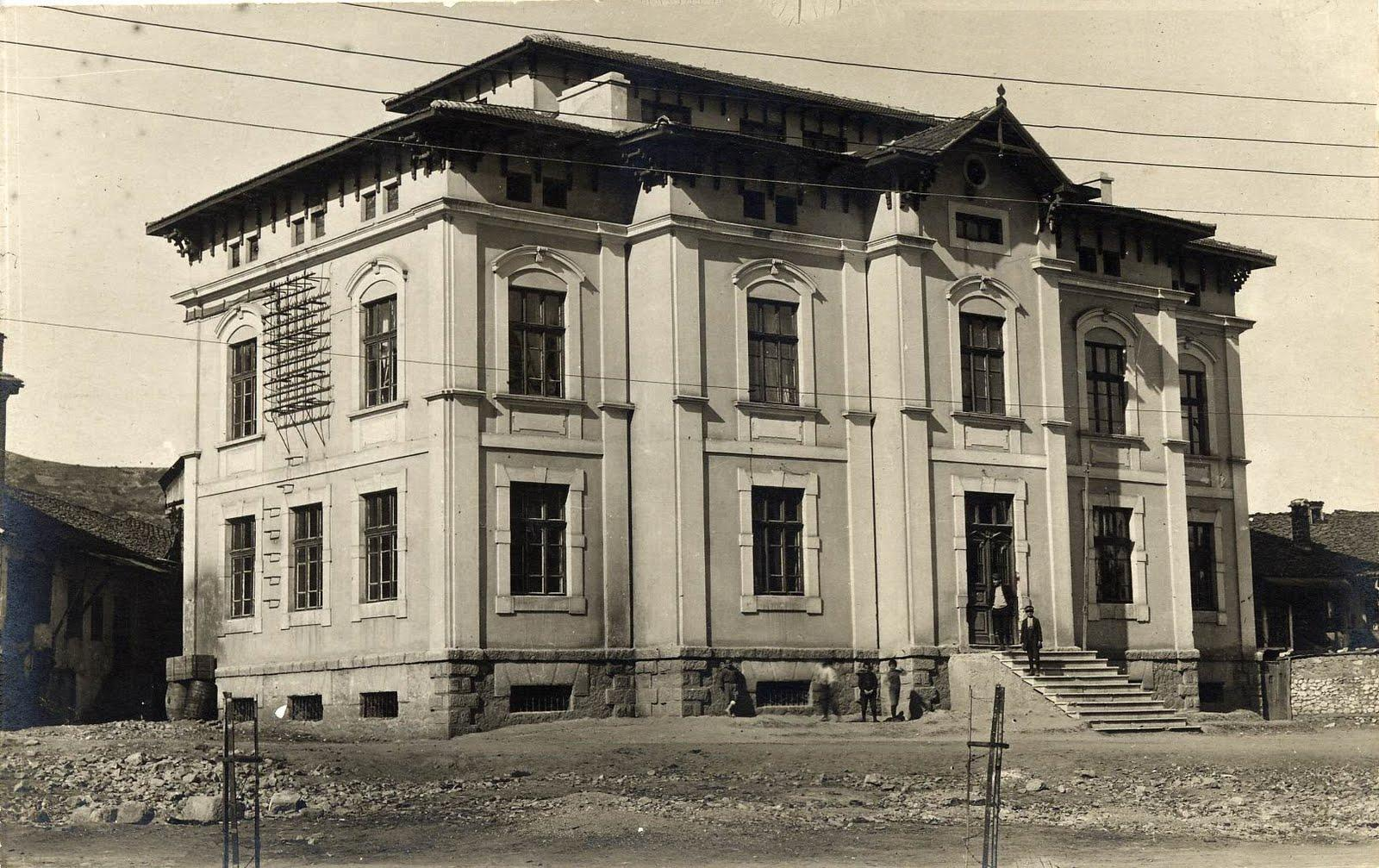
Bulgarian Exarchate school

After Florina became part of Greece, a new urban plan was undertaken by the government to modernise and Hellenise the town. Florina underwent change and sites or buildings associated with diverse past cultures and peoples such as mosques, synagogues and cemeteries disappeared. In the interwar period, local Turko–Macedonian styles continued. Other contemporary architectural styles such as Byzantine, Minoan, Classical, Art Deco, Baroque, Moorish, rustic French treatments either some on their own or as combinations were used in Florina for homes, shops and other buildings.

Post World War Two, there are no remaining traces of the Jewish cemetery in Florina. The Cathedral of St.Panteleimon was constructed in 1870 and Slavic architectural forms featured on its windows, three domes and an iconostasis with Slavic writing, later replaced with Greek writing. Over time modifications were made to the altar and windows. In 1971, the Cathedral was declared a hazard to public safety and demolished.

In Florina, a Bulgarian school was constructed between 1905–1908 by townspeople who were part of the Bulgarian Exarchate and it operated till 1913. Repurposed several times, it became a Greek high school twice and used in a military capacity by the French (WWI), Germans (WWII) and the Greek National Army (Greek Civil War). Later, it served as a Commercial School and the Economic High School (1961–1977). Earmarked for possible preservation by the government, the two-storey building was proposed to house the future Art Museum of Florina. Instead the school was demolished in late 1978 by the local municipal authority with support from Florina's Archbishop Kantiotis who opposed the building's Bulgarian Church origins. The site was rebuilt as a high school.

The government supported the construction of a new area along the urban periphery of Florina for people relocated from small villages near the Albanian border for national security reasons. It consists of generic identical houses centred around a school and church, built in Byzantine style. Modern architecture in Florina consists of apartment blocks and in the late 20th and early 21st centuries, bungalow style homes for nuclear families.

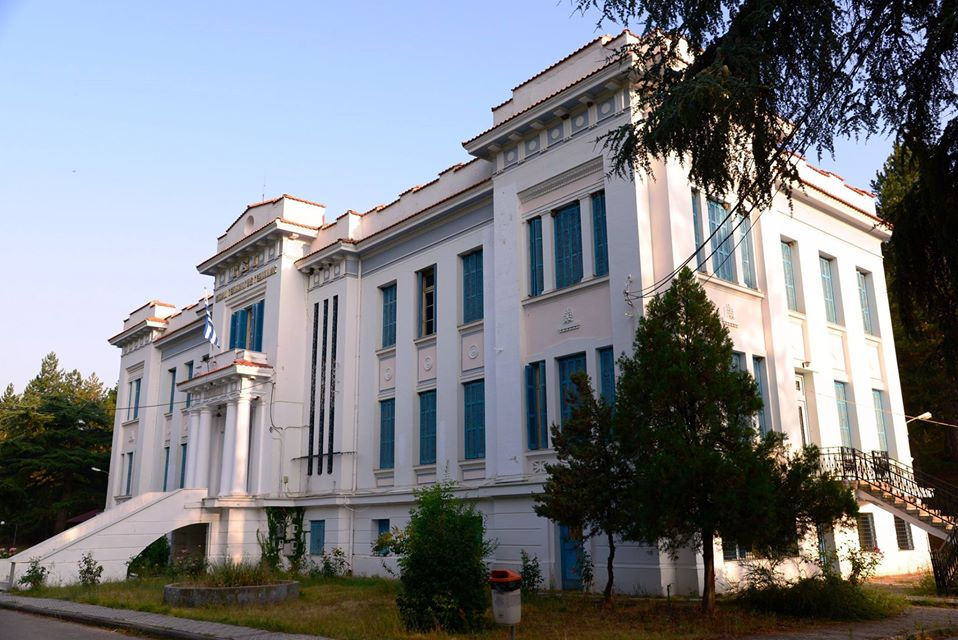
School of Agriculture

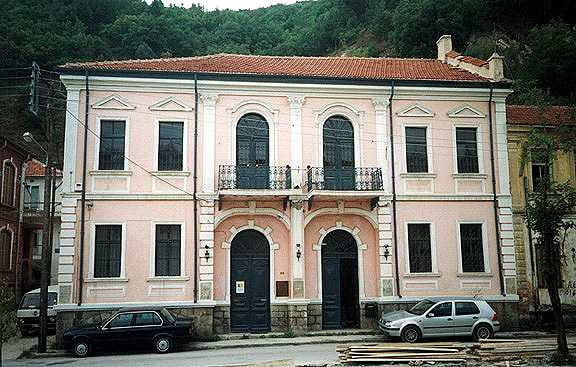
Florina Museum of Modern Art

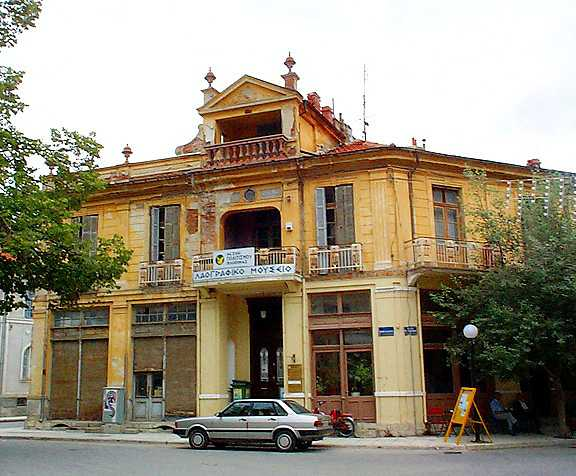
Folklore Museum of the Florina Culture Club

In early twenty first Florina, over 40 monuments exist in the town and include sculptures, statues, headstones, busts and other objects depicting or in reference to its history, in particular the struggle over Macedonia, the Second World War and the Civil War in Greece. There are twelve monuments of fighters such as Kapetan Kottas and politicians involved in the Macedonian Struggle placed mainly after 1960 in Florina to mark the success of Greek efforts over the Bulgarians. In the main town square named Omonia or Georgios Modis was formed in the late interwar period. The square has busts of Macedonian Struggle figure L. Pyrzas and the General I. Pappous of the National Army during the Civil War with a display of cannons taken from the Communists, the losing side in the conflict. These monuments were erected in an era when their visual presence and symbolism were used by the government as a way to assimilate the local multicultural inhabitants. Other town square monuments are the statue symbolising freedom and a memorial to Greek military casualties of the Greek Italian War (1940–1941). A square in Aristotelis neighbourhood was named “Square of the Seven Heroes of 1944” in 2016 to honour seven Aristotelis association members hanged by German troops. Florina has a military cemetery for fallen Greek soldiers from the Greek Civil War.

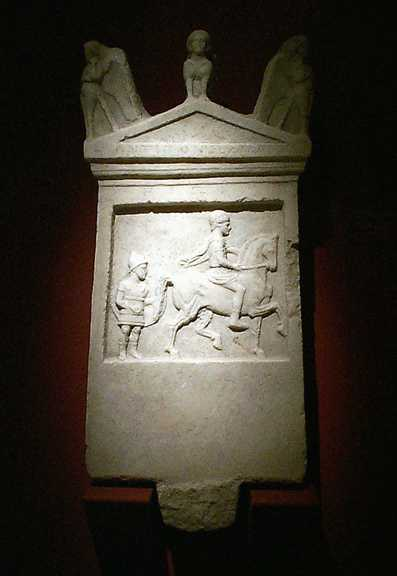
Grave stele of the Roman period, Archaeological Museum of Florina

In the mid 2000s, two attempts to erect a memorial to communist fighters who died during the 1949 attempted takeover of Florina were vandalised and destroyed by unidentified individuals. The Greek Communist Party bought the site in 2009 and erected a memorial in 2016 encompassing several sculpted individuals on the field commemorating the fighters. In 2005, three marble reproductions of funerary monuments were placed in the town centre, the ancient Greek originals dating from Classical and Roman antiquity are displayed in the Florina Archaeological Museum. There have been some efforts by local people to showcase Florina's heritage from the Ottoman period and other less highlighted or neglected parts of the town's past through an exhibition, a documentary film and a scholarly lecture. Some of these initiatives have also attempted to highlight past practices of censorship and received various responses with some local support or opposition.

- Archaeological Museum of Florina
- Florina Museum of Modern Art
- The Florina Art Gallery
- Folklore Museum of the Aristotle Association
- Folklore Museum of the Culture Club

== Demographics ==
Florina was a Christian settlement in the early period of Ottoman rule and Turks settled in the town. The population of 19th century Florina included Muslims, Bulgarians, Greeks, Jews, Aromanians, Slavophones and Romani. The numbers of the town population overall remained stable for several centuries until the late nineteenth century when demographic changes began to occur. Some population shifts were by Albanians (Christian and Muslim), Turks, Aromanians, Romani and Jews, along with Orthodox Greeks of the south migrating to Florina following the mid–19th century reforms of the Ottoman Tanzimat period. In the late Ottoman era 8,000 inhabitants lived in Florina and Muslims formed three quarters of the population and one quarter were Christian.

Austrian diplomat Johann Georg von Hahn visited the city in 1861 and wrote about it in his travel log From Belgrade to Salonica. In it he writes that "[a]bout the houses in Florina, we should indicate that there are at most 3,000, with half of the population Albanian and Turkish Muslims and the other half Christian Bulgarians." According to an 1878 French ethnographic book Florina was a town of 1,500 households, inhabited by 2,800 Muslims and 1,800 Bulgarians.

The traveller Victor Bérard visited Florina in 1896 and stated it had 1,500 houses composed of Albanians and "converted Slavs", with 100 "Turkish" families and 500 Christian families. Bérard wrote "these Slavs nonetheless call themselves Greek and speak Greek—with us at least", while in Florina a few hundred were Bulgarian supporters and the Ottoman administration in the area was pro–Bulgarian. Journalist H. N. Brailsford was in Macedonia in the aftermath of the Ilinden Uprising (1903). He wrote Florina's Greek bishop spoke in Turkish to the church congregation as they were "Bulgarians", while the town was viewed as Greek because it remained attached to the Patriarch.

A Jewish Sephardi community was present in Florina during the 17th century. Under Ottoman rule, the Jews of Florina had close ties with the Jewish community of Monastir (modern Bitola). Romani people migrated from Anatolia to Florina. In the mid to late 1910s, some Florina Romani migrated to Elbasan and Korçë and compose most of their urban modern Romani populations. In 1910, the Greek consular secretary Athanasios Chalkiopoulou wrote Florina had 6,500 Muslims, 2,156 Orthodox Greeks and 500 "schismatic Bulgarianizers".

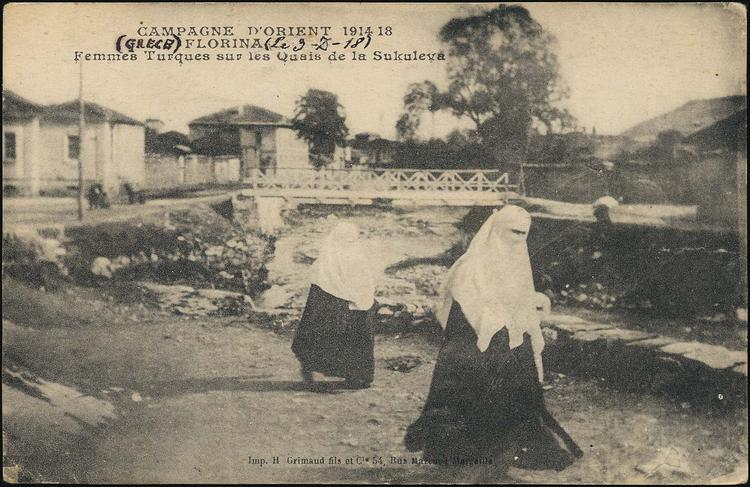
Turkish Women of Florina, (1916–1918)

According to historian Tasos Kostopoulos, after Florina became part of Greece, its population numbered 10,000 with two thirds being Muslim. Many Christian inhabitants of Florina were Slavic speakers with the remainder composed of 30 Aromanian families and 89 Greek refugee families from Thrace and Asia Minor. Florina Christians supported the Greek cause and the Bulgarians were aware that more than half were "Grecomans".

Efthymios Boudonas, a Public Education Office director and former school general inspector for Macedonia wrote (1914) Florina was a non–Greek speaking town incapable of linguistically hellenising its inhabitants or any non–Greek speaking newcomers, although it had a strong Greek faction. In 1916, Greek diplomat Nikolaos Politis wrote Florina had a total population of 10,392 composed of 6,227 Muslims, 3,576 Greeks and 589 former Exharchists.

Philologist André Mazon was in Florina and the wider area doing research in 1917–1918 and 1920. Florina had a total of 10,000 people. Mazon wrote Florina was populated by Turkicized Albanians and Christian Slavs, split almost evenly between 9000 inhabitants, with the remainder consisting of Greeks, Aromanians and Jews who had recently arrived from Bitola after its 1917 destruction. Much of the Christian population remained Patriarchists, even during the period of the Exarchate, with some becoming Hellenised and apart from a few exceptions they spoke (Macedonian) Bulgarian in their homes.

The Balkan Wars of 1912–1913 resulted in 450 families leaving Monastir (modern Bitola) and going to Florina. Following the conflict, the large Aromanian community in Monastir was disappointed the city became part of Serbia and departed for Greece. Many went to Thessaloniki and others settled in Florina, where in the late 1920s a new neighbourhood was established named Agia Paraskevi with a population of 600 refugee Aromanian families. The arrival of many hellenised Aromanians from Monastir to Florina resulted in the establishment of a large Greek speaking population in the region. During the First World War, 60 Jewish families resettled in Florina after they left Monastir in 1916 to avoid the shelling of the city, later some other Monastirli Jewish families also went to live in Florina after the war.

The 1920 Greek census recorded 12,513 people in the town, and 4,650 inhabitants (1,076 families) were Muslim in 1923. Muslim Albanians from Florina and the wider region during the Greek–Turkish population exchange (1923) based on religious criteria were sent to Turkey, and mainly resettled in Bursa. Following the Greek–Turkish population exchange, Greek refugee families in Florina were from East Thrace (79), Asia Minor (54), Pontus (7) and the Caucasus (44) in 1926. Greek refugees were resettled in the former "Turkish" Quarter. The Aromanian inhabitants of Pisoderi migrated to Florina as trade from Albania decreased.

The 1928 Greek census recorded 10,585 town inhabitants. Florina inhabitants who partook in elections numbered 1,579 and were listed in the 1928 census. Their composition was 45 percent "yiyeneis" (neither refugees or always denoting natives), 17 percent from Monastir, 15 percent from Asia Minor, 7 percent from Pontus, 3 percent from Thrace, 2 percent from Pisoderi and 2 percent Jews. In Florina the total number of refugees in 1928 was 3,612. Refugee families from the Greco–Turkish population exchange numbered 178 (750 people) in 1928. and the Jewish community numbered 500 people. The town remained multiethnic and continued to have Slavophones, Jews and Romani after the population exchange. In 1930 refugee groups from Monastir, Asia Minor, Thrace and southern Albania had formed civic associations in the town. The Monastir association gained land in 1931 to establish a Monastir Quarter. A Northern Epirote Quarter was also formed. The population of Greeks increased from 2,000 in 1905 to 8,000 in 1928.

Florina was occupied in World War Two and Jews came under German rule. The Jewish community numbered 400 people in 1940. During April 1943, 372 Florina Jews were sent by the Germans first to the Hirsch ghetto in Thessaloniki and later in May sent to the Auschwitz concentration camp where they were gassed. In 1945, the Florina Jewish community numbered 64 people, a reduction of 84 percent due to the Holocaust. The Jewish population declined and by 1959 there were 7 Jews in Florina, 1 in 1973 and 0 in 1983.

In the late 1960s, the inhabitants of Trivouno, a Slavophone village were forcibly relocated by the Greek government for reasons of development and security to the neighbourhoods of Florina. The Romani of Florina are sedentary and in 1968 they converted from Islam to Orthodoxy. In the modern period, Florina Romani have distanced themselves from their relatives in Elbasan and Korçë, over concerns that links with Muslim Romani could negatively impact their local standing in the area they reside.

During the late twentieth century, Florina numbered some 15,000 inhabitants. Its population was composed of Slavophone Dopii, the Greek Anatolian refugees from the Greek–Turkish population exchange and their descendants, Greeks who had recently left the former Soviet Union, Aromanians and Hellenised Aromanians from Bitola who went to Florina in 1913, Romani, Albanians, and a small number of foreigners.

In fieldwork done by Riki Van Boeschoten in late 1993, the population of Florina is mixed and Greek is often the language used for communication. Minority languages are used in the town, especially on market days when farmers from the villages arrive in Florina to sell their produce. The Romani community of Florina speak Romani and are multilingual in all other languages used in the region. Van Boeschoten estimated the Romani numbered some 3000 in Florina, living in a neighbourhood on the town's environs.

Official pamphlets in Greek of the early 1990s listed the people of Florina as "yigeneis (autocthonous), Vlachs, Arvanites, Pontii, Mikrasiates, and ‘tsinganoi’ (Gypsies)". Macedonian–speaking inhabitants were not named and subsumed within the term "yigeneis" (meaning earth–born) implying they belong to a wider grouping of locals. In some folkloric publications from the area in English, "yigeneis", describing such contexts was translated to mean "local ethnic Greeks".

Rainbow, a political party representing the Macedonian minority in Greece is headquartered in Florina since 1995. Founded in 2022, the Centre for the Macedonian Language in Greece is based in Florina.

Year	Town	Municipal unit	Municipality
1981	12,573	-	
1991	12,355	14,873	-
2001	14,985	17,500	-
2011	17,907	19,985	32,881
2021	17,188	19,198	29,500

== In popular culture ==
Florina and the surrounding area of the late Ottoman and population exchange periods is the setting for the novel Devastated Hills: Macedonia 1900 by writer Necati Cumalı. In Greek cinema, several movies filmed in Florina by Theodoros Angelopoulos are The Suspended Step of the Stork, Ulysses' Gaze and The Beekeeper.

== Notable people ==
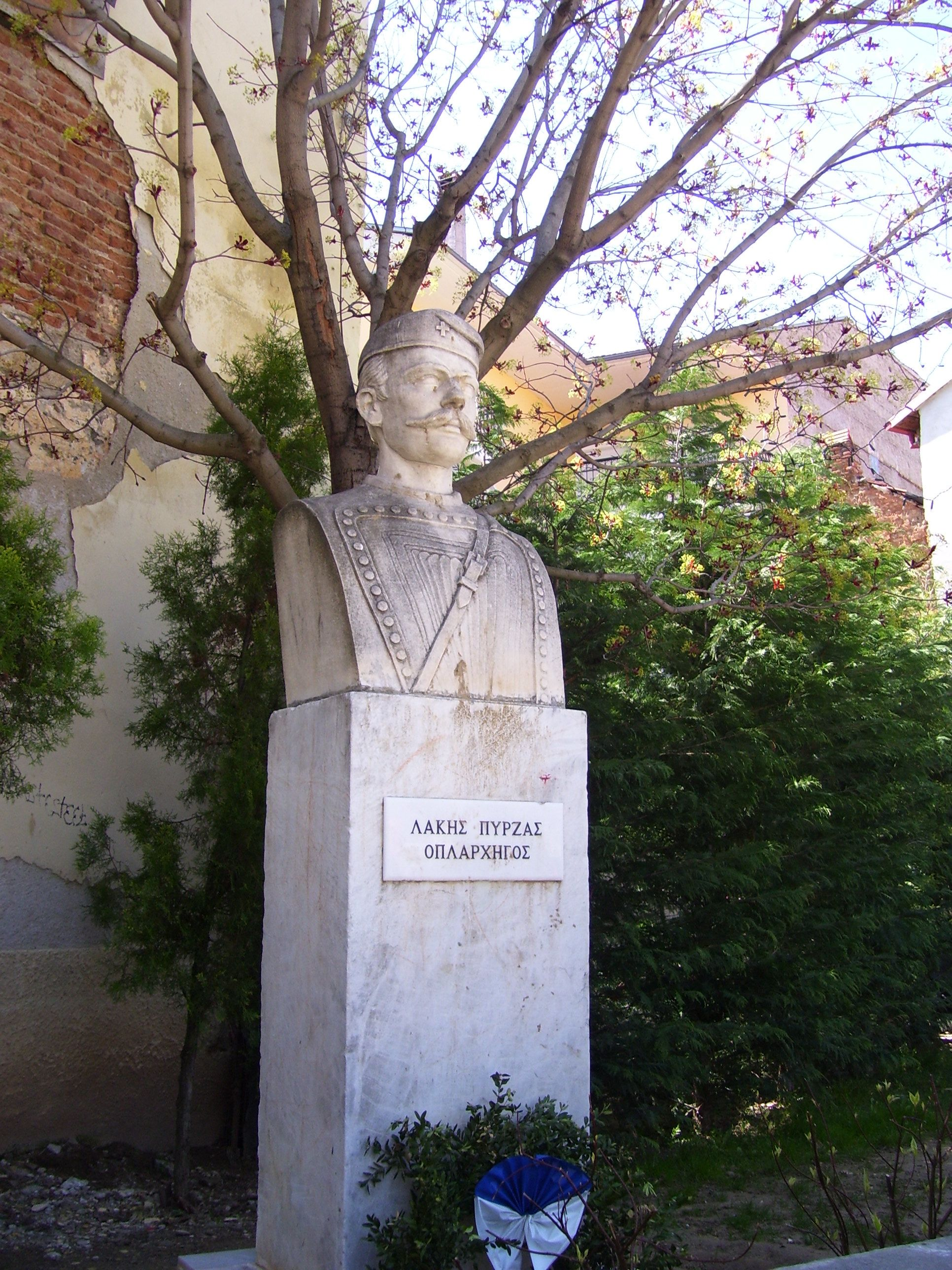
A bust of Nikolaos Pyrzas

- Alexis Alexoudis (born 1972), footballer
- Mary Coustas (born 1964), Australian actor
- Necati Cumalı (1921–2001), Turkish novelist, short–story writer & poet
- Peter Daicos Australian Football player (AFL); family from Vevi, Florina region
- Dimitrios Makris (1901–81), Member of Parliament & Minister
- Pericles A. Mitkas (born 1962), electronic & computer engineer, Aristotle University of Thessaloniki rector
- Nikolaos Pyrzas (1880–1947), leader during the Macedonian Struggle
- Nadia Tass (active 1979 to present), Australian director & actor
- Pavlos Voskopoulos (born 1964), politician & leader of the Rainbow party
- Elpida Karamandi (1920–1942), partisan fighter
- Sterikas Koulis (1922-1995), painter

== Gallery ==
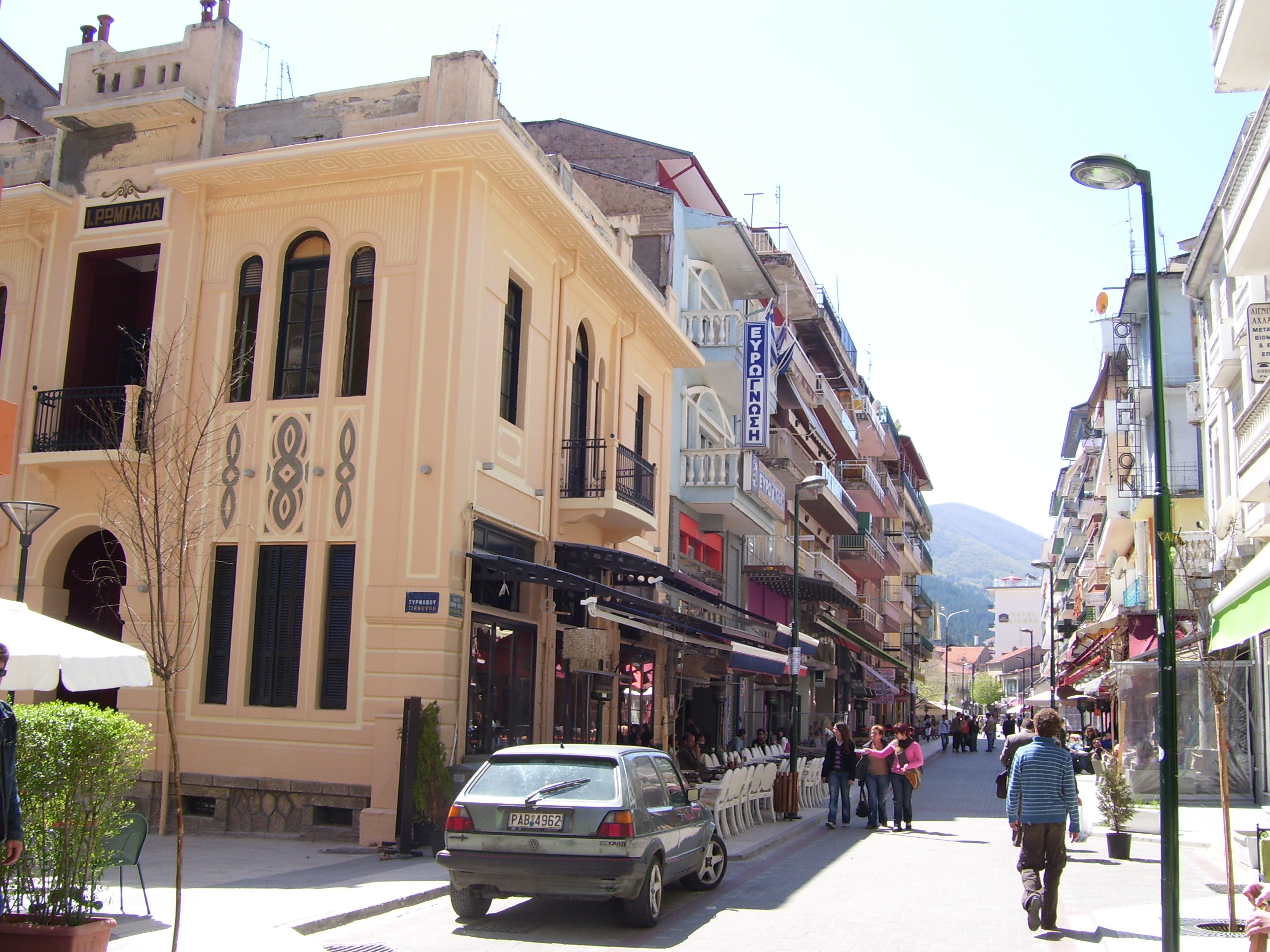
Main street

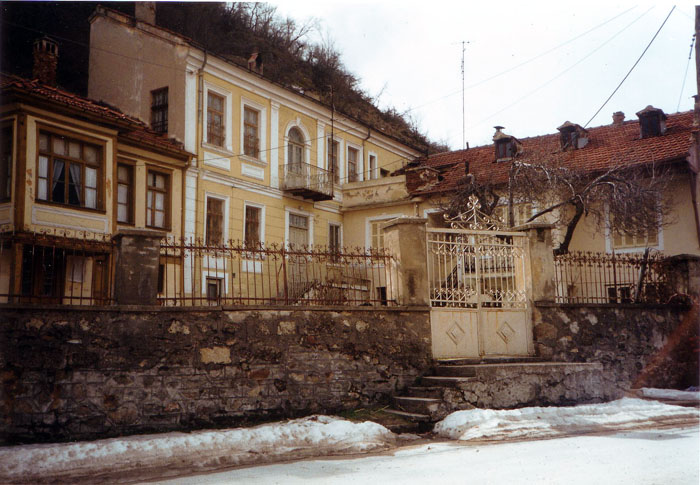
House in Florina. Scenery of Angelopoulos film O Melissokomos

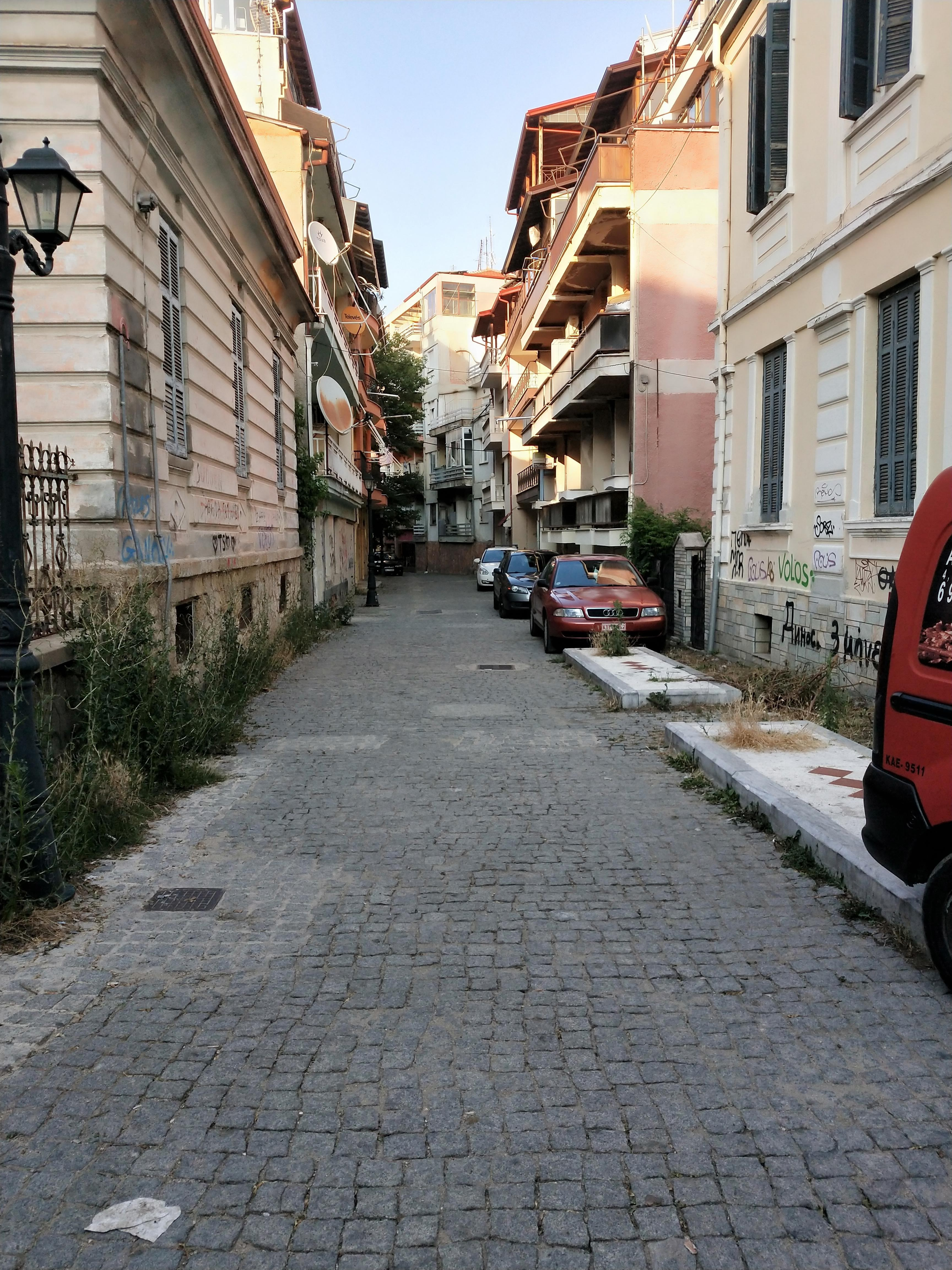
A side street leading to the river Sakoulevas

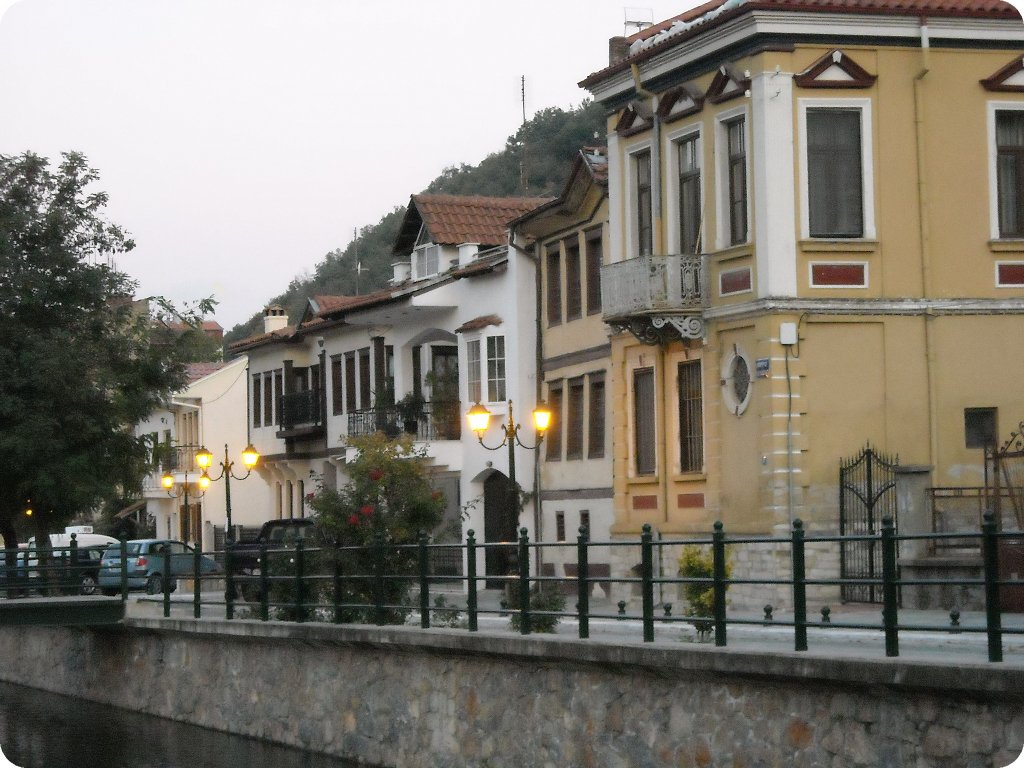
Neoclassical houses at the shoreline of Sakoulevas river

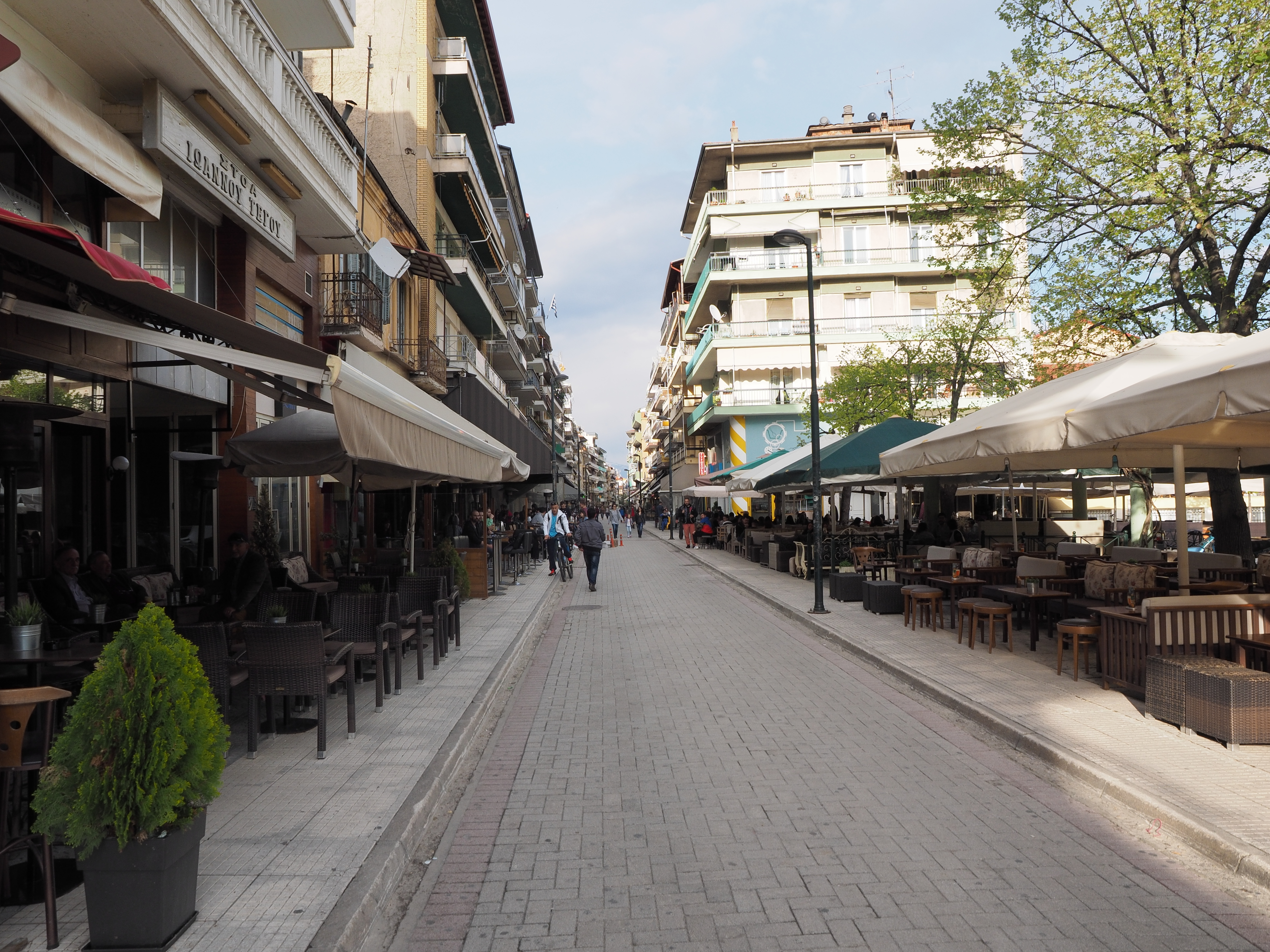
Pedestrian street at the centre

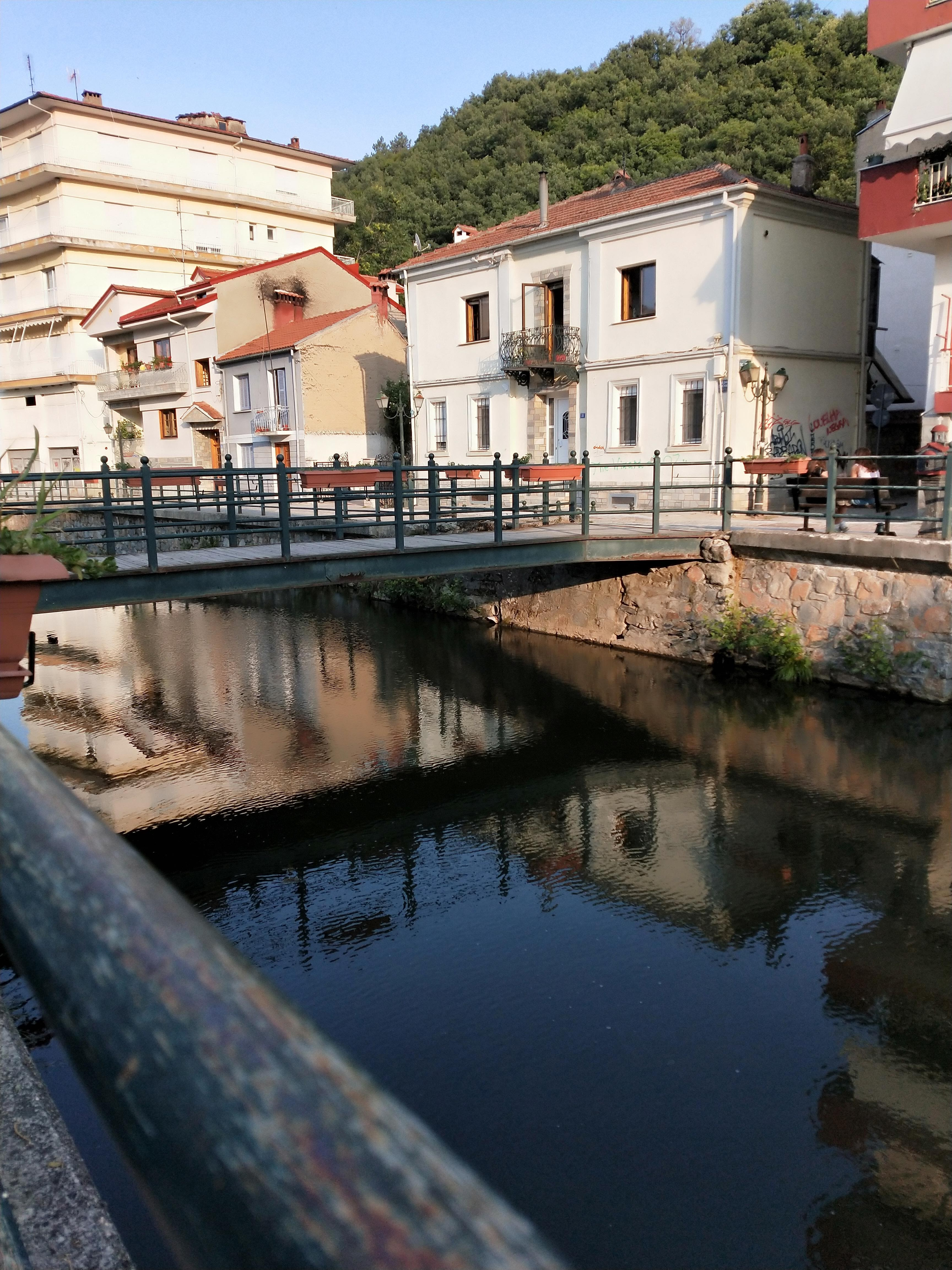
Famous river of Florina, Sakoulevas
