= Folklore Museum of the Aristotle Association =

- Λαογραφικό Μουσείο Συλλόγου «Ο Αριστοτέλης»
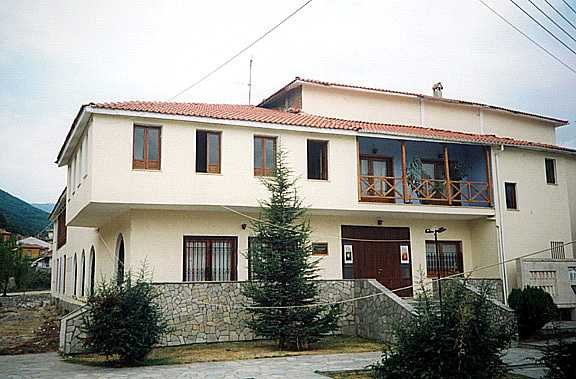
- Outside view
- Established: 1987
- Location: Florina, Greece
- Coordinates: 40.777758637068786°N 21.404074129426316°E
- Type: Art museum
- Collection size: ~5000 objects
- Founder: Aristotle Association

The Folklore Museum of the Aristotle Association (Greek: Λαογραφικό Μουσείο Συλλόγου «Ο Αριστοτέλης») located in the northern Greek city of Florina and housed at 7-Heroon-1944 Square.

== History ==
The Aristotle Association was founded in Florina on 30 July 1941 for the main purpose of promoting a Greek identity to the local Slavophone population. This was done as a response to the Bulgarian identity which was prevalent at the time. In 1958, some of the members began to collect artefacts of local folk culture (from the Prespa villages and the Florina plain) in the old prison building. In 1987, the folklore collection, which was still growing, was transferred to the Aristotle Association's new premises in the city centre and is now a museum.

== Exhibits ==
The exhibits are displayed in thematic groups. For instance, there is clothing, with the traditional costumes of refugee women from Eastern Rumelia and Northern Epirus, from the villages of Kato Kleines and Flambouro respectively, and many local costumes for young and older people; weaving, with looms, distaffs, spindles, and so on; agricultural occupations, with tools for ploughing, winnowing, repairing, and so on; household utensils, with saucepans, long-handled coffee-pots, covered casserole dishes; and reception rooms.

There are also tools and examples of occupations that were once very important in the Florina area, such as shoemaking, saddlery, and photography. Of particular note are the examples of wax-weaving, a craft of Byzantine origin that started to flourish in Florina when the refugees from Monastir arrived and continues to the present day.

== Gallery ==
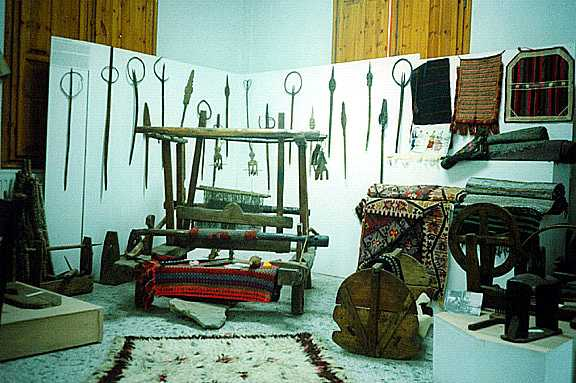
Traditional household utensils

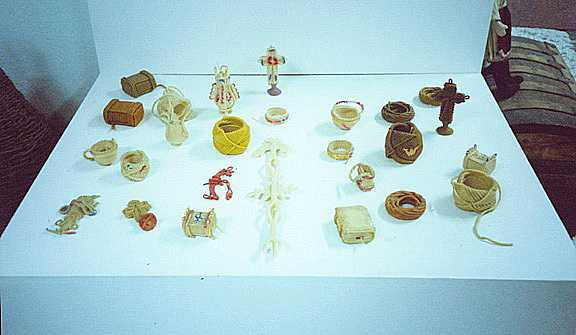
Exhibits of wax-weaving

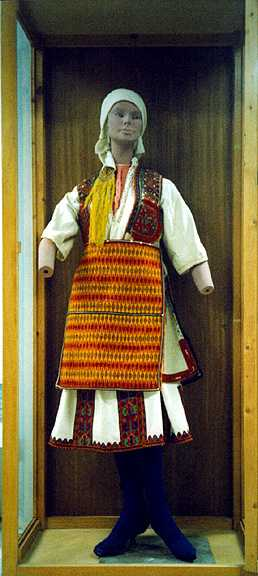
Local women's costume

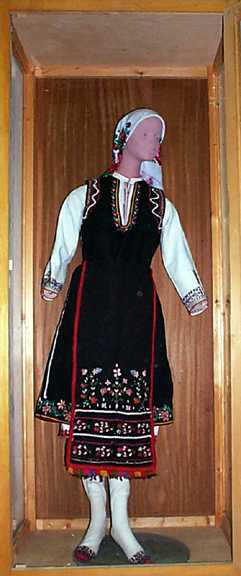
Traditional costume (Note: Traditional costumes of refugee women from Eastern Roumelia and Northern Epiros, from the villages of Kato Kleines.)
