= Folklore Museum of the Florina Culture Club =

Coordinates: 40.7788°N 21.4025°E

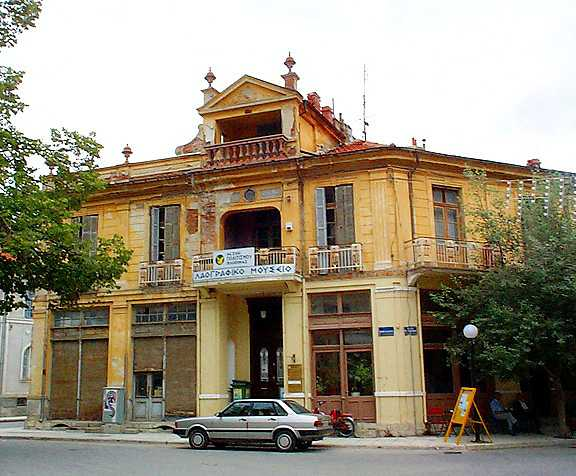
Outside view of the Museum

The Florina Culture Club was founded in 1980, originally as a film club. It later branched out into other activities, one of which was the founding of the Folklore Museum in the former Diethnes Hotel, a building in the eclectic style in the city centre.

The exhibits come from all over the prefecture. The museums speciality is exhibits connected with bee-keeping, of which it has one of the finest collections in Greece, which has been included in the Melina educational programme. There is a display of old wooden and clay hives and accessories for collecting honey and royal jelly, and there are also photographs illustrating the art of apiculture as it was practised in days gone by. In the exhibition rooms visitors can also see a variety of traditional everyday wear from the Florina area, looms, weaving implements, agricultural implements (for ploughing, reaping, threshing, and subsidiary activities), objects for everyday use (mainly cooking utensils), and a collection of medicinal plants and aromatic herbs.

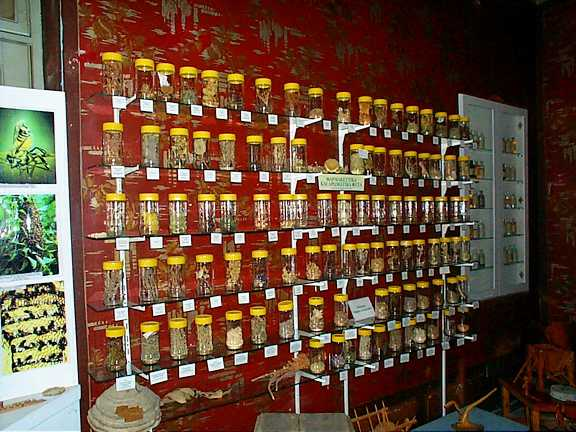
Collection of medicinal plants and aromatic herbs

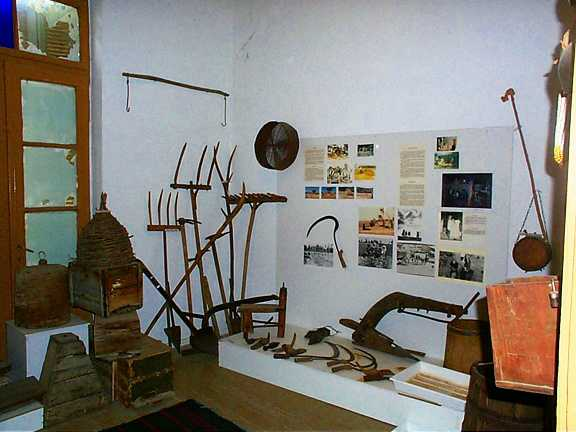
Agricultural implements for ploughing, reaping, and subsidiary activities

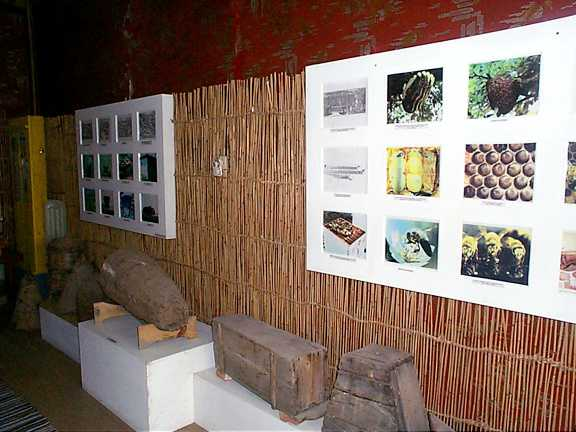
Exhibits connected with traditional bee-keeping

== Sources ==
- This article incorporates text from the corresponding article at the Museums of Macedonia website, commissioned by the Macedonian Heritage foundation, written by Vlasis Vlasidis, and published under a CC-BY-SA-3.0 license.
