= Florina pepper =

Greek variety of capsicum

Florina
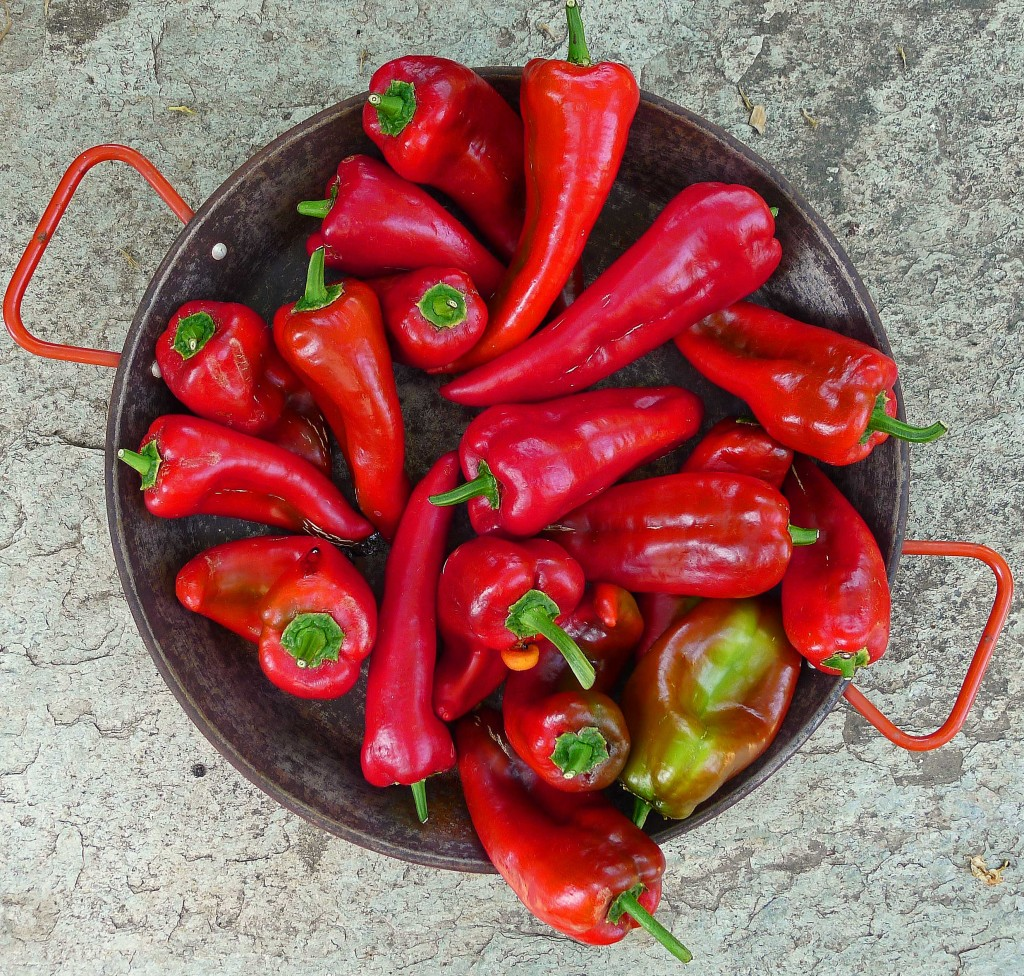
- Genus: Capsicum
- Origin: Florina, Greece

The Florina pepper (Greek: πιπεριά Φλωρίνης) is a pepper cultivated in the northern Greek region of Western Macedonia, specifically in the wider area of Florina, for which it is named. It boasts a deep red color and is shaped like a cow's horn. Initially, the pepper has a green hue, ripening into red, after the 15th of August. Renowned in Greece for its rich sweet flavor, the red pepper is utilized in various Greek dishes and is exported abroad in various canned forms. Typically hand-stripped, it retains the natural scents of pepper and is topped with extra virgin olive oil, salt, and vinegar.

== History ==
The seed was brought from Brazil to the region in the 17th century, and cultivated by the locals in Florina, Prespes, Veroia, Aridaia, and Kozani but only in Florina its cultivation was successful, where it adapted to the climate and soil, and eventually the other regions stopped cultivating the pepper, leaving Florina as its sole producer. The pepper belongs to the capsicum genus of the nightshade family Solanaceae. Florina's red peppers were awarded the recognition of Protected Designation of Origin in 1994 by the World Trade Organization (WTO). Every year during the last days of August, in a small local village in Aetos, Florina a feast of peppers is held, including celebrations with music bands and cooked recipes, based on peppers which are offered to all the guests.

== Cultivation ==
High productivity and adaptation of the plant can be achieved in efficiently draining soils, full sunny locations, and low winds to protect its branches and roots from sensitivity. The most convenient temperatures for its growth are 20 to 26 °C during the mid-day and 14 to 16 °C during the night. The harvest typically spans up to 18 weeks, with peppers ripening to maturity after mid-August. A good-quality red pepper from Florina should exhibit a bright color, thickness, firmness, and a sweet flavor. Consumption should be avoided if the pepper appears dull, cracked, or deteriorated, as these are indicators of reduced vegetables quality.

== Cooking and recipes ==
The red peppers of Florina are usually roasted and stuffed with different combinations of foods, as rice, meat, shrimps and feta cheese. These sweet peppers are used in sauces, salads, pasta, meat recipes or mashed, creating a pâté with traditional recipes. They can also be dried, canned, frozen and pickled, usually garnishing Greek salads. They can be roasted, sliced and served as an appetizer, by adding olive oil, garlic and sea salt. A well-known traditional recipe in Greece with stuffed peppers is Gemista.

== See also ==
- Bell peppers
- Black peppers
- Capsicum cultivars
- Chili peppers
- Pepperoncini
