= Nikolaos Pyrzas =

Greek chieftain

Kapetan (Chieftain) Nikolaos Pyrzas
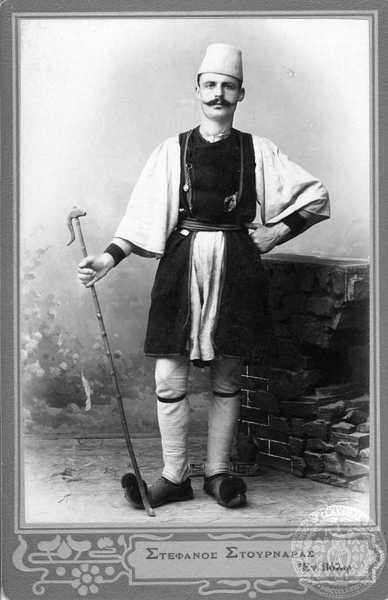
- Nikolaos Pyrzas on 7 May 1904 by Stafanos Stournaras.
- Native name: Νικόλαος Α. Πύρζας
- Nicknames: Lakis (Λάκης); Mikis Zezas (Μίκης Ζέζας)
- Born: c. 1880; Florina, Monastir Vilayet, Ottoman Empire (now Greece)
- Died: c. 1947 Florina, Kingdom of Greece
- Allegiance: Kingdom of Greece
- Branch: HMC
- Conflicts: Macedonian Struggle
- Awards: Commemorative Medal for the Macedonian Struggle
- Other work: Found of the National Committee of Florina

Nikolaos (or Lakis) A. Pyrzas (Greek: Νικόλαος Α. Πύρζας; 1880–1947) was a Greek chieftain from Florina who contributed to the Macedonian Struggle.

== Life ==
He was born in Florina in 1880 and together with Pavlos Kyrou and Kottas, was one of the first chieftains who started the Macedonian Struggle in the area.

In February 1904 he went to Athens to meet Pavlos Melas, so that the defence against the IMRO could be organised, and they started acting in the region of Florina. Later he wrote to the Greek consul of Thessaloniki, Lambros Koromilas, about the need to take measures against the Bulgarian danger. Moreover, he informed the Greek consul of Bitola, Spyridon Levidis, that he was willing to form an armed group thirty-strong. He was Melas' deputy chief of staff during three expeditions in Western Macedonia.

He was with Melas in the fight that cost the life of the latter in October 1904. Before Melas died, he asked Pyrzas to give the cross he was wearing to his wife, and his weapon to his son. Lakis Pyrzas fulfilled the wish of his friend and leader and so he went to Athens, where he lived until June 1904 working for the Hellenic Macedonian Committee.

He returned to Macedonia using Pavlos Melas's nom de guerre, Mikis Zezas, under the command of Georgios Tsontos (Kapetan Vardas). After a dispute with him, Pyrzas was forced to retire; he went to Egypt and returned to Florina after the Hellenic Army liberated it in 1912.

He died in Florina in 1947.

A bust of him was erected in Florina in 1960.

== Images ==
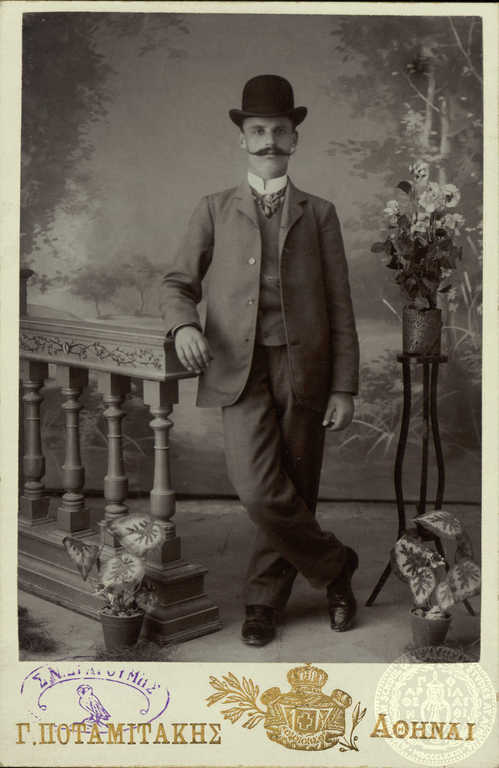
Nikolaos Pyrzas on 24 February 1904.

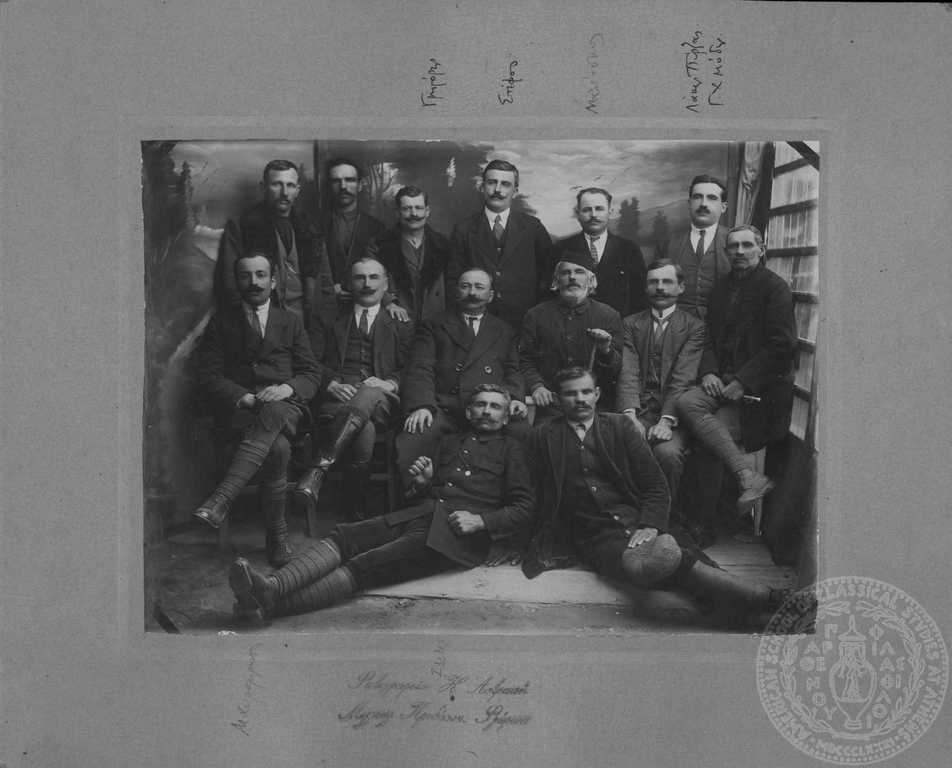
Nikolaos Pyrzas (middle row, second from right) with other Greek chieftains during the Macedonian Struggle.

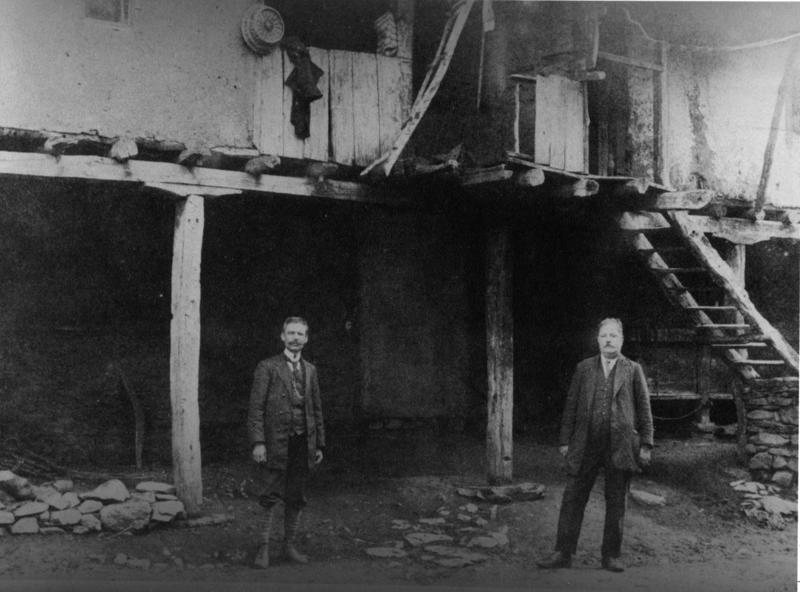
Nikolaos Pyrzas and Petros Hatzitasis in Statitsa in front of the house where Pavlos Melas was killed c. 1920s.

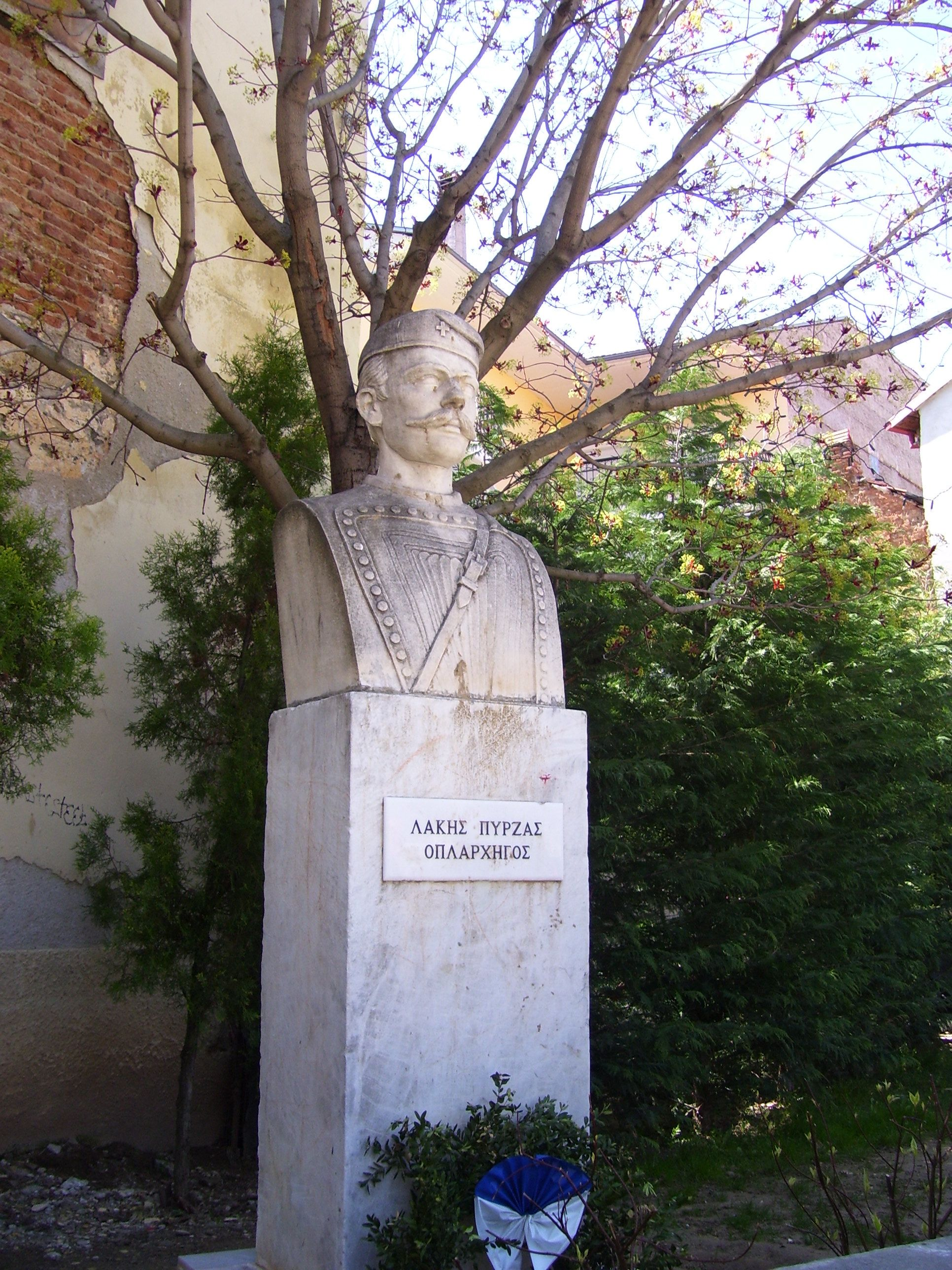
A bust of Nikolaos Pyrzas in Florina.

== Sources ==
- Πάνου Παπασταμάτη (1960). Στίλπωνος Π. Κυριακίδου (ed.). Ο οπλαρχηγός καπετάν Λάκης Πύρζας (έτ. Δ΄, τεύχ. 20ον, 8ον, σ. 80). Φλώρινα: Αριστοτέλης.
- Ιωάννης Σ. Κολιόπουλος (2008). Αφανείς, γηγενείς Μακεδονομάχοι. Θεσσαλονίκη: Εταιρεία Μακεδονικών Σπουδών, University Studio Press. p. 179.
