= Nikostratos Kalomenopoulos =

Greek Army officer

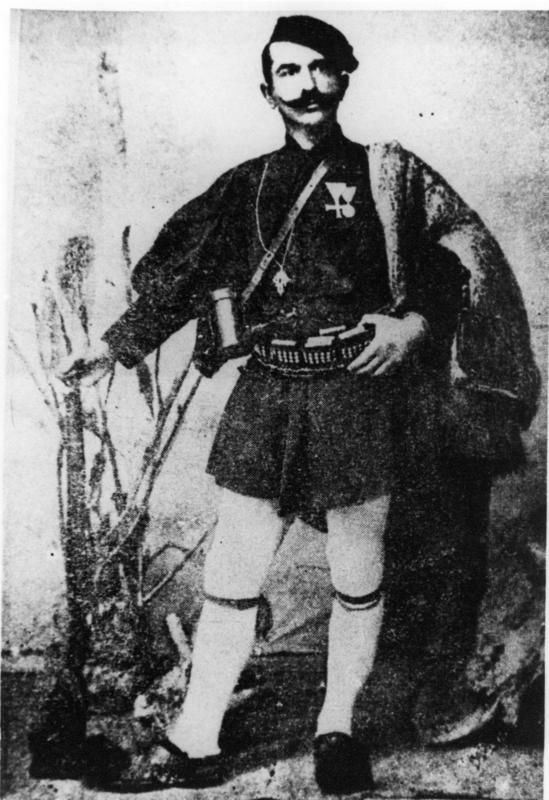
- Kalomenopoulos during the Macedonian Struggle
- Native name: Νικόστρατος Καλομενόπουλος
- Nicknames: Kapetan Nidas; Καπετάν Νίδας
- Born: c. 1865; Syros, Kingdom of Greece
- Died: 1952 Athens, Kingdom of Greece
- Allegiance: Kingdom of Greece
- Branch: Hellenic Army
- Service years: 1891–1921
- Rank: Major General
- Commands: Lesbos Infantry Regiment (1914–1916); 3rd Serres Regiment (1917); 8th Infantry Division (1918–1919); Commander of Smyrna Occupation (1919); Military Governor of Athens (1920–1921)
- Conflicts: Greco-Turkish War (1897); Cretan Revolt; Macedonian Struggle (POW); Balkan Wars; First Balkan War; Battle of Sarantaporo (WIA); Second Balkan War; World War I; Macedonian front; Greco-Turkish War (1919–1922); Occupation of Smyrna

Nikostratos Kalomenopoulos (Greek: Νικόστρατος Καλομενόπουλος) was a Greek revolutionary and Army officer who reached the rank of major general. He is also known by his nom de guerre Kapetan Nidas.

== Biography ==
He was born at Syros in about 1865. After studies in the NCO School, he was commissioned an infantry second lieutenant in 1891. In 1892, he went in disguise to Crete, then still under Ottoman rule, and secretly mapped the island, but was discovered, arrested, and expelled. In 1896, he joined the Cretan uprising against the Ottomans and was elected as head of the Amari Province. In 1897, he joined the Greek expeditionary force to the island under Colonel Timoleon Vassos.

In 1905, following the death of Pavlos Melas, he rushed to join the Macedonian Struggle. In Macedonia, he adopted the nom de guerre Kapetan Nidas and became a chieftain of an armed band that operated around Florina. On 15 April 1905, he and his band were surrounded by a force of 200 Ottoman troops. Following the battle that ensued, several Makedonomachoi were killed or wounded while Kalomenopoulos was captured by the Ottoman authorities and condemned to five years imprisonment at Monastir, but managed to escape three years later. He fought in the Balkan Wars of 1912–1913, being wounded during the Battle of Sarantaporo in 1912.

In 1914–1916 he commanded the Lesbos infantry regiment, and the 3rd Serres Regiment in the Serres Division in 1917. In 1918–19 he commanded the 8th Infantry Division, and in 1919, he served as garrison commander of Smyrna during its occupation by the Hellenic Army. In 1920, he was military governor of Athens, and retired in August 1921.

Apart from his military career, Kalomenopoulos was also the author of a number of topographic, military, and historical studies, including on the military history of the Byzantine Empire. He is considered one of the best military writers in Greece.

He died in Athens in 1952.
