= Kalamaras =

Kalamaras is a surname. Notable people with the surname include:

- George Kalamaras, American poet and educator
- Meletios Kalamaras (1933–2012), Greek Orthodox bishop
- Polyneikis Kalamaras, Greek boxer
- Stylianos Kalamaras, American boxer and judoka

== See also ==
- Fotini Markopoulou-Kalamara (born 1971), Greek theoretical physicist and design engineer
