= Florina Art Gallery =

- Πινακοθήκη Φλωρινιωτών Καλλιτεχνών
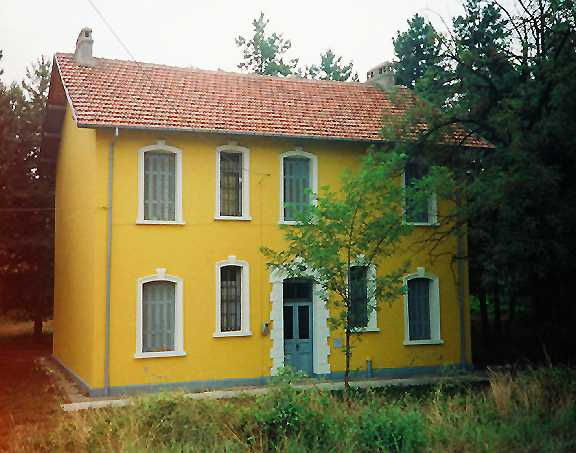
- Outside view
- Established: 1985
- Location: Florina, Greece
- Coordinates: 40.78046665345988°N 21.414229509868193°E
- Type: Art museum
- Founder: Florina Art Centre

The Florina Art Gallery (Greek: Πινακοθήκη Φλωρινιωτών Καλλιτεχνών) located on 4 Antheon Street in Florina, was set up in 1985 by the Florina Art Centre with the aim of collecting, spotlighting, and promoting the artistic output of Florina through the notable work of the local artists, encouraging young people to take an interest in artistic endeavours and pursuits, and inviting scholars to research and study the local artistic tradition.

Its premises are the old railway station building, which the Hellenic Railways Organisation has made over to the Art Centre so that the Gallery can have a permanent home. It stands near the entrance to the town, not far from the Archaeological Museum.

== Exhibits ==
The collection comprises a total of 99 works by 32 local artists: Koulis, Loustas, Gazeas, Tamoutselis, Konstandinidis, Kalamaras, Milossis, Golitsis, Kyrkos, Bessas, Spyrou, Zografos, Lioukras, Rakovalis, Tamoutselis, Papastamatis, Tsoulfidou, Tyrpenos, Tsotsos, Andoniadis, Koras, Vyssios, Vyzandis, Yoftsis, Dotsis, Ioannou, Baras, Papadimitriou, Pavlidis, Sampsonidis, Linaras, and Mihail. The exhibits include paintings, sculptures, drawings, photodrawings, and a hologram, which spotlight the artistic output of Floriniot artists both old and young.

== Gallery ==
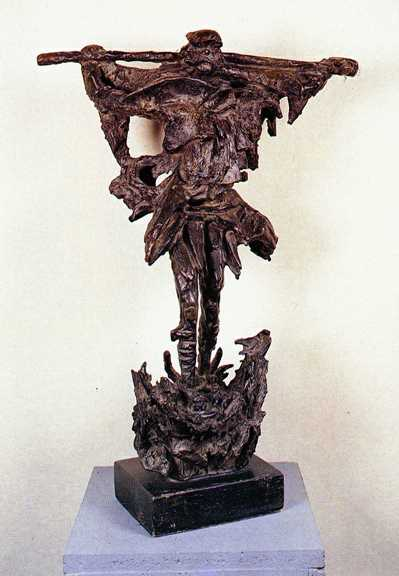
Greek shepherd, sculpture by George Koras

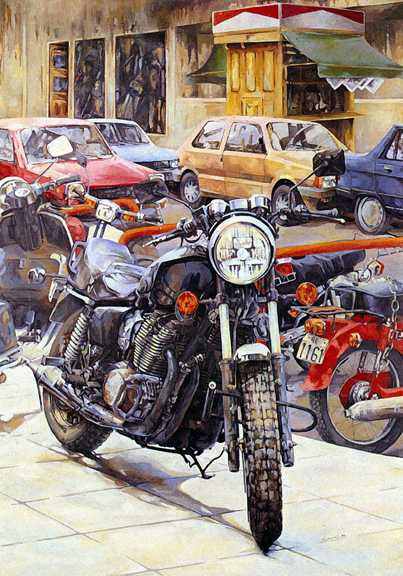
Motorbike, painting by Papastamatis

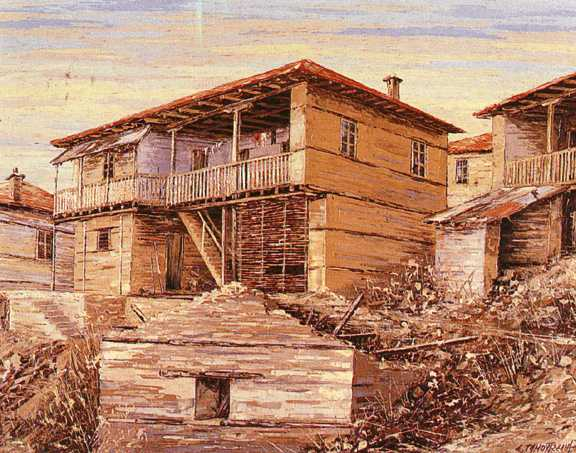
House at Psarades village, drawing by Tamoutselis
