= Grammatikopoulos =

Grammatikopoulos (masculine, Greek: Γραμματικόπουλος) or Grammatikopoulou (feminine, Greek: Γραμματικόπουλου) is a Greek surname, derived from γραμματέας "grammateas", meaning secretary. Notable people with the surname include:

- Achilleas Grammatikopoulos (1908–2008), Greek footballer
- Panagiotis Grammatikopoulos (born 1959), Greek weightlifter
- Serafim Grammatikopoulos (born 1960), Greek weightlifter
- Valentini Grammatikopoulou (born 1997), Greek tennis player
