= List of museums in Greece =

This is a list of museums in Greece by regional unit.

== Attica ==
=== Central Athens ===
Archaeological

- Acropolis Museum
- Archaeological Museum of Kerameikos
- Epigraphical Museum
- Goulandris Museum of Cycladic Art
- Museum of the Ancient Agora
- Museum of the Center for the Acropolis Studies
- National Archaeological Museum of Athens
- Old Acropolis Museum
- Numismatic Museum of Athens,
- Syntagma Metro Station Archaeological Collection
- Museum of Ancient Greek Technology "Kostas Kotsanas" (private museum)

Byzantine, ecclesiastic

- Byzantine and Christian Museum (Athens)

Biographical, city, diachronic, ethnic, ethnographic, history, historic house

- Benaki Museum
- Nea Smyrni Digital Museum
- Eleftherios Venizelos Historical Museum
- Jewish Museum of Greece
- Museum of the City of Athens
- Museum of Pavlos and Alexandra Kanellopoulou
- National Historical Museum of Greece (Old Parliament House)

Folklore, folk art

- Centre for the Study of Traditional Pottery
- Ilias Lalaounis Jewelry Museum
- Museum of Greek Folk Art
- Museum of Greek Folk Musical Instruments
- Museum of the History of the Greek Costume

Art museums and galleries, music, theater, culture, popular art

- Athinais Culture Center
- Bernier–Eliades Gallery Museum
- City of Athens Cultural Center
- Design Museum of the 20th Century
- Frissiras Museum
- Goulandris Museum of Contemporary Art
- Gounaropoulos Museum
- Herakleidon Art Museum
- Maria Callas Museum
- Marika Kotopouli Museum
- Melina Merkouri Cultural Center
- Municipal Gallery of Athens
- Museum of Children's Art in Plaka
- Museum of Engravings and Graphic Arts
- The N. Chatzikiriakos-Gkikas Art Gallery
- National Art Gallery
- National Glyptotheque
- Museum of Modern Greek Culture
- National Museum of Contemporary Art, Athens
- Paxinou-Minotis Museum
- Pieridis Museum of Ancient Cypriot Greek Art & Contemporary Art
- Technopolis (Gazi)
- Theatrical Museum of Greece

Industry, maritime, military, mill, railway, science, technology

- Athens War Museum
- Evgenidio Foundation
- Hellenic Air Force Museum
- Hellenic Motor Museum
- Railway Museum of Athens

Anthropology, natural history, geology, paleontology

- Museum of Anthropology, University of Athens
- Museum of Criminology
- Museum of Geology and Paleontology of the Athens University
- Zoological Museum of the University of Athens

Children, education, special interests, sports, university

- Athens Olympic Museum
- Athens University Museum
- Hellenic Children's Museum
- Museum of Greek Children's Art (M.G.C.A.)
- Mini-Greece Museum
- Postal & Philatelic Museum of Greece

=== North Athens ===
- Deste Foundation (exhibition area)
- Drossinis Museum
- Gaia Center
- Goulandris Natural History Museum
- OTE Museum of Telecommunications, Kifisia
- Spathario Museum
- Yiannis Tsarouchis Foundation Museum

=== South Athens ===
- Evgenidio Foundation (planetarium and science museum)
- Greek cruiser Georgios Averof
- Tactual Museum of Athens

=== Piraeus regional unit ===
Archaeological

- Archaeological Museum of Piraeus

Art museums and galleries, theater

- Municipal Art Gallery of Piraeus
- Panos Aravantinos Decor Museum

Maritime, railway

- Electric Railways Museum of Piraeus
- Hellenic Maritime Museum

=== Islands regional unit ===
- Archaeological Museum of Aegina
- Archaeological Museum of Kythera
- Archaeological Museum of Poros
- Pavlos Kountouriotis Mansion, Hydra
- Spetses Museum

=== West Attica ===
Archaeological

- Archaeological Museum of Eleusis
- Archaeological Museum of Megara

Art museums and galleries

- Skironio Museum Polychronopoulos

=== East Attica ===
Archaeological

- Archaeological Museum of Acharnes (part of Folk Art Museum of Acharnes)
- Archaeological Museum of Brauron
- Archaeological Museum of Lavrion
- Archaeological Museum of Marathon
- Athens International Airport Archaeological Collection
- Archaeological Museum of Schimatari

Folklore, folk art

- Folk Art Museum of Acharnes
- Vorres Museum, Paiania
- Zygomalas Museum, Avlonas

Technology, geology

- Phaethon Technological Museum (car museum, electronics, watches, spy gear, medical devices), Kalamos
- Mineralogical Museum of Lavrion

== Central Macedonia ==
=== Thessaloniki regional unit ===
Archaeological

- Archaeological Museum of Thessaloniki
- Museum of Roman Forum

Byzantine, ecclesiastic

- Crypt of Agios Demetrios
- Museum of Byzantine Culture
- White Tower of Thessaloniki

Biographical, city, diachronic, ethnic, ethnographic, history, historic house, natural history

- Atatürk Museum
- Historical Museum of the Balkan Wars
- Holocaust Museum of Greece (under construction)
- Jewish Museum of Thessaloniki
- Museum of the Macedonian Struggle
- Natural History Museum

Folklore, folk art

- Folk Art and Ethnological Museum of Macedonia and Thrace

Art museums and galleries, music, theater, culture, popular art

- Art Gallery of the Society of Macedonian Studies
- Cinema Museum of Thessaloniki
- Macedonian Museum of Contemporary Art
- Museum of Photography Thessaloniki
- National Bank Museum of the Cultural Center of Northern Greece

Industry, maritime, military, mill, railway, science, technology

- National Map Library
- Railway Museum of Thessaloniki
- Science Center and Technology Museum "Noesis"
- War Museum of Thessaloniki
- Water Supply Museum, Thessaloniki

Children, education, special interests, sports, university

- Museum of Plaster Casts of the Aristotle University of Thessaloniki
- Thessaloniki Olympic Museum (former sports museum)

=== Imathia regional unit ===
Agricultural

- Wine and Vine Museum

Archaeological

- Archaeological Museum of Veroia
- Museum of the Royal Tombs of Aiga
- Vergina (building for the protection of the royal tombs > see section)

Byzantine, ecclesiastic

- Byzantine Museum of Veroia

Folklore

- Folklore Museum of the Lyceum of Hellenic Women
- Folklore Museum of Veroia

=== Kilkis regional unit ===
Archaeological

- Archaeological Museum of Kilkis

History, war

- Kilkis War Museum
- Museum of the Battle of Lahanas

Folklore

- Macedonian Folklore Museum

=== Serres regional unit ===
Archaeological

- Archaeological Museum of Amphipolis
- Archaeological Museum (Serres)

Byzantine, ecclesiastic

- Ecclesiastical Museum of the Holy Bishopry of Serres and Nigrita
- Museum of the Old Cathedral at Serres

Folklore

- Mihalis Tsartsidis Folklore and History Museum (Sidirokastro)
- Sarakatsani Folklore Museum

=== Chalkidiki regional unit ===
Archaeological

- Archaeological Museum of Polygyros

Byzantine, ecclesiastic

- Tower of Ouranoupolis

Folklore

- Folklore Museum (Polygyros)
- History and Folklore Museum (Arnaia)

=== Pella regional unit ===
Archaeological

- Archaeological Museum of Pella

Ecclesiastical

- Ecclesiastical Museum (Edessa)

Folklore

- Folklore Museum (Edessa)
- Folklore Museum (Yannitsa)
- Nature and Folklore Museum of Loutra Almopias

=== Pieria regional unit ===
Archaeological

- Archaeological Museum of Dion (Dion)
- Visitable Museum Store in Makrygialos (Makrygialos)

Geological

- Olympus Geological History Museum (Leptokarya)

Folklore

- Folklore Museum of Katerini (Katerini)
- Pieria Asia Minor Society Museum (Katerini)

Maritime

- Maritime Museum of Litochoro (Litochoro)

Ecclesiastical

- Ecclesiastical Museum of Metropolis of Kitros, Katerini and Platamon (Katerini)

== Eastern Macedonia and Thrace ==
=== Rhodope regional unit ===
Archaeological

- Archaeological Museum of Komotini

Byzantine, ecclesiastic

- Byzantine Museum of Komotini
- Ecclesiastical Museum of the Holy Bishopry of Maroneia and Komotini

Folklore, folk art

- Basketry Museum of the Roma
- Folklore Museum of Komotini

=== Kavala ===
Archaeological

- Archaeological Museum of Kavala
- Archaeological Museum of Philippi

Folklore, folk art

- Cultural House of Nea Karvali

Industry, maritime, military, mill, railway, science, technology

- Maritime Museum of Kavala
- Historical and Ethnographical Museum of the Cappadocian Greeks
- Olive and Oil Museum
- Tobacco Museum

=== Thasos ===
- Archaeological Museum of Thasos

=== Evros regional unit ===
Archaeological

- Archaeological Museum of Samothrace

Byzantine, ecclesiastic

- Alexandroupolis Ecclesiastical Museum

Ethnographic, history

- Ethnological Museum of Thrace

Industrial, technology

- Art of the Silk Museum, Soufli

=== Xanthi regional unit ===
Archaeological

- Archaeological Museum of Abdera

=== Drama regional unit ===
Archaeological

- Archaeological Museum of Drama

History

- Natural History Museum (Paranesti)
- Drama Train Museum
- Drama Museum of Photographic Cameras

Folklore

- Folklore Museum

== Western Macedonia ==
=== Kozani regional unit ===
Archaeological

- Aiani Archaeological Museum
- Archaeological Museum of Kozani

Byzantine, ecclesiastic

- Ecclesiastical Museum of Siatista

Ethnographic, history, folklore, folk art

- Anthropological and Folklore Museum (Ptolemaida)
- Historical - Folklore and Natural History Museum of Kozani
- Museum of Modern Local History of Kozani

Natural history, geology, paleontology

- Paleontological and Historical Museum of Ptolemais
- Paleontological Museum of Siatista

=== Kastoria regional unit ===
Archaeological

- Dispilio Lakeside Neolithic Settlement Archaeological Collection

Architectural

- Monuments Museum

Byzantine, ecclesiastic

- Byzantine Museum of Kastoria

Folklore, folk art

- Costume Museum
- Folklore Museum of Kastoria

=== Florina regional unit ===
Archaeological

- Archaeological Museum of Florina

Art museums and galleries

- The Florina Art Gallery
- Florina Museum of Modern Art

Folklore

- Folklore Museum of the Aristotle Association
- Folklore Museum of the Culture Club
- Museum of Folklore and History (Drosopigi)

=== Grevena regional unit ===
History

- Grevena Municipal Museum

== Epirus ==
=== Ioannina regional unit ===
Archaeological

- Archaeological Museum of Ioannina

Byzantine, ecclesiastic

- Byzantine Museum of Ioannina

Ethnographic, history, war

- 1912–1913 War Museum
- Athanasios Vrellis Museum of Wax Effigies (in town)
- Ethnographic Museum of the Ioannina University
- Ethnographic Museum of Pyrsoghianni
- Historical Museum of Ioannina
- Museum of National Resistance
- Municipal Ethnographic Museum of Ioannina
- Pavlos Vrellis Greek History Museum
- War Museum of Kalpaki

Folklore, folk art

- Folk Art Museum of Epirus - "Kostas Frontzos"
- Museum of the Foundation for the Epirotic Studies

Art museums and galleries

- Averoff Gallery (Metsovo)
- Municipal Art Gallery of Ioannina

=== Arta regional unit ===
Archaeological

- Archaeological Collection of Arta

Folklore, folk art

- Arta Folklore Museum of "Skoufas" Association

=== Preveza regional unit ===
Archaeological

- Archaeological Museum of Nikopolis in Preveza City

=== Thesprotia ===
Archaeological

- Archaeological Museum of Igoumenitsa

== Thessaly ==
=== Magnesia ===
Archaeological

- Archaeological Museum of Almyros
- Archaeological Museum of Volos

Byzantine, ecclesiastic

- Ecclesiastic Museum of Aghia Marina

Biographical, ethnographic, history

- Hellenic Museum of Zagora

Folklore, folk art

- Kitsos Makris Folklore Museum
- Museum of Folk Art and History of Pelion
- Theofilos Museum of Anakasia

Art museums and galleries

- Alexander K.Damtsas Museum
- Municipal Art Gallery of Volos

Industry, railway, technology

- Thessaly Railway Museum
- Rooftile and Brickworks Museum N. & S. Tsalapatas (Tsalapatas National Museum of Industrial History)

Natural history

- Athanasios Koutroumbas Insect Museum, in Volos

=== Sporades ===
- Alonissos Museum
- Folklore Museum of Skopelos
- Papadiamantis House Museum of Skiathos
- Photographic Center of Skopelos
- Zisis Oikonomou Museum

=== Larissa regional unit ===
Diachronic

- Diachronic Museum of Larissa

Ethnographic, historical, folklore, folk art, ecclesiastical

- Folklore and Historical Museum of Ambelakia
- Folklore and Historical Museum of Larissa
- Folklore Museum of Dolichi
- Folklore Museum of Gonnoi
- Folklore Museum of Livadi – G. Olympios Mansion
- Folklore Museum of Verdikousia
- G. Schwartz Mansion of Ambelakia
- Hatzigogos Inn Historical Museum of Sarantaporo
- Museum of Thessalic Life, of the Syrmakezis family, Elateia, Larissa
- Wine Museum of Rapsani
- Wine Museum of Tyrnavos

Art museums and galleries

- Municipal Art Gallery – G.I Katsigra Museum of Larissa

Military, science, biographical, education

- Larissa Museum of National Resistance of Thessaly
- School Museum of Primary Education, Farsala

== Central Greece ==
=== Phthiotis ===
Archaeological

- Archaeological Collection of Elateia
- Archaeological Museum of Atalanti
- Archaeological Museum of Lamia

Byzantine, ecclesiastic

- Byzantine Museum of Phthiotida

=== Phocis ===
Archaeological

- Amfissa Archaeological Museum
- Archaeological Collection of Lidoriki
- Delphi Archaeological Museum
- Galaxidi Archaeological Collection

=== Euboea regional unit ===
Archaeological

- Archaeological Museum of Chalkis
- Archaeological Museum of Eretria
- Archaeological Museum of Karystos
- Archaeological Museum of Skyros

Folklore, folk art

- Folklore Museum of Kymi
- Manos Faltaits Museum (Skyros)

=== Boeotia ===
Archaeological

- Archaeological Museum of Chaironeia
- Archaeological Museum of Thebes
- Distomo Archaeological Collection
- Schimatari Museum

== Ionian Islands ==
=== Corfu regional unit ===
Archaeological

- Archaeological Museum of Corfu
- Archaeological Museum of Paleopolis

Byzantine, ecclesiastic

- Byzantine Museum of Antivouniotissa

Biographical, ethnic, history

- Kapodistrias Museum
- Serbian Museum of Corfu
- Solomos Museum

Art museums and galleries

- Museum of Asian Art of Corfu
- Municipal Gallery of Corfu

Music

- The Music Museum 'Nikolaos Halikiopoulos Mantzaros' of the Philharmonic Society of Corfu

Numismatic

- Banknote Museum

=== Zakynthos ===
Byzantine, ecclesiastic

- Byzantine Museum of Zakynthos

Biographical, history

- Museum of Dionysios Solomos and Eminent Zakynthians
- Museum of Grigorios Xenopoulos

=== Cephalonia ===
Archaeological

- Archaeological Collection of Stavros
- Archaeological Museum of Argostoli

Folklore, folk art

- Korgialeneio Historical and Folklore Museum

Natural history

- Museum of Natural History of Cephalonia and Ithaca

Byzantine, ecclesiastic

- St. Andrew Convent - The Ecclesiastical Museum

Maritime

- Maritime Museum of the Ionian Sea
- Nautical and Environmental Museum of Fiscardo

=== Ithaca ===
- Archaeological Museum of Vathy

=== Lefkada regional unit ===
Archaeological

- Archaeological Museum of Lefkada

== West Greece ==
=== Achaea ===
Archaeological

- Archaeological Museum of Aigion
- Archaeological Museum of Patras
- Fissini Street Archeological Collection (Patras)

Ethnographic, history

- Historical Museum of the Aghia Lavra Monastery
- Museum of the Sacrifice of the People of Kalavryta

Folklore, folk art

- Folk Art Museum of Patras

Art museums and galleries, popular art

- Popular Art Museum of Chalandritsa

Natural history

- Zoological Museum of the Patras University

Science and technology

- Museum of Science & Technology of the University of Patras

=== Aetolia-Acarnania ===
Archaeological

- Archaeological Museum of Agrinion
- Archaeological Museum of Thyrreion

Ethnographic, folklore, history

- Aitoloakarnania Folklore Museum
- Ethnographic Museum of Kaletzi
- Ethnographic Museum of Lefkasio
- Museum of the History of the Holy City of Mesolongi

=== Elis ===
Archaeological

- Archaeological Museum of Elis
- Archaeological Museum of Olympia

Sports

- Museum of the Modern Olympic Games

Technology

- Museum of Ancient Greek Technology (Ilia)

== Peloponnese ==
=== Argolis ===
Archaeological

- Archaeological Museum of Argos
- Archaeological Museum of Epidaurus
- Archaeological Museum of Mycenae
- Archaeological Museum of Nafplion
- Archaeological Museum of Nemea

Byzantine, ecclesiastic

- Byzantine Museum of Argolis

Folklore, folk art

- Komboloi Museum
- Laskarideio Folklore Museum

=== Messenia ===
Archaeological

- Archaeological Museum of Chora
- Archaeological Museum of Messenia
- Benakeion Archaeological Museum of Kalamata (now defunct, see Archaeological Museum of Messenia)
- Museum of Ancient Messene

=== Arcadia ===
Archaeological

- Archaeological Museum of Astros
- Archaeological Museum of Lykosoura
- Archaeological Museum of Tegea

Open-air

- Dimitsana Open-air Water Power Museum

=== Corinthia ===
Archaeological

- Archaeological Museum of Ancient Corinth
- Archaeological Museum of Isthmia

Ethnographic, folklore, historical

- Historical and Folklore Museum of Corinth
- Environment Museum of Stymphalia

=== Laconia ===
Archaeological

- Archaeological Museum of Sparta
- Monemvasia Archaeological Collection

Byzantine, ecclesiastic

- Archaeological Museum of Mystras

== North Aegean ==
=== Chios regional unit ===
Archaeological

- Archaeological Museum of Chios

Byzantine, ecclesiastic

- Chios Byzantine Museum
- Museum of Nea Moni at Chios

Maritime

- Chios Maritime Museum

=== Lesbos ===
Archaeological

- Archaeological – Folklore Collection of Napi
- Archaeological Museum of Mytilene

Geology, natural history, paleontology

- Natural History Museum of the Lesvos Petrified Forest

Ouzo

- Ouzo Museum – The World of Ouzo

=== Lemnos regional unit ===
- Archaeological Museum of Lemnos

=== Ikaria regional unit ===
- Archaeological Collection of Agios Kirykos

=== Samos ===
Archaeological

- Archaeological Museum of Samos
- Kambos Archaeological Museum
- The Paleontological Museum of Mytilinioi (Samos)

== South Aegean ==
=== Andros ===
- Andros Maritime Museum
- Andros Museum of Modern Art
- Archaeological Museum of Andros
- Archaeological Museum of Palaiopolis

=== Kalymnos regional unit ===
- Archaeological Museum of Astypalaia
- Archaeological Museum of Kalymnos
- Vouvalis Mansion (Kalymnos)

=== Karpathos regional unit ===
- Archaeological Museum of Karpathos (future)

=== Kea-Kythnos ===
- Archaeological Museum of Kea

=== Kos regional unit ===
- Archaeological Museum of Kos
- Archaeological Museum of Nisyros

=== Milos regional unit ===
Archaeological

- Archaeological Collection of Agios Andreas on Sifnos
- Archaeological Collection of Serifos
- Archaeological Museum of Kimolos
- Archaeological Museum of Milos
- Archaeological Museum of Sifnos

Byzantine, ecclesiastic

- Ecclesiastical Museum in Adamas (Milos)

Other

- Milos Mining Museum (Adamas on Milos)

=== Mykonos ===
- Aegean Maritime Museum (Mykonos)
- Archaeological Museum of Delos
- Archaeological Museum of Mykonos
- Mykonos Folklore Museum

=== Naxos regional unit ===
Archaeological

- Archaeological Collection of Amorgos
- Archaeological Museum of Apeiranthos
- Archaeological Museum of Gyroulas at Sangri
- Archaeological Museum of Naxos

Byzantine, ecclesiastic

- Byzantine Museum of Naxos

Other

- Apiranthos Natural History Museum
- Venetian Museum (Della Rocca Barozzi at Naxos)

=== Paros regional unit ===
- Archaeological Museum of Paros

=== Rhodes regional unit ===
- Aquarium of Rhodes
- Archaeological Museum of Rhodes
- Bee Museum of Rhodes
- Decorative Arts Collection, Rhodes
- Kastellorizo Archaeological Museum
- Kastellorizo Folk Art Museum
- Palace of the Grand Masters
- MGA Museum - Museum of Modern Greek Art of Rhodes
- Museum of Mineralogy & Paleontology Stamatiadis, Rhodes

=== Syros ===
- Archaeological Museum of Syros

=== Thira regional unit ===
- Archaeological Collection of Anafi
- Archaeological Museum of Ios
- Archaeological Museum of Thera
- Folegandros Folklore Museum
- Museum of Prehistoric Thira

=== Tinos ===
- Archaeological Museum of Tinos

== Crete ==
=== Chania regional unit ===
Archaeological

- Archaeological Museum of Chania
- Archaeological Museum of Kissamos

Byzantine, ecclesiastic

- Byzantine and Post-Byzantine Collection of Chania
- Museum of the Monastery of Agia Triada Tsangarolon
- Museum of the Monastery of Chryssopighi
- Museum of the Monastery of Gonia

Biographical, ethnographic, history

- Eleftherios Venizelos Museum of Chalepa

Historical, folklore

- Historical and Folklore Museum of Gavalochori

Maritime, war

- Maritime Museum of Crete

Children, education

- School Life Museum

=== Heraklion regional unit ===
Archaeological

- Archaeological Museum of Messara
- Heraklion Archaeological Museum

Byzantine, ecclesiastic

- Collection of Agia Aikaterini of Sinai
- Collection of Agios Matthaios of Sinai

Biographical, ethnographic, history, war

- Historical Museum of Crete
- Museum of the Battle of Crete
- Museum of Cretan Ethnology
- Nikos Kazantzakis Museum

Art museums and galleries

- Museum of Visual Arts

Science

- Video Games Museum

Natural history

- Aquaworld Aquarium
- Natural History Museum of Crete

=== Rethymno regional unit ===
Archaeological

- Archaeological Museum of Rethymno
- Museum of Ancient Eleutherna

Byzantine, ecclesiastic

- Museum of the Monastery of Arkadi
- Museum of the Monastery of Preveli

Ethnographic, folklore, historical

- Historical and Folklore Museum of Rethymno

Folklore, folk art

- The Frantzeskaki Collection

Art museums and galleries

- Municipal Gallery "L.Kanakakis"

Natural history

- Museum of Sea Life at Rethymno
- Paleolithic Museum of Rethymno

=== Lasithi (regional unit) ===
Archaeological

- Archaeological Collection of Neapolis
- Archaeological Museum of Agios Nikolaos
- Archaeological Museum of Sitia

== See also ==
- List of Foreign Archaeological Institutes in Greece
