= Waterworks Museum =

Waterworks Museum may refer to:

- Metropolitan Waterworks Museum in Boston, Massachusetts
- Waterworks Museum (Cape Town), in South Africa
- Water Supply Museum, in Thessaloniki, Greece
- Louisville WaterWorks Museum, in Kentucky
