= Kastellorizo Folk Art Museum =

Museum in Kastellorizo, Greece

Kavos Mosque
- Τζαμί του Κάβου
- Location of the former mosque, now museum in Greece

Religion
- Affiliation: Islam (former)
- Ecclesiastical or organizational status: Mosque (1775–1910s)
- Status: Abandoned (as a mosque); Repurposed (as a museum)

Location
- Location: Kastellorizo, South Aegean
- Country: Greece
- Interactive map of Kavos Mosque
- Coordinates: 36°09′06″N 29°35′35″E

Architecture
- Type: Mosque
- Style: Ottoman
- Completed: 1775

Specifications
- Dome: 1
- Minaret: 1
- Kastellorizo Folk Art Museum
- Μουσείο Λαϊκής Τέχνης Καστελλόριζου
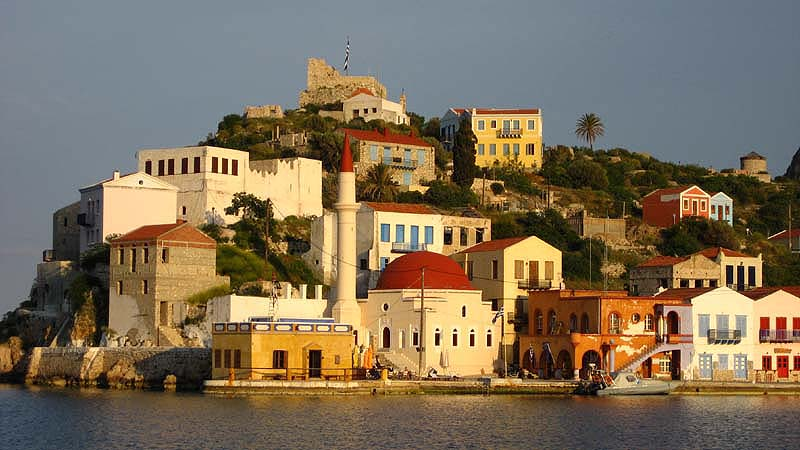
- The red-domed museum (center) in the port of Kastellorizo
- Established: July 2007
- Location: Kastellorizo
- Type: History museum
- Collections: Historic Collection of Kastellorizo

The Kastellorizo Folk Art Museum (Greek: Μουσείο Λαϊκής Τέχνης Καστελλόριζου), also known as the Ottoman Mosque Museum, is a history museum in the small island of Kastellorizo, in the South Aegean region of Greece. Built in 1775, during the Ottoman era, as a mosque, known as the Kavos Mosque (Greek: Τζαμί του Κάβου, lit. 'Mosque of the Peninsula'), or simply the Kastellorizo Mosque (Greek: Τζαμί του Καστελλόριζου, Turkish: Meis Camii), the mosque was abandoned during the 1910s. The structure was repurposed as a museum in 2007.

== Description ==
Located on the tip of the small peninsula that forms the neighbourhood of Kavos, the island's only mosque, coloured in beige and red colors, was erected on the site of a previous Christian church dedicated to Saint Paraskevi. It was built in 1775.

Since July 2007, the structure housed the Historic Collection of Kastellorizo, mostly consisting of photographs, pictures, and documents recording the history of Kastellorizo from the 19th century until its destruction in 1943 during World War II and 1948, when the island along with the rest of the Dodecanese archipelago joined the rest of Greece, following a brief period under Italian rule.

== See also ==
- Islam in Greece
- List of former mosques in Greece
- List of museums in Greece
- Chios Byzantine Museum
- Ottoman Greece
