= Athanasios Koutroumbas Insect Museum =

Museum in Volos, Magnesia, Greece

- Εντομολογικό Μουσείο Βόλου
- Location: Zachou 98 (at Sikelianou), Volos, Magnesia, Greece
- Coordinates: 39.37420°N 22.94613°E
- Founder: Athanasios Koutroumbas

Athanasios Koutroumbas Insect Museum, also known as the Entomological Museum, is a museum in Volos, Magnesia, Greece.

It includes more than 100,000 specimens of more than 35,000 species, subspecies and breeds.

The greatest number is Lepidoptera. One of its rare or unique specimens is one of the largest moths in the world, Thysania agrippina, of North America with a wingspan of 37-40 cm. Note, however, that the largest known specimen of Thysania agrippina, as of March 2000 according to one source, was one of almost 30 cm (12 in) wingspan, in Brazil.

It is claimed to be the only museum "of its kind in Greece and one of the best in the Balkans".

== See also ==
- List of museums in Greece
