= Hellenic Motor Museum =

Car museum in Athens

Coordinates: 37°59′29″N 23°43′48″E

The museum façade.

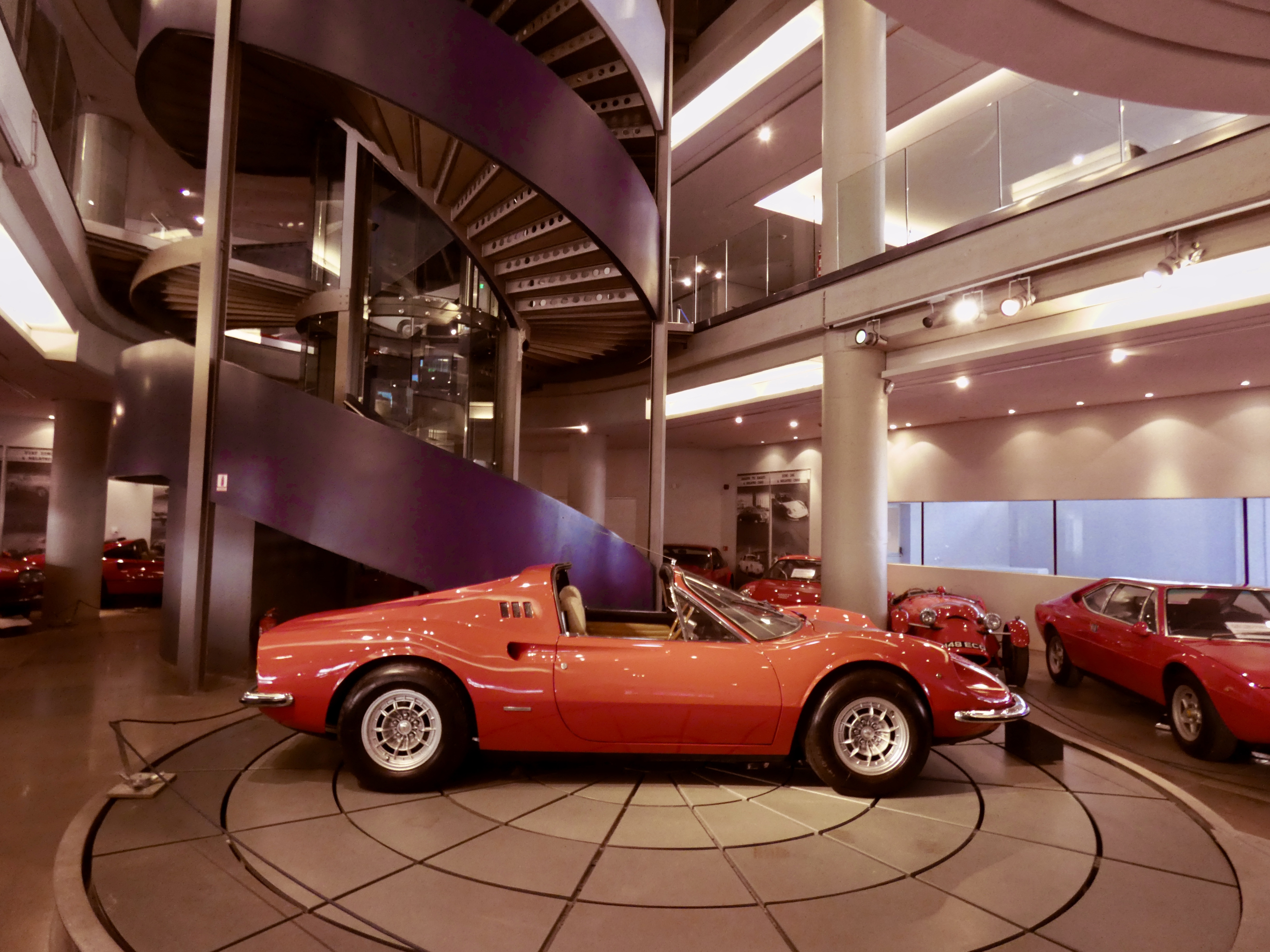
Interior.

The Hellenic Motor Museum (Greek: Ελληνικό Μουσείο Αυτοκινήτου) is a car museum in Athens. It is owned by the Theodore Charagionis Foundation and opened in March 2011 (15 years ago). The museum is situated in central Athens near the National Archaeological Museum, on the three top floors of the Athenian Capitol shopping mall.

The collection of the museum consists of 300 cars of which about 110 are displayed periodically. The museum offers many other facilities such as a Formula 1 simulator, a road safety educational programme and an amphitheatre.

== See also ==
- List of museums in Greece
