= Eleftherios Venizelos Foundation =

Greek foundation

Eleftherios Venizelos Foundation is a national research foundation in Chania, Crete, founded on 26 March 2000. It is a center for research and study of the work and the era of Eleftherios Venizelos. Its activities include organizing events, conferences, education, research, awards, grants, exhibitions, collaborations and publications. The Foundation premises are located in the residence of Eleftherios Venizelos in Halepa square, Chania.
