= Tactual Museum of Athens =

Museum in Greece

Coordinates: 37°56′44″N 23°42′00″E

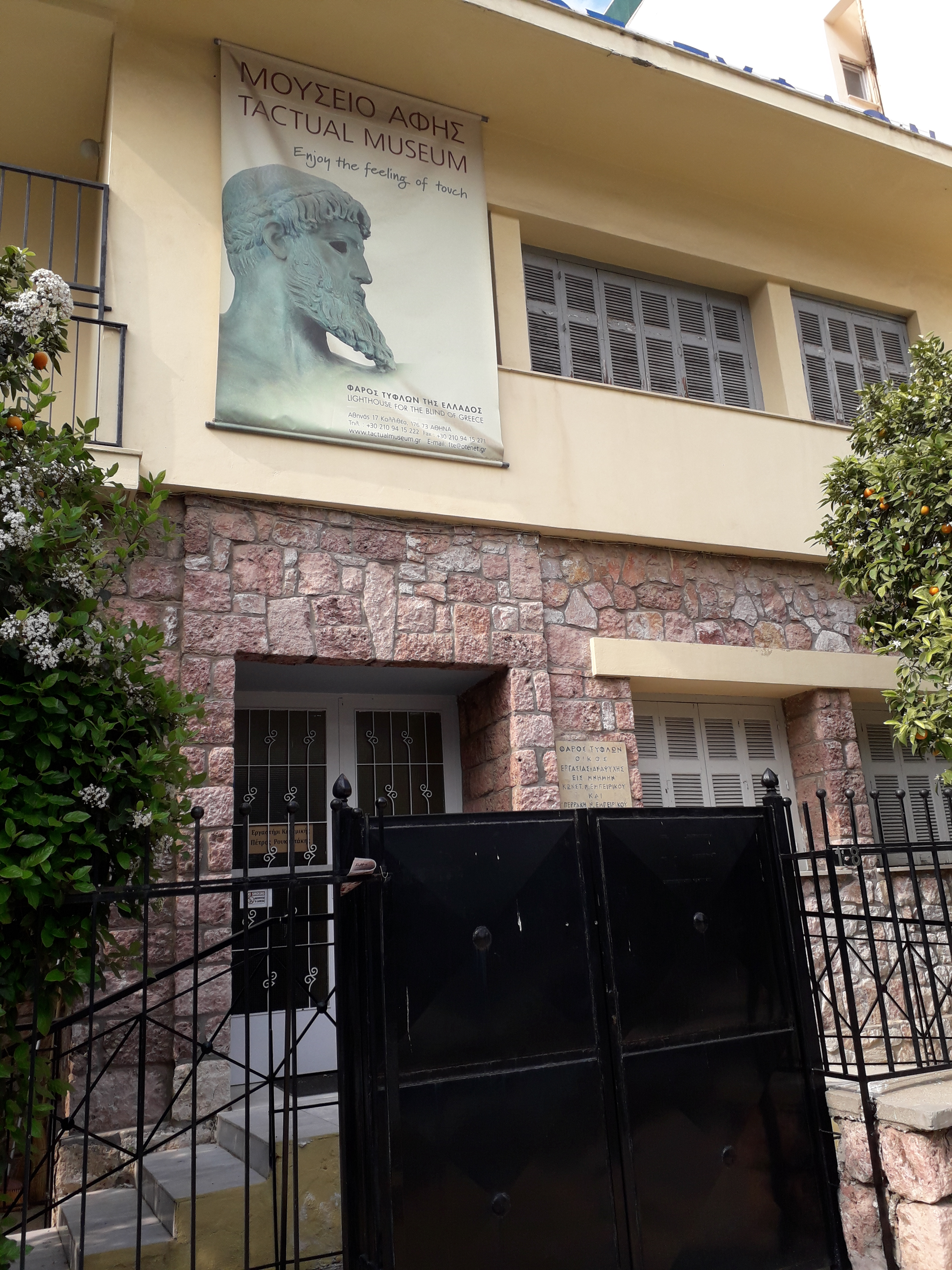

The Tactual Museum of Athens is a museum for the visually impaired in Kallithea, Athens, Greece. It was founded in 1984 by the Kallithea-based association Lighthouse for the Blind of Greece to allow visually impaired people to become familiarised with the cultural heritage of Greece.

The museum exhibits copies of original artifacts displayed in other Greek museums that may be touched by all visitors. These include exhibits of the Mycenaean, Geometric, Archaic, Classical, Hellenistic and Roman periods. There are also exhibits from the Byzantine era and works of art from visually impaired people.

The museum is open on weekdays from 08:00 to 16:00, and on weekends after making the necessary arrangements with the museum's management.

== See also ==
- List of museums in Greece
