= Pieridis Museum =

Museum in Athens, Greece

Coordinates: 37°59′0.4″N 23°42′39.4″E

Pieridis Museum is a museum in Athens, Greece. Its collection includes items dating back almost nine thousand years, from the Neolithic period to the Middle Ages. They are a part of the archaeological collection of the Pierides Museum in Larnaca, Cyprus. It is situated in the Athinais Culture Center in Votanikos, about 2 km west of downtown Athens.
