= Museum of Criminology (Athens) =

Museum in Athens, Greece

Coordinates: 37.9840°N 23.7669°E

The Museum of Criminology is a university exhibition space belonging to the National and Kapodistrian University of Athens . The museum records the history of crime in Greece during the 19th and 20th centuries. The museum's main target audience is students related to the Faculty of Medicine, in order to obtain information.

== History ==
The Museum of Criminology was founded in 1932 in accordance with the provisions of Law 5343/1932 (Government Gazette 86/Α΄), Article 297 "On the Organization of the University of Athens".

Its founder was Professor of Forensics Ioannis Georgiadis (1874-1960), who had in his possession various objects with which crimes were committed. Then his successors took over the work with the help of the Police and the Greek Army who enriched the museum with a lot of material. Before World War II, the Museum was housed in a room on Sokratous Street, near Omonoia Square. Later, it was moved to the building on Akadimias and Massalias street, where today the "Kostis Palamas" mortuary of the University of Athens is housed and where it remained for about half a century. In 1974 the Forensic and Toxicology Laboratory was moved to the building of the Forensic and Toxicology Laboratory in the Goudi area and with it the Museum was also moved to a specific area where the exhibits are kept. In 1977, the then director of the Forensic and Toxicology Laboratory, Antonios Koutselinis, personally undertook the preservation, re-exhibition and expansion of the forensic collection. In 1992, the Criminal Museum reopened on the first floor of the Laboratory, after the construction of an addition to the existing building.

== Accessibility ==
The museum was founded and is maintained for the educational purposes of both the students of the medical department of the National and Kapodistrian University of Athens and other scientific branches active in medicine and criminology.

Therefore, access to the public, due to the nature of the exhibits, is only possible after consultation with the museum management.

The purposes of the museum include recording the history of crime in Greece as well as covering the research work of students through the exhibits, collections and archives.

== Methods of acquisition ==
As the creator of the criminology museum collection, Ioannis Georgiadis was the one who started the whole project by gradually collecting the "objects" of the collection. The acquisition of the exhibits was therefore done by him, having of course the help of other people, who contributed to this effort.

More specifically, from 1912, even before the foundation of the museum, he began to collect items. These were considered by him to be important and interesting, so that they would be preserved and later placed in the exhibition that he would set up for the creation of the Criminology Museum. Thus, Ioannis Georgiadis, as a medical examiner as well as a professor of forensics, had this possibility to gradually collect the exhibits of his collection.

== Maintenance ==
The process of conserving the exhibits begins with their transfer to the Museum site. In this specific case, the exhibits, which are human members, are initially stored in containers filled with oil and coarse salt. After several months, they are transferred into glass jars containing a preservative mixture composed of phenol, alcohol, and traces of formalin. Moreover, human bones and skulls have been subject to either artificial or natural mummification techniques. Other exhibits that have undergone the conservation process are predominantly weapons, such as knives. However, the wax figures displayed in the Museum have not yet undergone preservation.

== See also ==
- List of museums in Greece
