= Gaia Center =

Museum in Kifisia, Athens, Greece

Gaia Centre
- Κέντρο Γαία
- Location: Kifissia, Athens, Greece
- Coordinates: 38.0745°N 23.8143°E
- Type: Natural history museum

Gaia Centre is a part of the Goulandris Natural History Museum, in Kifissia, a northeastern suburb of Athens, Greece. The centre presents the way planet Earth has been functioning for millions of years in its geological evolution to the present, including the interventions of modern people and the major issues of climate change and biodiversity. It includes a dome 5 metres (16 ft) in diameter and of an approximate surface of 40 square metres (430 sq ft).
