= Thessaly Railway Museum =

Railway museum in Greece

Coordinates: 39°21′51.7″N 22°56′12.8″E

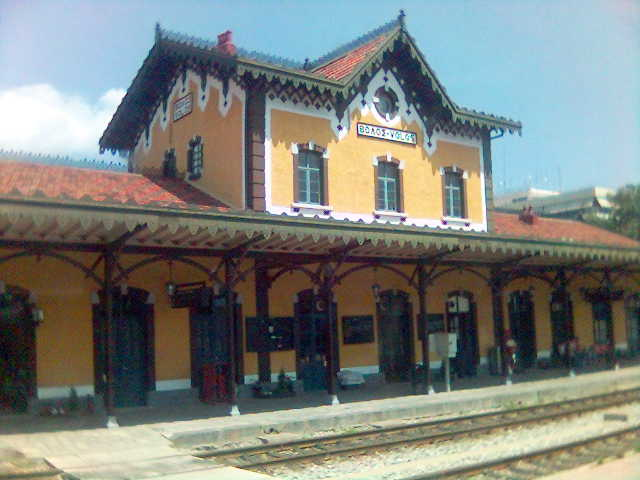
Volos railway station

The Thessaly Railway Museum (or Volos Railway Museum, Greek: Σιδηροδρομικό Μουσείο Θεσσαλίας) was founded in 2006 and occupies the first floor in the beautiful building of Volos railway station in Thessaly, Greece.

The museum exhibits a collection of railway material from the past: rare photographs, uniforms, old telegraphs, machinery for issuing tickets of the 19th century made of wood and bronze, tools, watches, timetables, rolling stock components, traffic lights and old measurement instruments. There is also a documents collection, with rare books concerning railway architecture from the 19th century and other historic documents. The documents collection includes the blueprint drawings of Evaristo De Chirico for the construction of Pelion railway.

A current project involves the construction of an open air rolling stock exhibition at the southwestern area of the station, with the cooperation of University of Thessaly. It shall include 9-10 metre gauge steam locomotives and carriages of the late 19th century, including two coaches for the royal family of Greece.

Currently the museum admits visitors by appointment, Mondays to Fridays 07:30-14:30.

== See also ==
- Thessaly Railways
