= Athens International Airport Archaeological Collection =

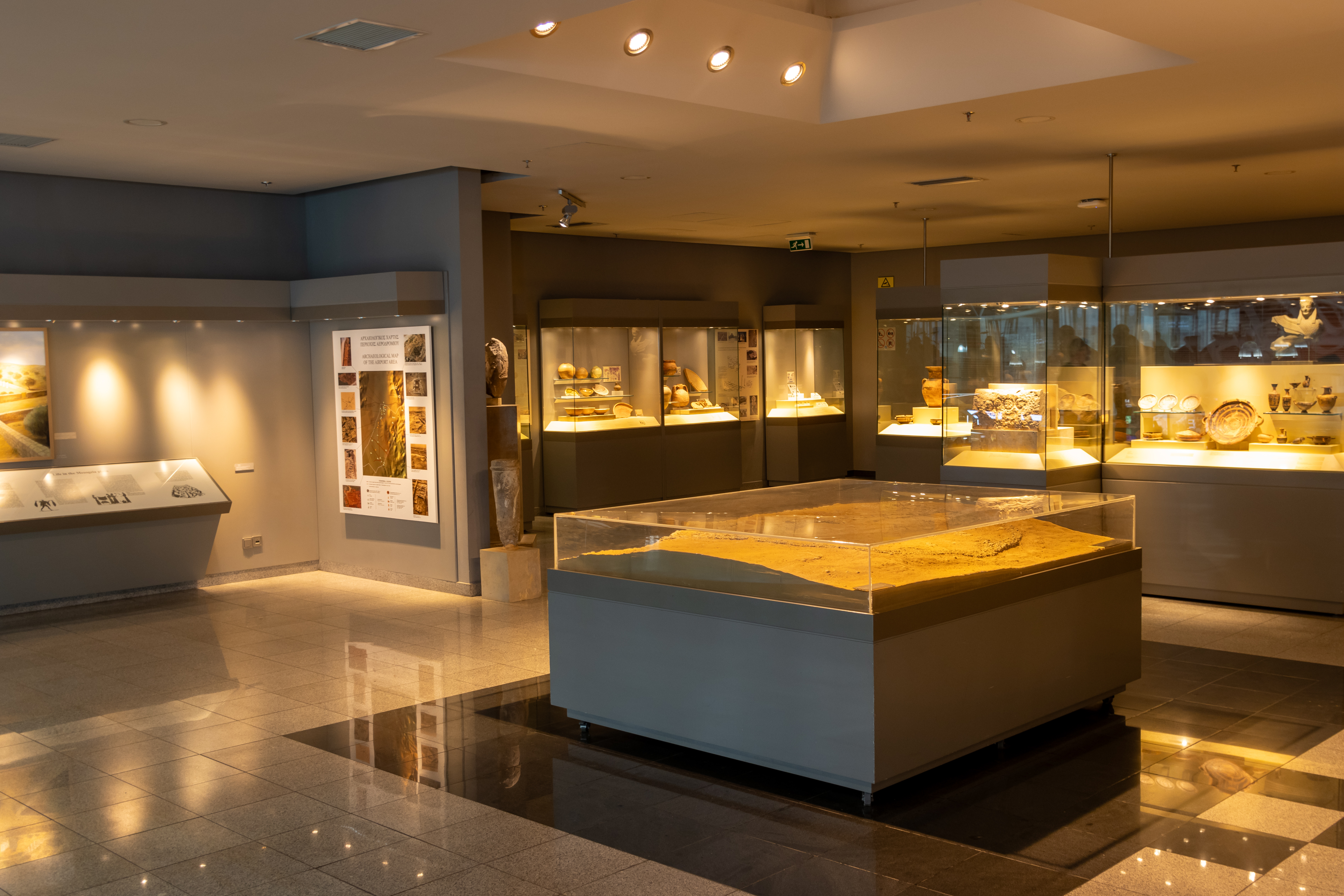
- Established: 2003
- Location: Athens International Airport
- Coordinates: 37.9364°N 23.947°E
- Type: Archaeological
- Public transit access: Airport; Airport
- Website: https://www.aia.gr/traveler/airport-information/art-and-culture/permanent-exhibitions

The Athens International Airport Archaeological Collection is a museum on level 2 outside security in the main terminal building of Athens International Airport in Spata, Attica, Greece.

The collection was established in 2003 and houses 177 ancient artefacts which were uncovered during construction work at the site, once a flourishing agricultural area in ancient times.
