= Serres Ecclesiastical Museum =

Museum in Serres, Greece

Coordinates: 41.0946°N 23.5492°E

The Serres Ecclesiastical Museum (Greek: Εκκλησιαστικό Μουσείο Σερρών "Ψυχής Άκος") occupies the second floor of the Diocesan Headquarters in the town of Serres in northern Greece. It displays a collection of sacerdotal objects which come mainly from the local Monastery of St John the Baptist (Timiou Prodromou) and from churches within the Metropolitanate of Serres and Nigrita.

The exhibits are grouped in four categories: icons, wood-carvings and fragments of chancel screens, metal artifacts, and orphrey, the largest category being the icons, some of which bear the clear hallmarks of the local artistic tradition.

The collection is very important for the history of the religious and artistic life of Serres, Nigrita, and the wider area, because it ably represents artistic trends in, chiefly, post-Byzantine art.

The most important icons are of: the Panagia Hodegetria from the ruined Church of Ano Taxiarhis (14th centuries), Christ the Saviour and the Theotokos Pantanassa from the Church of Agios Georgios Kryoneritis (17th century), Christ the Saviour and the Theotokos Hodegetria from the Church of Agios Antonios in Serres (15th–16th centuries), St Basil (18th century) from the same church, St John the Baptist from the Church of Agios Georgios in Sitohori (16th century), the Theotokos Hodegetria (16th century), the principal icons (including Christ Giving a Blessing) from the chancel screen of the Monastery of St John the Baptist. One outstanding 19th-century icon depicts St Spyridon with John, the second founder of the Monastery of St John the Baptist.

Of interest are the wood-carved fragments of chancel screens, such as one dating to the 18th century from the Church of Agios Georgios in Nigrita and another dating to the 19th century from Agios Nikolaos in Elaionas. There are also a collection of antimensia (the oldest dating to 1653), printed Gospels (1542 and 1614), a pair of gold-embroidered crosses and strips of fabric from a chasuble, and a pair of maniples (1706).

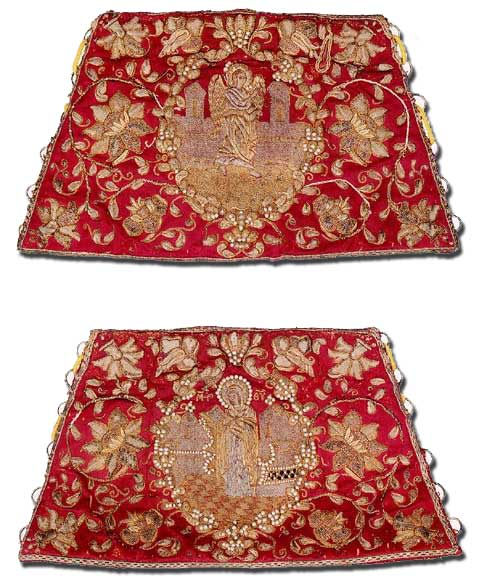
A pair of gold-embroidered crosses (18th century)

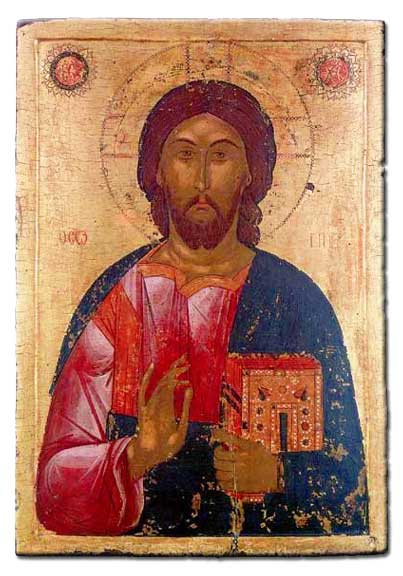
Portable icon of Christ the Saviour, from the Church of Agios Antonios in Serres (15-16th centuries)

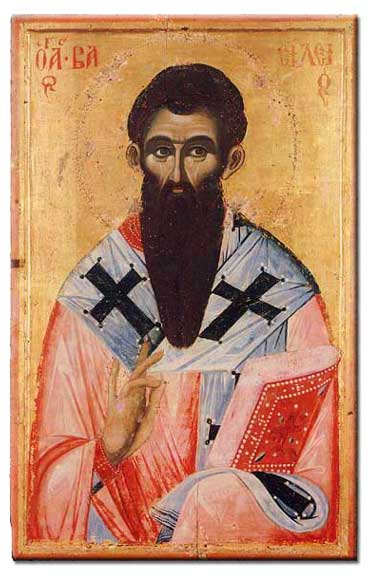
Portable icon of St Basil (18th century) from the Church of Agios Antonios in Serres

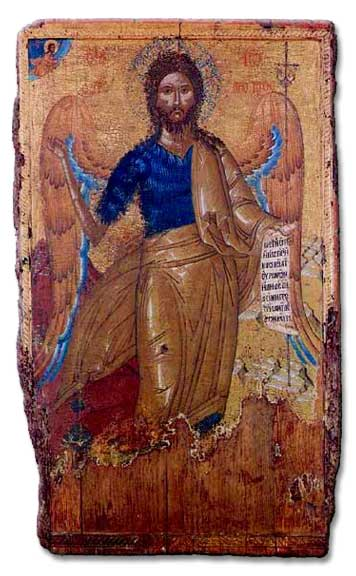
Portable icon of St John the Baptist from the Church of Agios Georgios in Sitohori (16th century)

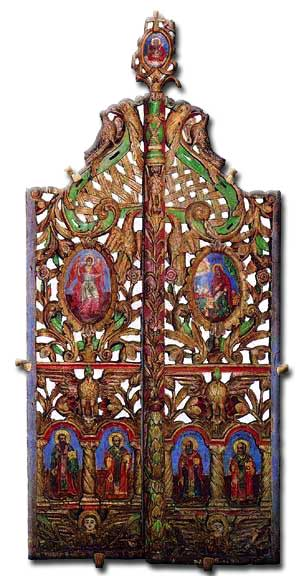
Bema doors (19th century) from Holy Church of Agios Nikolaos at Eleousa

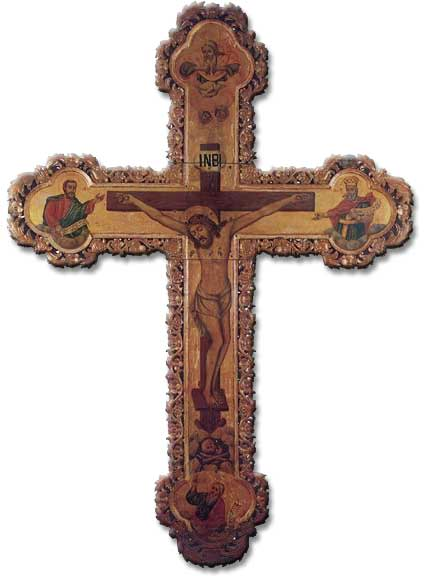
Wood-carved Holy Cross (18th-19th centuries)

== Sources ==
- This article incorporates text from the corresponding article at the Museums of Macedonia website, commissioned by the Macedonian Heritage foundation, written by Vlasis Vlasidis, and published under a CC-BY-SA-3.0 license.
