= Hellenic Children's Museum =

- Ελληνικό Παιδικό Μουσείο

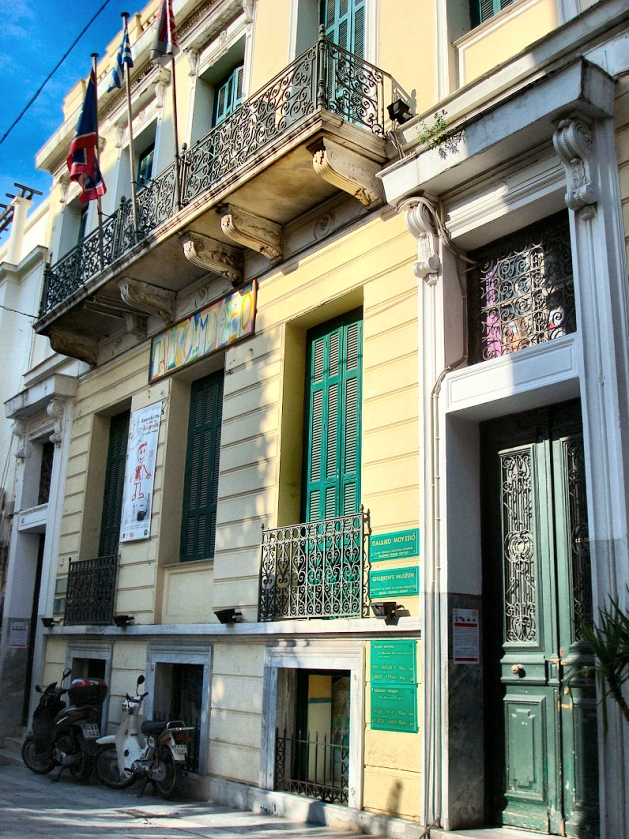
- Museum front entrance
- Established: 1987
- Location: 14 Kidathinaion Str. Plaka, Athens, Greece
- Coordinates: 37°58′20″N 23°43′54″E
- Type: Children's museum
- Public transit access: Athens Metro stations: Syntagma Station
- Website: hcm.gr/english

The Hellenic Children's Museum (Greek: Ελληνικό Παιδικό Μουσείο) in Athens, Greece is located in two houses specifically designed for use by children. The museum is also featured in the book, The Athens Assignment.

The Children's Museum of Athens was created in 1994 with the collaboration of the Municipality of Athens and was housed in a neoclassical building at 14 Kydathinaion Street in Plaka (1994-2017). Today, it is housed on the ground floor of the emblematic Athens Conservatory.
