= Archaeological Collection of Agios Andreas on Sifnos =

Museum in Agios Andreas, Sifnos, Greece

Coordinates: 36.74384°N 24.42361°E

The Archaeological Collection of Agios Andreas on Sifnos is a small local museum at the Archaeological site of Agios Andreas. In a modern building the Museum exhibits local findings, from the Mycenaean era until the 5th century BC. The museum was opened in 2010. Until that time was part of the local findings exposed in the Archaeological Museum of Sifnos, in the village of Kastro.

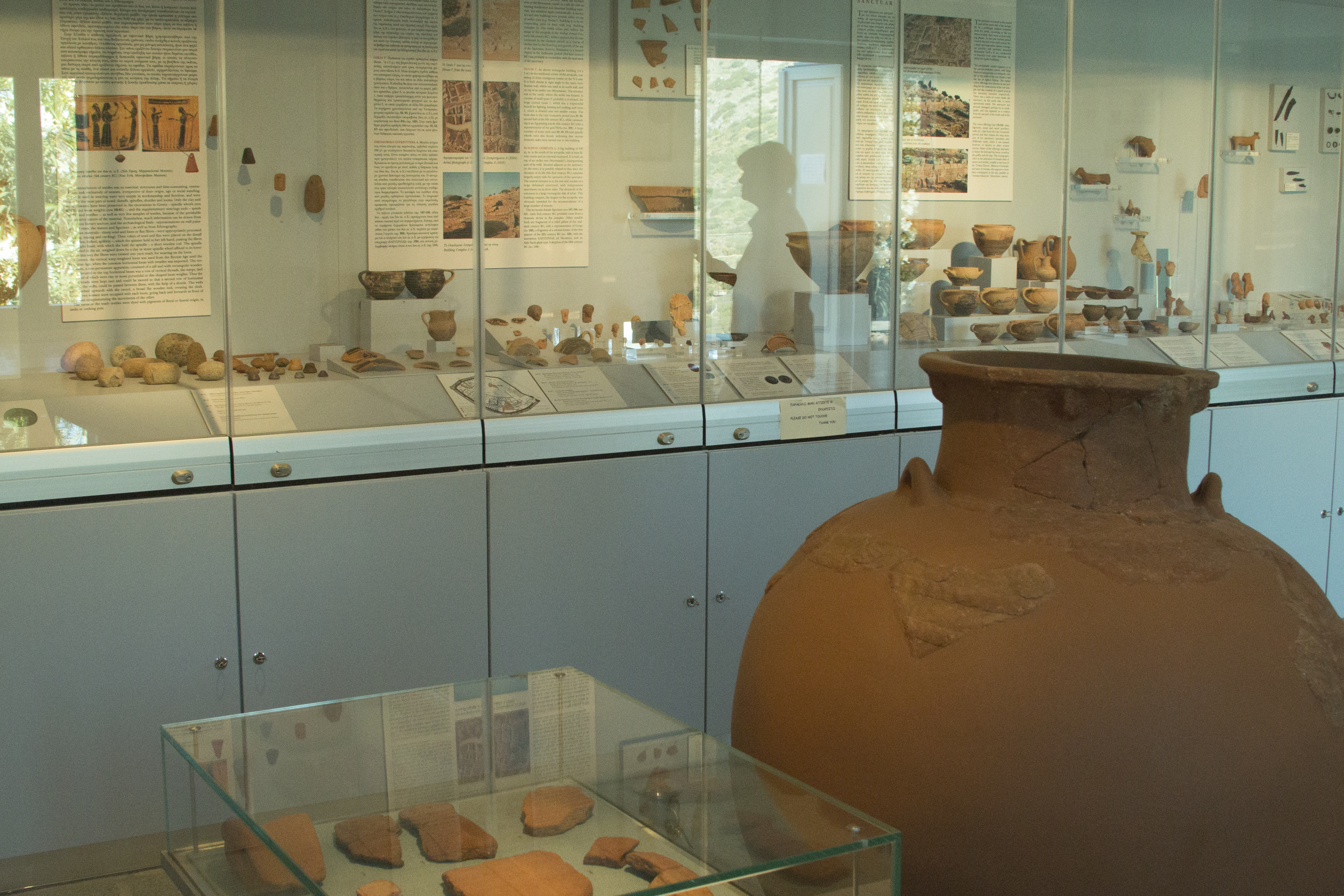
Looking to the Mycenaean part of the exhibition space

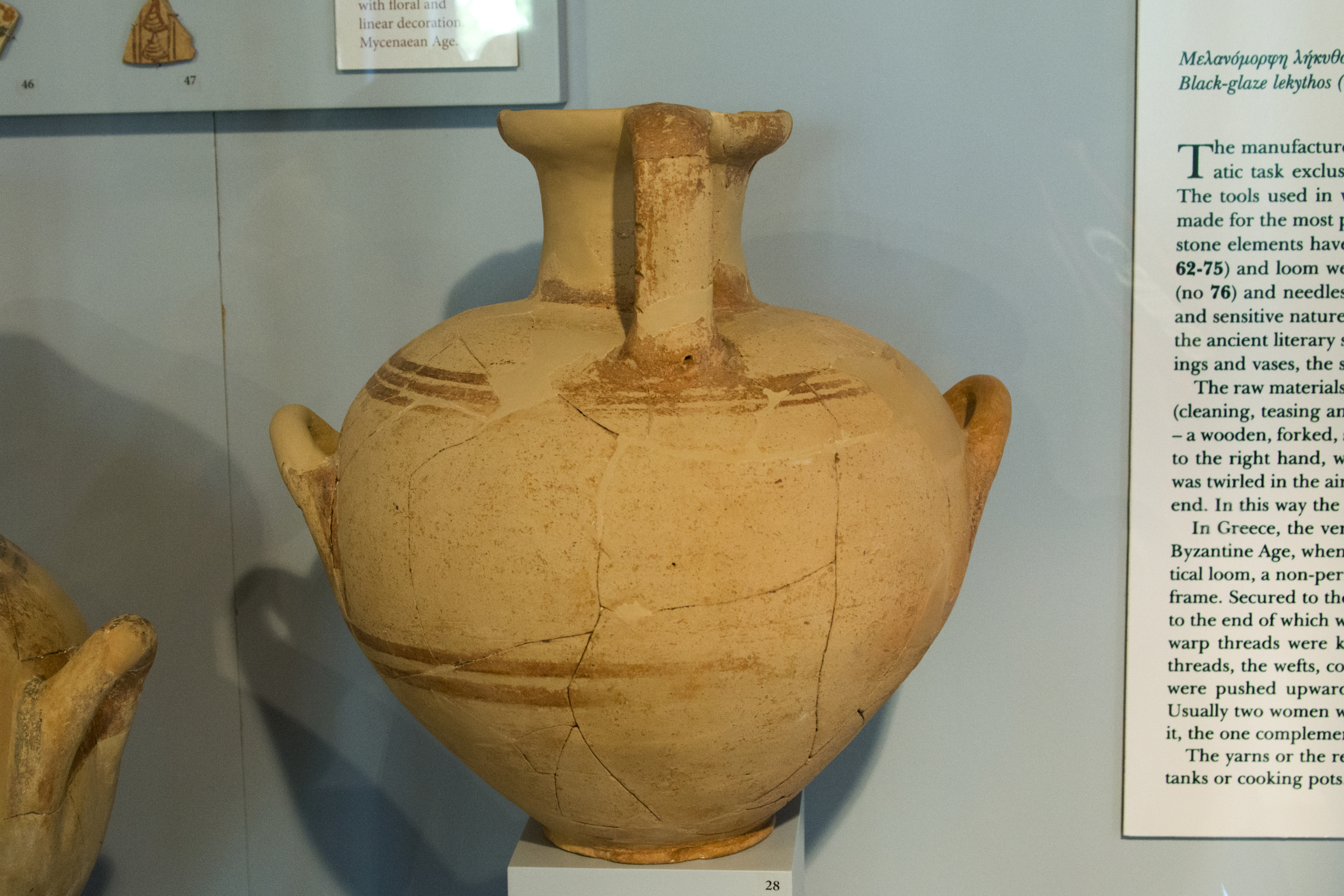
Mycenaean hydria, ca 1200 BC

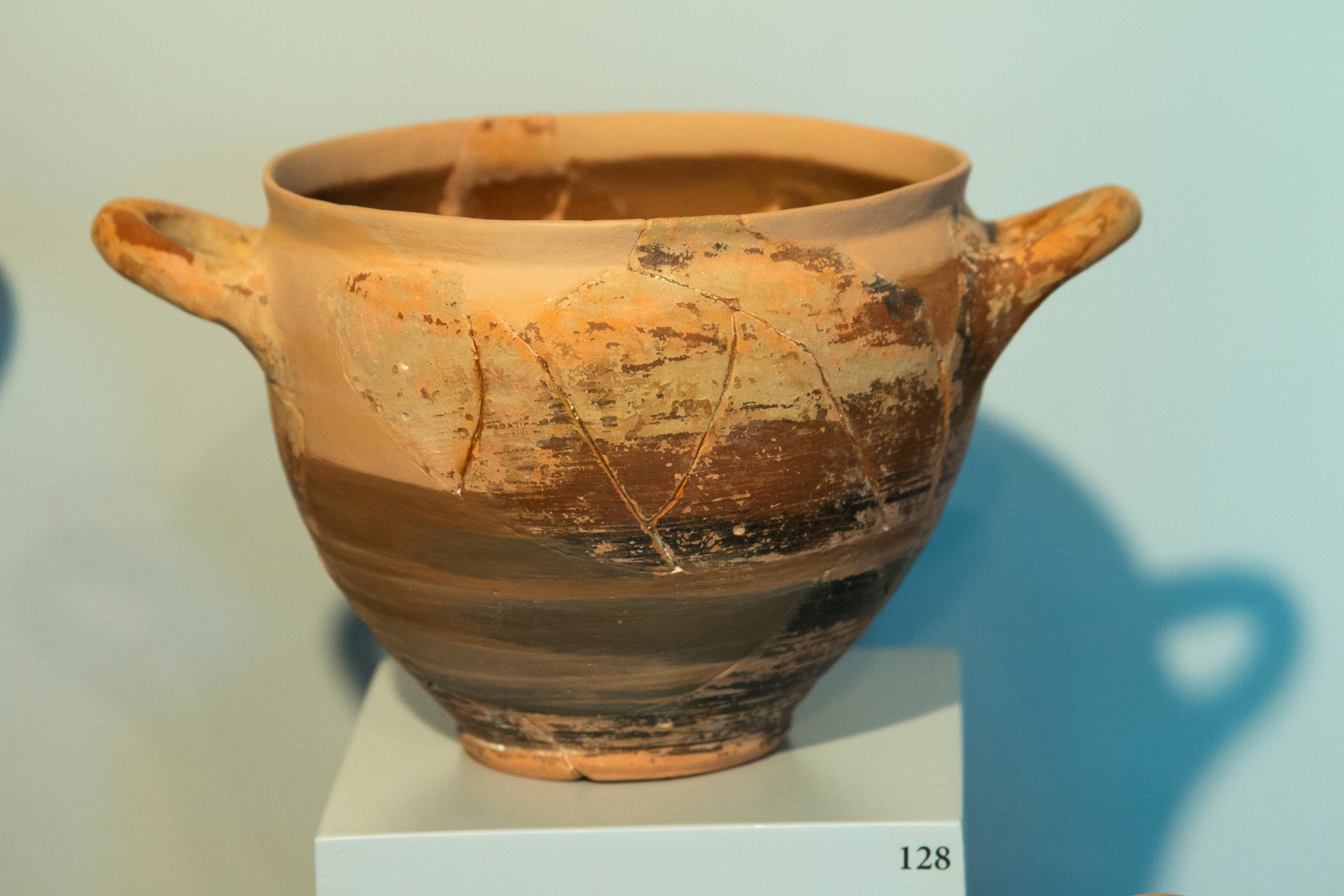
Late geometric monochrome skyphos, 750-700 BC

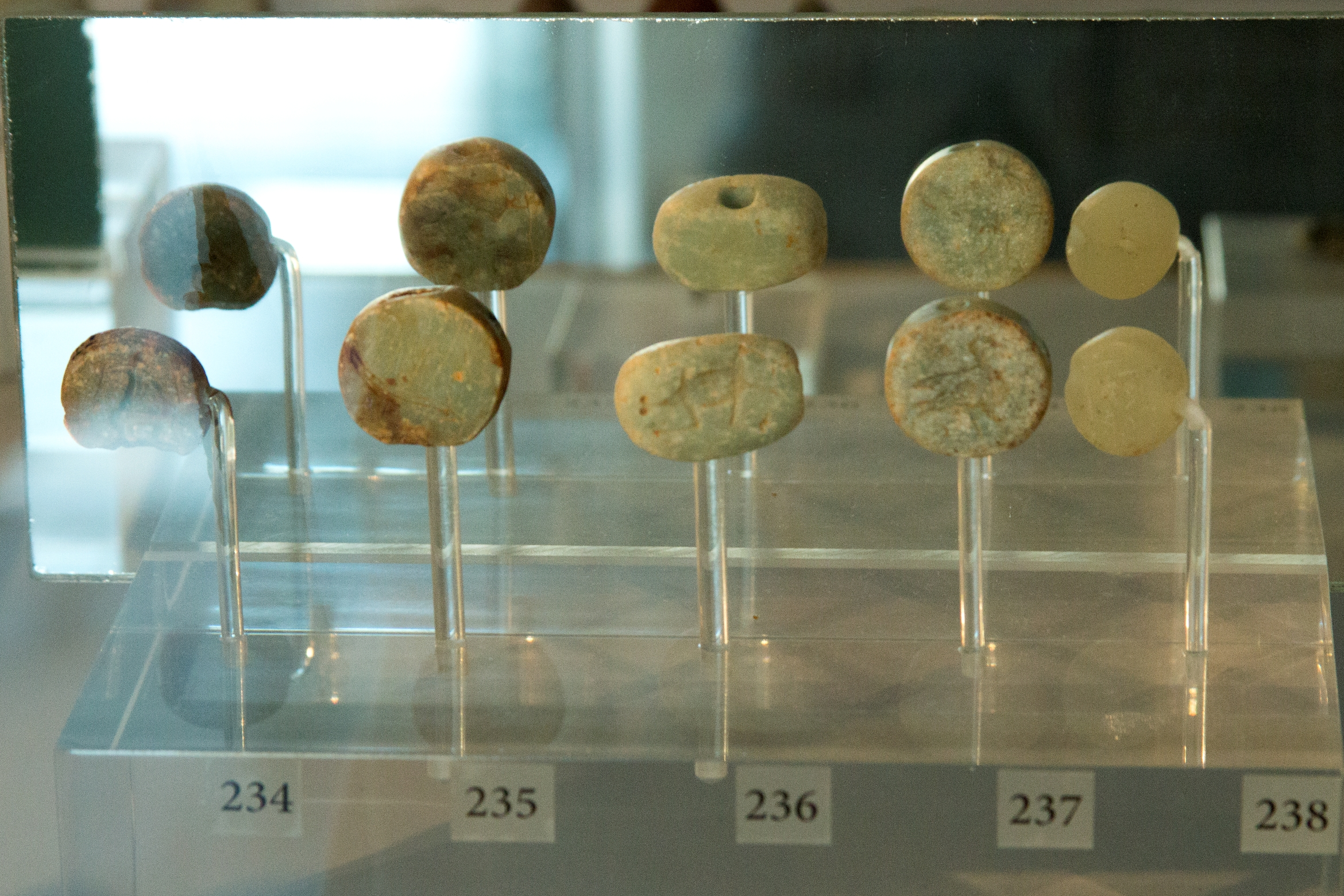
Stone seal-pendants, 800-600 BC
