= Postal & Philatelic Museum of Greece =

Philatelic museum in Athens, Greece

Coordinates: 37°58′11.25″N 23°44′27.39″E

Philatelic and Postal Museum
- Φιλοτελικό & Ταχυδρομικό Μουσείο
- Location within Athens
- Location: Athens, Greece
- Type: Philatelic and postal museum
- Website: ft-museum.gr

The Philatelic and Postal Museum of Greece is a museum dedicated to the philately and postal history of Greece. It is located at the junction of Stadiou Square and Fokianou Street, next to the Panathenaic Stadium (Kallimarmaro), in Athens.

== History ==
The establishment and operation of the Philatelic and Postal Museum was a long-standing request of the Hellenic Post Office Service and the Greek philatelic community. The project was officially supported by the Greek State in 1966. Four years later, in 1970, when the Hellenic Post Organization was established, the effort for amassing and sorting out the material meant for the museum begun. At the same time, an appropriate location to house the museum had to be found. Eventually, in 1977, benefactors Nia and Andrea Stratos donated the building that houses the museum to this day.

The Philatelic and Postal Museum opened on October 30, 1978, as part of the Hellenic Post (ELTA). Before the ELTA was privatised, the Greek government put the Museum under the control of the Ministry of Development, Competitiveness, Infrastructure, Transport and Networks. Today, the Museum lies under the jurisdiction of the Ministry of Digital Governance.

== Operation ==
The Philatelic and Postal Museum is responsible for acquiring, recording, studying, researching, documenting, publishing, promoting, and storing Hellenic Philatelic and Postal exhibits. The museum showcases objects used by the united Postal, Telegraph, and Telephone Service, including mailboxes, postman bags, horns and uniforms, envelope sealing machines, safes, bicycles, motorcycles, and dispatch materials. The museum's collection also includes the first-ever Greek stamps, dating to 1861, the metal plates used for their printing, stamp sheets, stamp proofs, detailed and rough layouts, first day covers, commemorative cachets, and painting layouts of famous artists who designed stamps.

== See also ==
- Hellenic Post
