= Maritime Museum of Crete =

Coordinates: 35°31′05.1″N 24°00′57″E

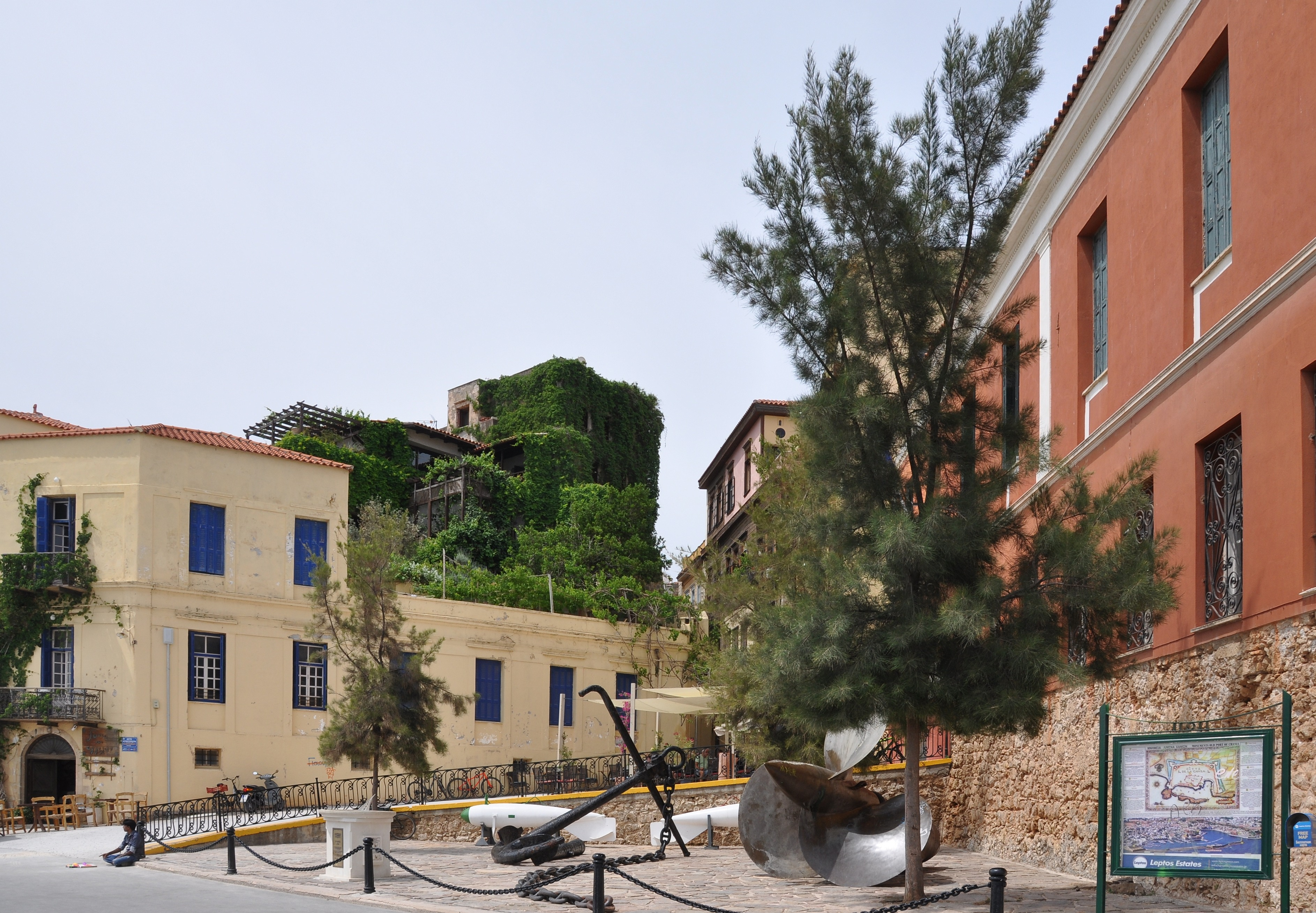
- External view of the museum building (right)
- Established: 1973
- Location: Chania, Crete, Greece
- Type: Maritime museum

The Maritime Museum of Crete is a museum in Chania, Crete, Greece. Its collection includes models of ships, nautical instruments, painting, historical photographs and war relics. The material is classified chronologically, starting from the Bronze Age up to our times.

== Main Collection ==
The main collection is located at the entrance to the Firka Fortress, on the West side of Chania harbour.

The exhibits of the first floor include models of ancient ships, a model of the fortified town and port under Venetian rule, a model that shows shipbuilding and repair buildings, with a rowing ship inside. There is also a room dedicated to natural marine life with a large collection of sea shells, sea sponges, corals, fossils and fish skin mounts.

The second floor exhibits include models of modern Hellenic Navy ships, destroyers, a missile boat, a landing ship with trucks and APVs on board. The exhibits include the full bridge of a destroyer and two torpedo propulsion units. A section of the museum is dedicated to the German invasion of Crete.

== Ancient Naval Architecture Collection and Minoan Ship Replica ==
In the Moro Shipyard at the eastern end of the harbour is a smaller exhibition of ancient naval architecture. This is dominated by a 17m experimental replica Minoan ship constructed between 2001 and 2004 (and eventually sailed and rowed to Piraeus).
