= Video Games Museum =

Video game museum in Greece

Coordinates: 35°20′09″N 25°08′11″E

The Video Games Museum is located in Heraklion, Crete, Greece. It opened to the public on 1 January 2025. The museum is dedicated to the history, preservation, and public presentation of video games as cultural and technological heritage.

== History ==
The museum opened to the public on 1 January 2025. Greek media later covered its official inauguration in Heraklion.

== Collection and exhibitions ==
The museum presents the history and development of video games through consoles, games, and related artifacts. Greek media coverage has described it as a museum space dedicated to the history of digital play, including permanent and interactive exhibition sections.

The museum's first temporary exhibition, Choose Your Weapon, focused on the history and evolution of video game controllers. In February 2026, it presented Pixel and Sound, a temporary exhibition focused on music and sound in video games.

== Preservation and public activity ==
The museum has participated in public discussions around videogame preservation and collections management.
