= Chios Byzantine Museum =

Former mosque, now museum, in Chios, Greece

Mecidiye Mosquee
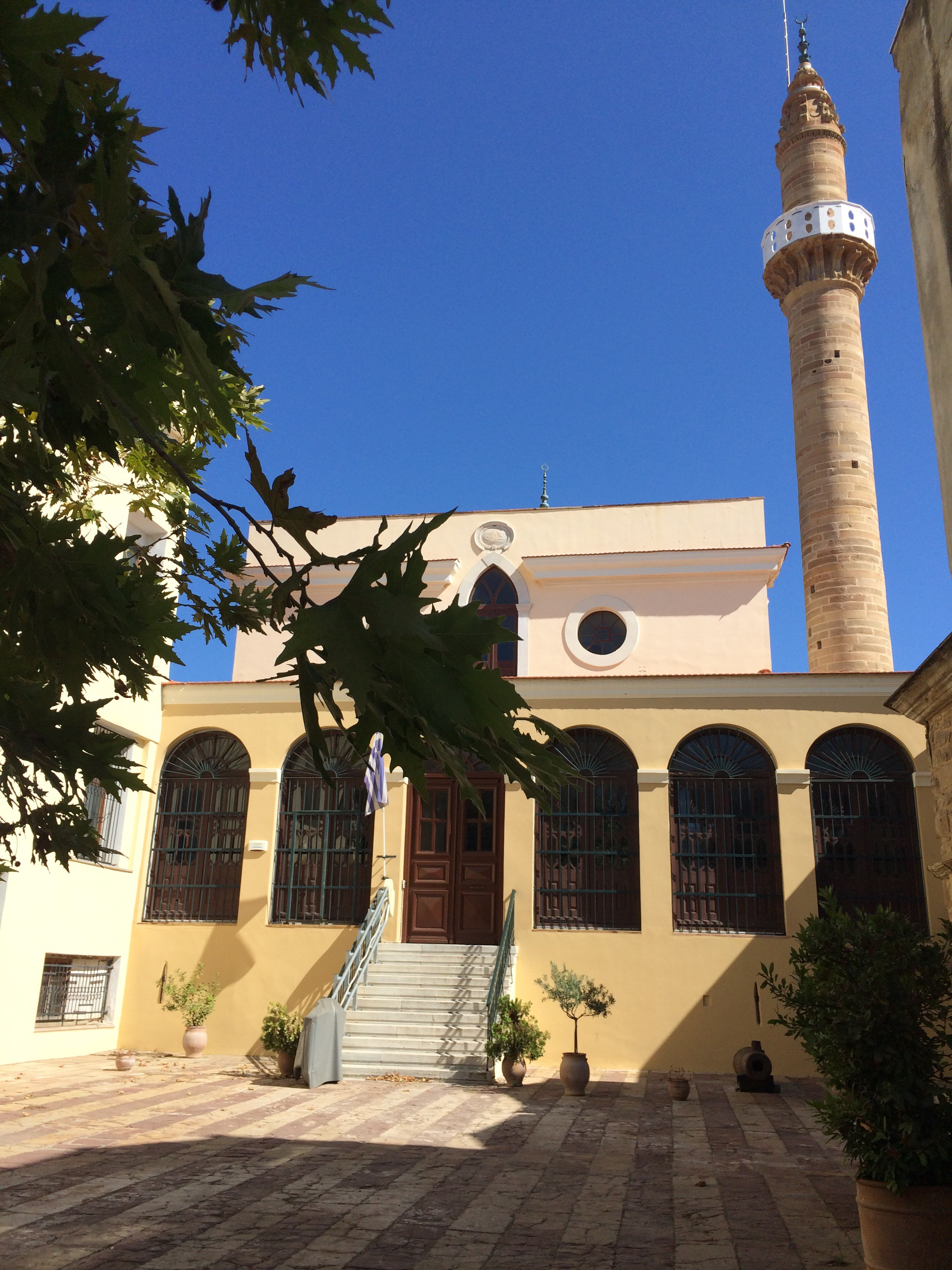
- The building facade

- Location of the former mosque, now museum, in Greece

Religion
- Affiliation: Islam (former)
- Ecclesiastical or organisational status: Mosque (19th century–1912)
- Status: Abandoned (as a mosque); Repurposed (as a history museum)

Location
- Location: Chios
- Country: Greece, North Aegean
- Interactive map of Mecidiye Mosquee
- Coordinates: 38°22′14″N 26°08′11″E

Architecture
- Type: Mosque
- Style: Ottoman
- Founder: Abdul Mecid I
- Completed: 19th century

Specifications
- Dome: 1
- Minaret: 1
- Materials: Brick; stone
- Chios Byzantine Museum
- Location: Chios, North Aegean
- Type: History museum

The Chios Byzantine Museum is a history museum in Chios, in the North Aegean region of Greece. The museum is located in a former mosque, the Mecidiye Mosque, built in the 19th century during the Ottoman era, that was abandoned in 1912.

== History ==
The mosque was called Mecidiye Mosque and was built in the 19th century by sultan Abdul Mecid I.

During the years 2006 to 2010, the museum underwent repair work, so it remained closed. The museum houses Christian and Byzantine sculptures in its yard, as well as exhibits from the Genoese and Ottoman periods of Chios' history.

== See also ==
- Islam in Greece
- List of museums in Greece
- List of former mosques in Greece
- Ottoman Greece
