= Eleftherios Venizelos Museum of Chalepa =

Historic house museum in Chania, Crete, Greece

Coordinates: 35.5185°N 24.0388°E

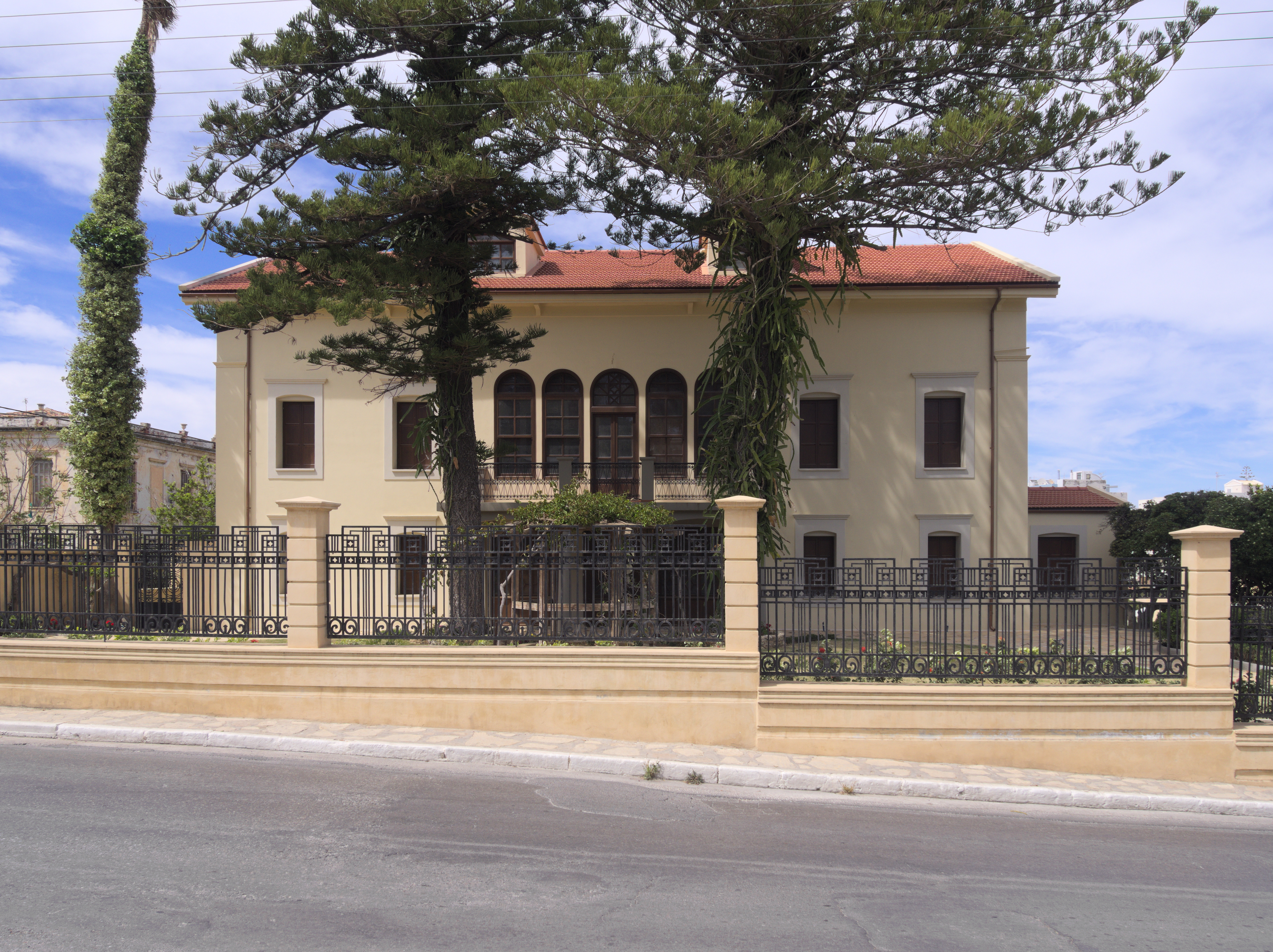
View of the museum

Eleftherios Venizelos Museum of Chalepa is an historic house museum in Chania, Crete, Greece. It is the paternal house of Eleftherios Venizelos, where he lived from 1880 to 1910, and occasionally, from 1927 to 1935. In March 2002, the Greek state assumed the ownership of the Venizelos residence, and then ceded it to the Eleftherios K. Venizelos Foundation. It is an historical house museum.
