= Zoological Museum of the University of Patras =

Museum in Patras, Greece

Coordinates: 38.2902°N 21.7899°E

The Zoological Museum of the Patras University is a museum in Patras, Greece. The museum was founded in 1968, and its headquarters are located on the university campus in Rio, Patras.

The museum has exhibition spaces, zoological collections, taxidermy facilities, as well as various auxiliary areas and research laboratories. Its exhibition halls contain approximately 60 display cases featuring taxidermied specimens of animals from the Greek fauna. Its scientific collections contain more than 3,500 specimens of vertebrates, which are also made available for research purposes. Other activities include educational visits by university students and school pupils, the use of museum material by students of the Department of Biology, the use of the museum's scientific collections for research, and broader public information and environmental awareness.
