= Archaeological Museum of Mystras =

- Αρχαιολογικό Μουσείο Μυστρά
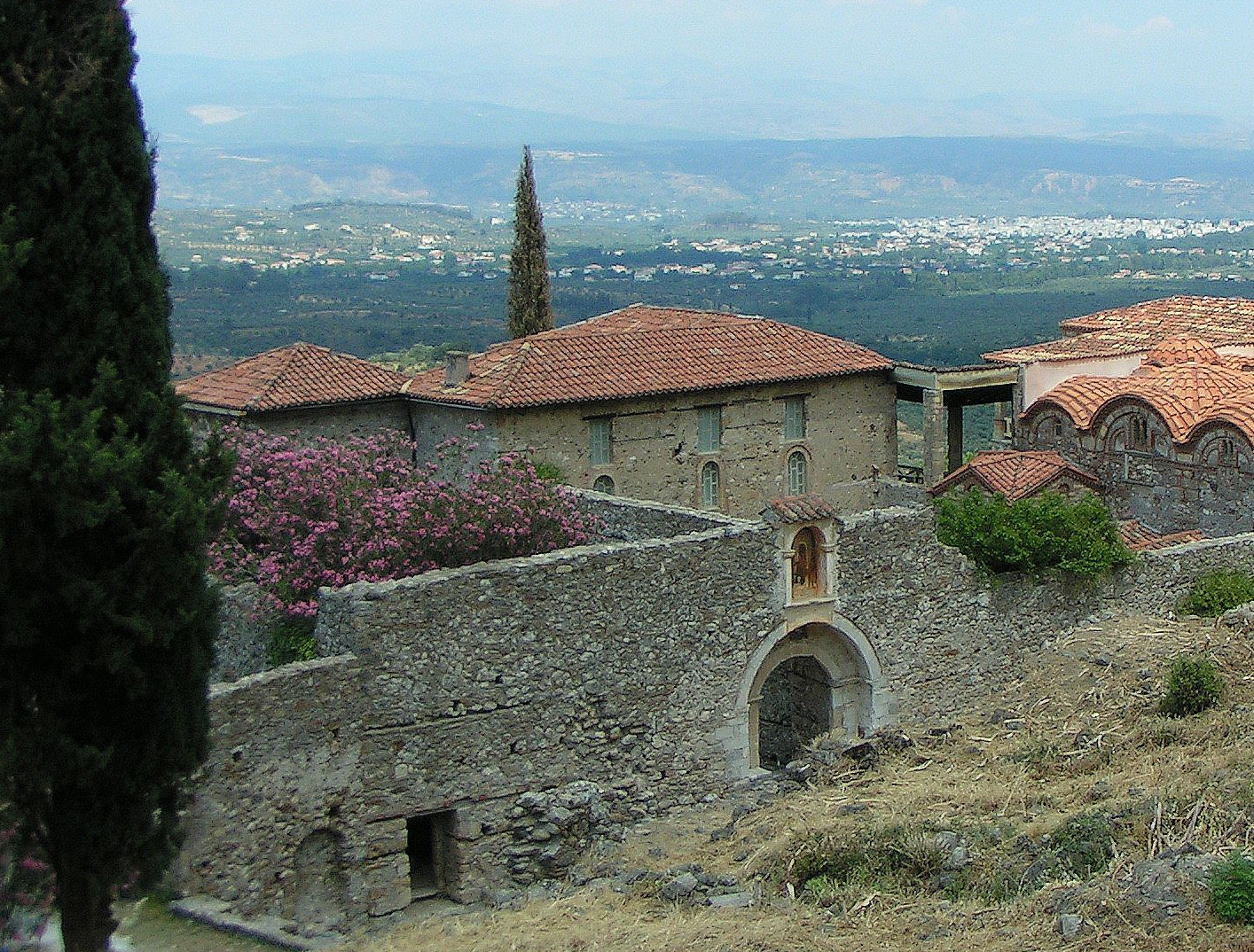
- Outside view
- Established: 1952
- Location: Mystras, Greece
- Coordinates: 37.07633398057739°N 22.368875379313334°E
- Type: Archaeological museum
- Founder: Ephorate of Antiquities of Laconia

The Archaeological Museum of Mystras (Greek: Αρχαιολογικό Μουσείο Μυστρά) is a museum in Mystras in Greece. In spite of its naming it is classified as a Byzantine museum. It was inaugurated in 1951, but officially was founded in 1952 by the Ephorate of Antiquities of Laconia in the west wing of the metropolitan complex, its exhibits range from the early Christian era to Post-Byzantine times, but also include older and more recent items.

== History ==
The first informal museum on the east wing of the metropolitan complex was founded by the French Byzantine scholar Gabriel Millet in the late 19th century, were placed there sculptural architectural members from the temples of Mystras, later at the beginning of the 20th century the collection was enriched, with the contribution of the Metropolitan of Sparta Theoklitos Minopoulos.

In the year 2001 the permanent exhibition was reorganized, with a new thematic, museological and museographic approach, which was also dictated by the need to present the latest findings of the research.

== Gallery ==
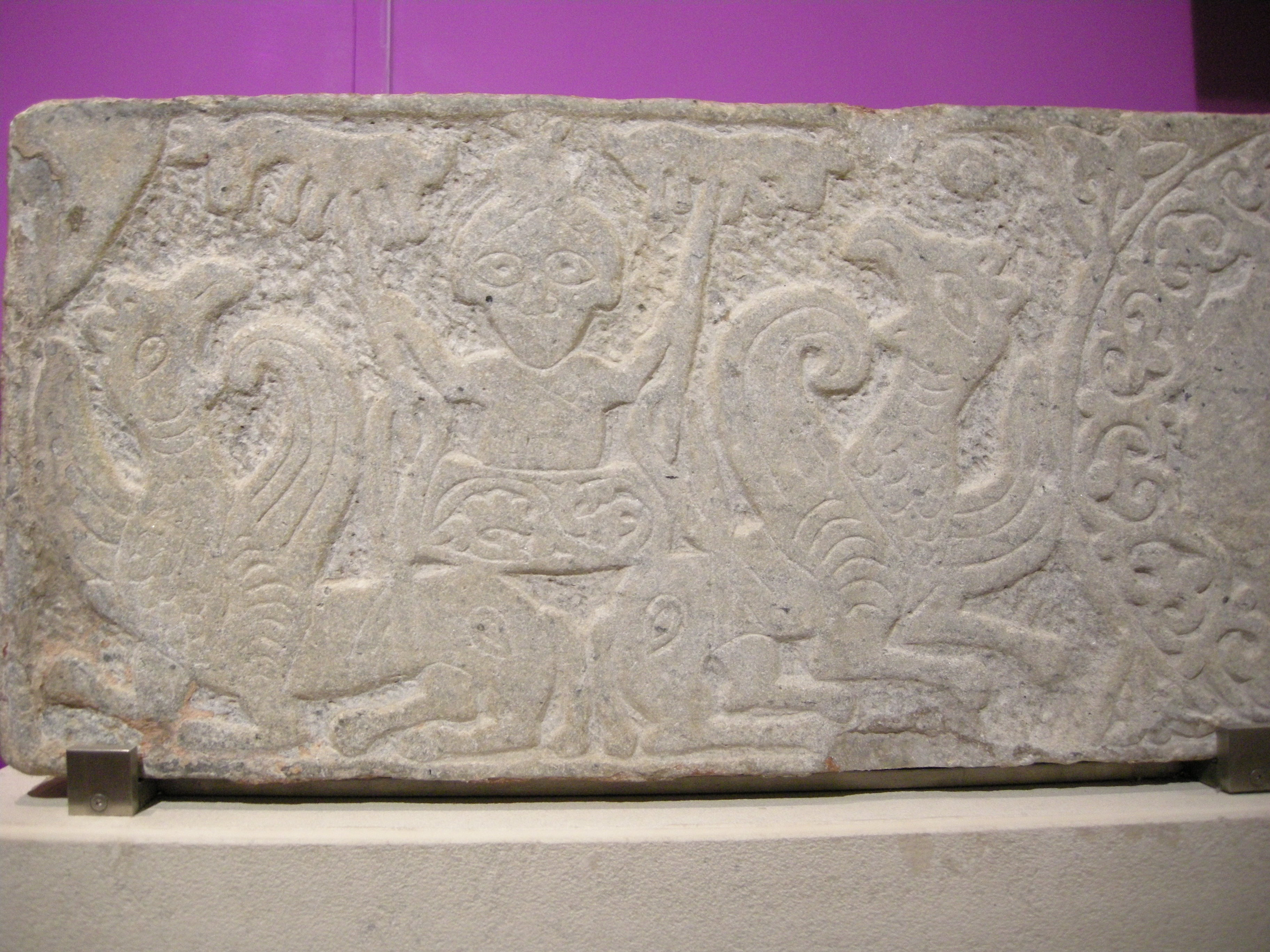
Relief depicting Alexander the Great, c. 1350–1400.

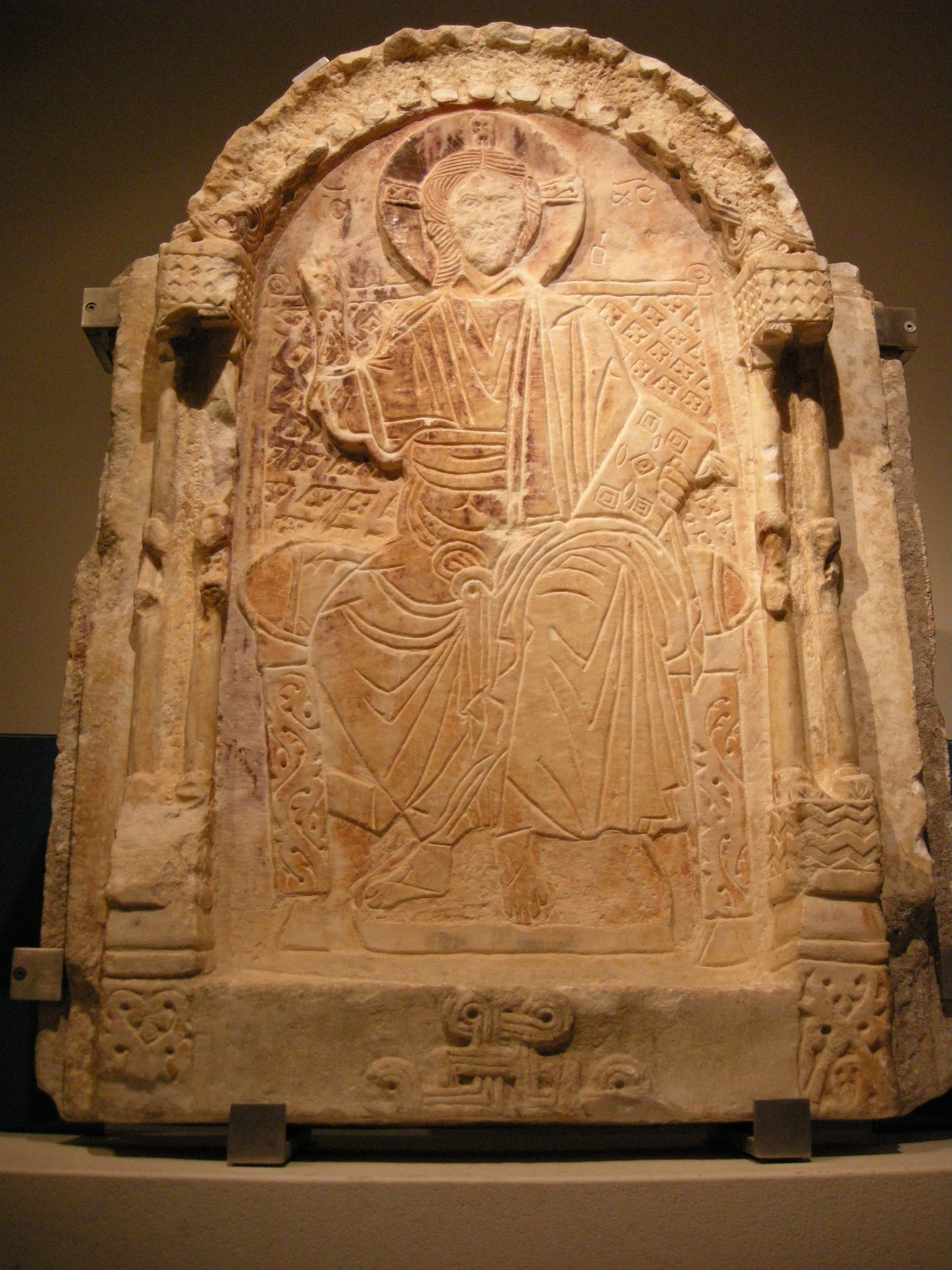
Christ sitting on the throne, c. 1350–1400.

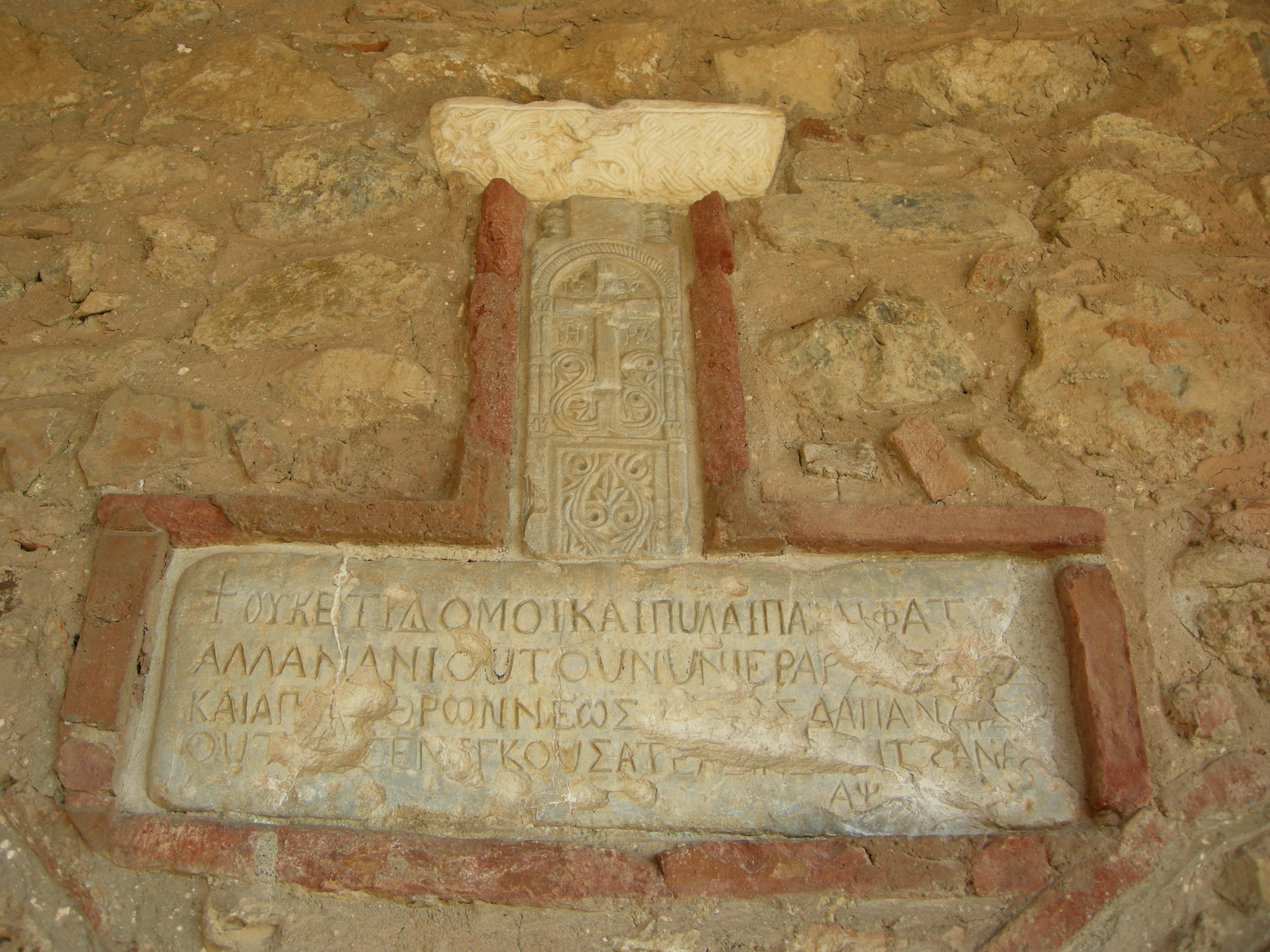
Plaque relief.

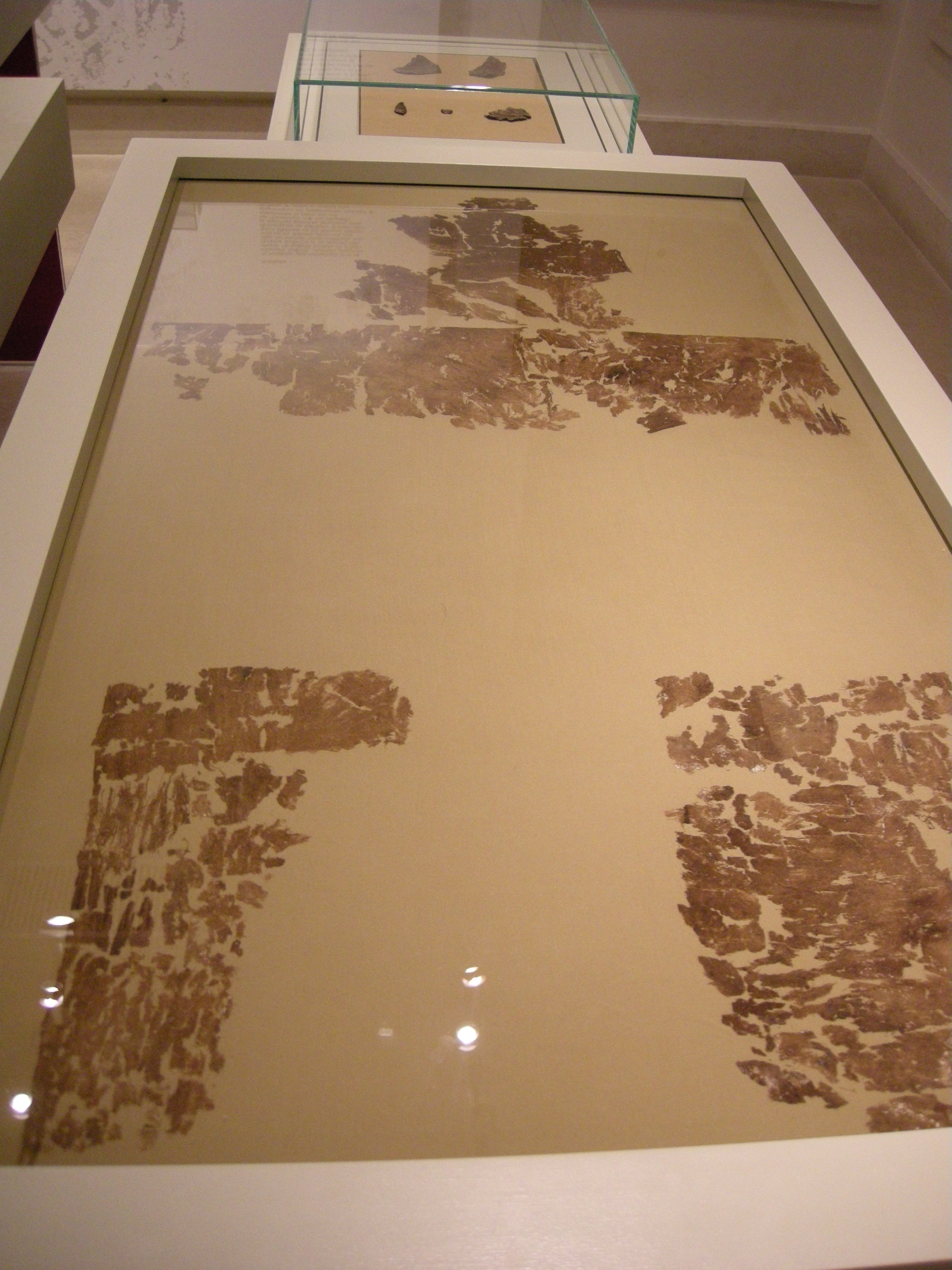
Remains of the Mystras mummy outfit.

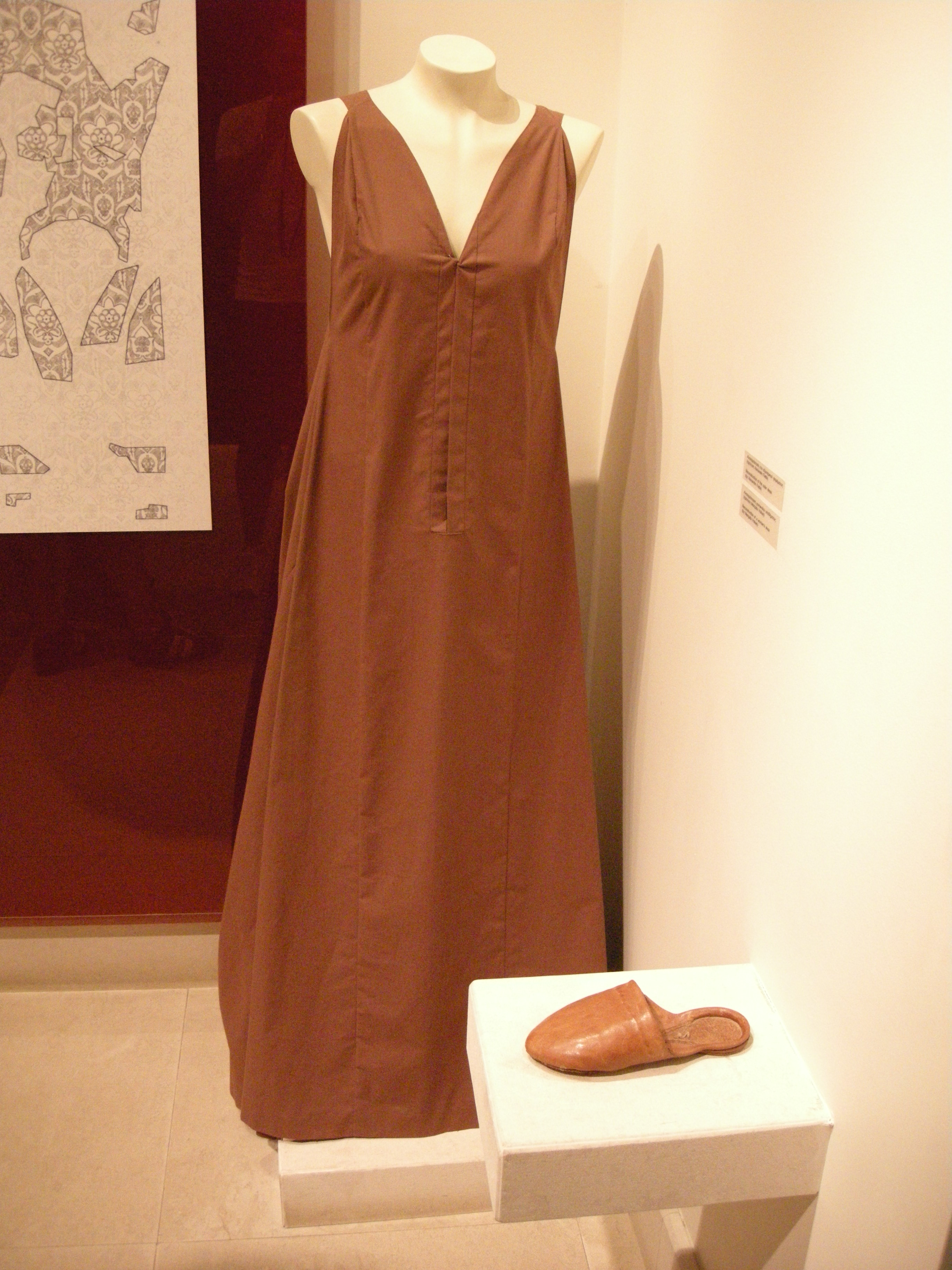
Reconstruction of the outfit of the Mystras mummy.

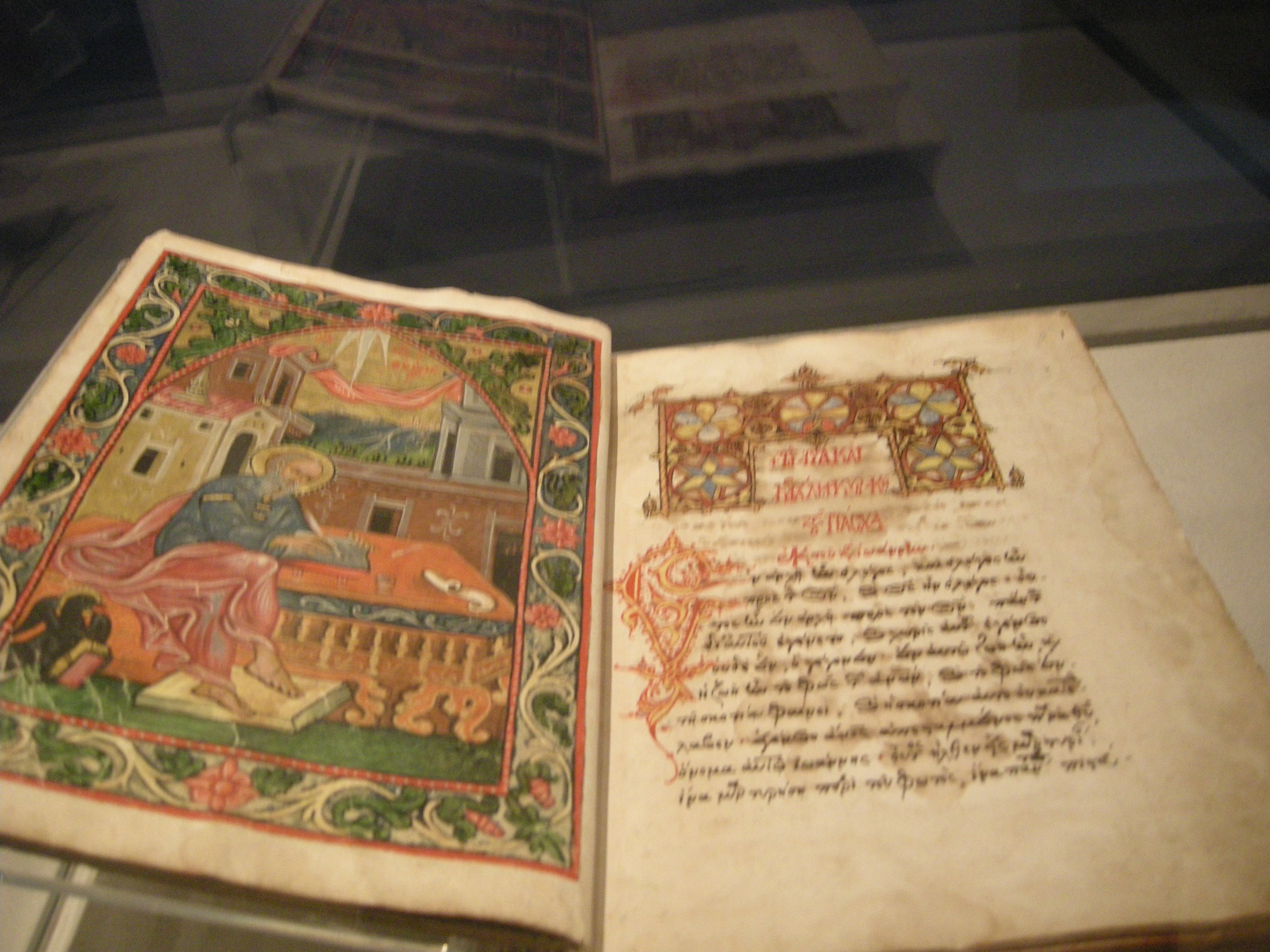
Scripting Code.
