= Museum of Anthropology, University of Athens =

Museum in Athens, Greece

Coordinates: 37.98405°N 23.76713°E

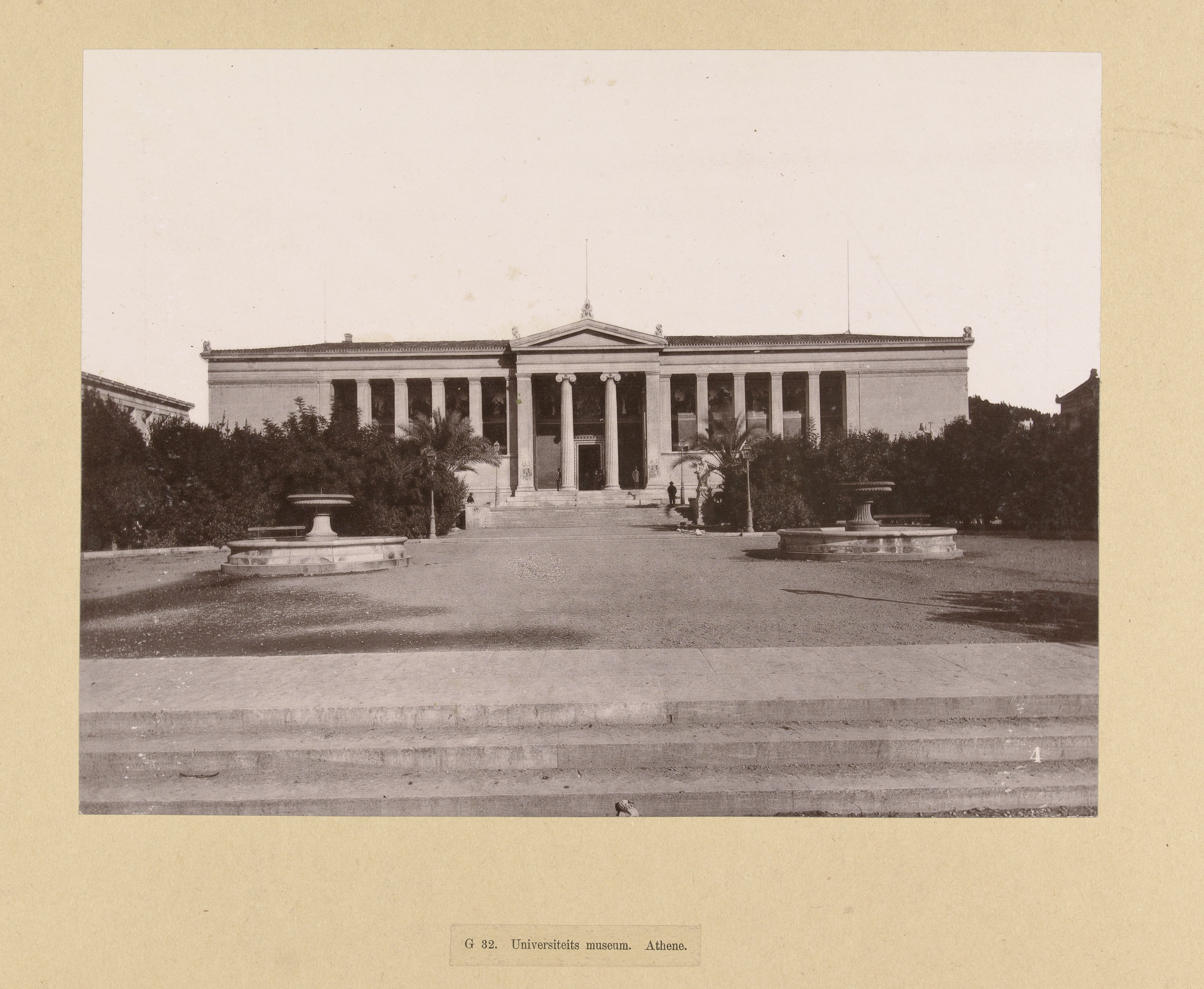
Museum of Anthropology, ca. 1900

The Museum of Anthropology, University of Athens is an educational museum in Athens, Greece.

The museum was founded at the University of Athens in 1886. It was initially part of the university's medical school, in its department of histology. The founder, Klon Stephanos, has been described as the "father of physical anthropology" in Greece, Under Stephanos, the museum emphasized its function as research laboratory, rather than as a venue for public displays. It received many early contributions from the medical faculty in the area of anatomical pathology, and became an important repository within Greece for historical anthropological specimens that had in the past been sent to foreign institutions.

Stephanos died in 1915, and Ioannis Koumaris became the second director of the museum, a position he held until 1950.
