= Folklore Museum of Katerini =

Museum in Katerini, Greece

Coordinates: 40°16′10.7″N 22°29′56.1″E

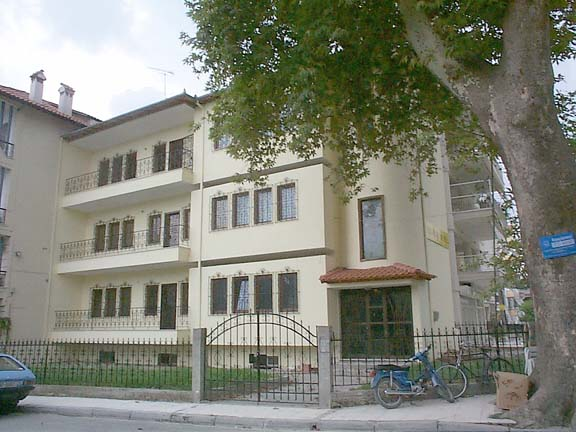
Outside view

The Folklore Museum of Katerini was set up by the Pieria Pontic Association, and is housed in a building owned by the Association in the centre of Katerini, Macedonia, Greece, near the Municipal Park. It opened in 1990, following efforts to collect folklore material still in the possession of refugee families from the Pontos who had settled in the Pieria region. The campaign had been carried out by a three-member committee under the supervision of Professors Dimitrios Pandermalis and Nora Skouteri.

The purpose of the museum is to preserve and promote the cultural wealth of the Pontic Greeks. It has some 600 objects of social, folkloric, and historical interest, some of which are extremely valuable.

In the entrance hall there are a large map of the Black Sea, with the major centres marked, photographs of schools and village elders from the towns of Kotyora, Sukhumi, and Kars, and refugees’ personal effects (books, embroidered fabrics, aprons).

The main part of the museum displays a reconstruction of the main parts of a Pontic house: the reception room with divans around a low round table, wall-hangings embroidered with the letters of the alphabet by the unmarried women, and icon-stands, and women’s costumes from Fatsa, Oenoe, and Trebizond. Next to this is the bedroom, with a bed, kilims, rugs, mats, the outfit of a newly married woman from Kotyora, and other furniture. Then there is the kitchen with fireplace, table, cooking utensils, lamps, brazier. Finally, a number of agricultural implements are displayed in a corner, together with a bench of tools of the comb-maker’s trade.

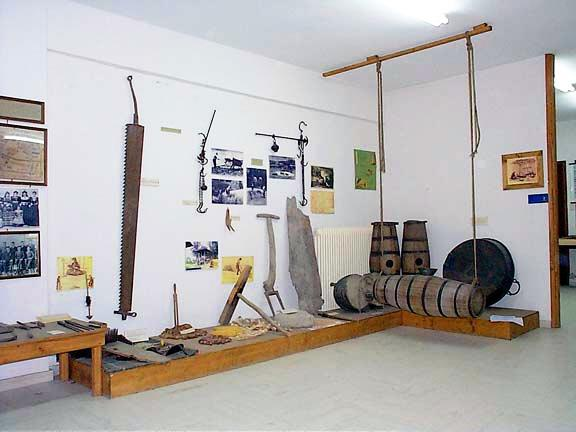
Agricultural implements

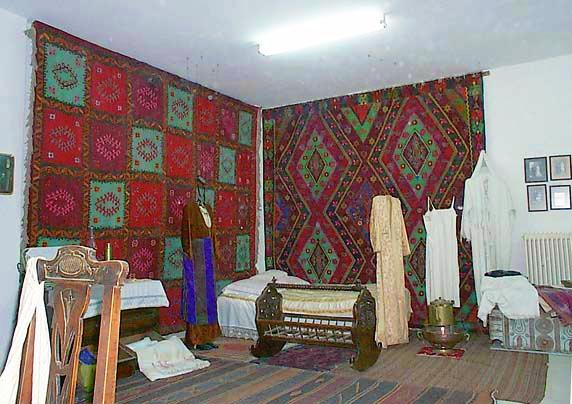
Traditional bedroom

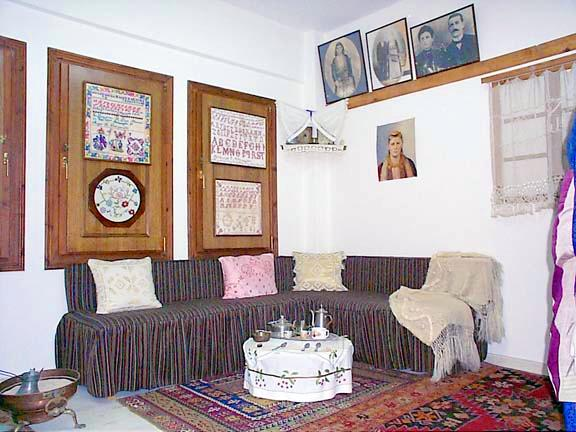
The reception room

== Sources ==
- This article incorporates text from the corresponding article at the Museums of Macedonia website, commissioned by the Macedonian Heritage foundation, written by Vlasis Vlasidis, and published under a CC-BY-SA-3.0 license.
