= Distomo Archaeological Collection =

- Established: 1994
- Location: Distomo, Boeotia, Central Greece, Greece
- Type: Archaeological museum

The Distomo Archaeological Collection is a museum in Distomo, in Boeotia, Central Greece. The museum, noted for its pottery collection, was established in 1994 and is supervised by the Tenth Ephorate of Prehistoric and Classical Antiquities.

== History ==
The idea of a museum began in 1987, when the local council donated an old stone primary school erected in 1903 to the Greek Ministry of Culture, which began renovating and restoring the building.

== Collection ==
The museums contain a notable pottery collection from Medeon and Antikyra. It has a number of vases unearthed ancient Medeon. The vases from Antikyra date between the 8th and 2nd centuries BC. One of the notable artifacts is a clay sima. It was discovered in a building in Antikyra and is dated to the 4th century BC.
