= Museum of Sea Life at Rethymno =

Defunct museum in Rethymno, Crete, Greece

Museum of Sea Life at Rethymno was a museum in Rethymno, Crete, Greece. It was located in Arabatzoglou Street in Rethymno, Crete in the old abbey of what is referred to as the old town.

It is now closed, with no apparent plans to reopen.
