= Archaeological Museum of Mytilene =

Museum in Mytilene, Lesbos, Greece

Coordinates: 39.1069°N 26.5617°E

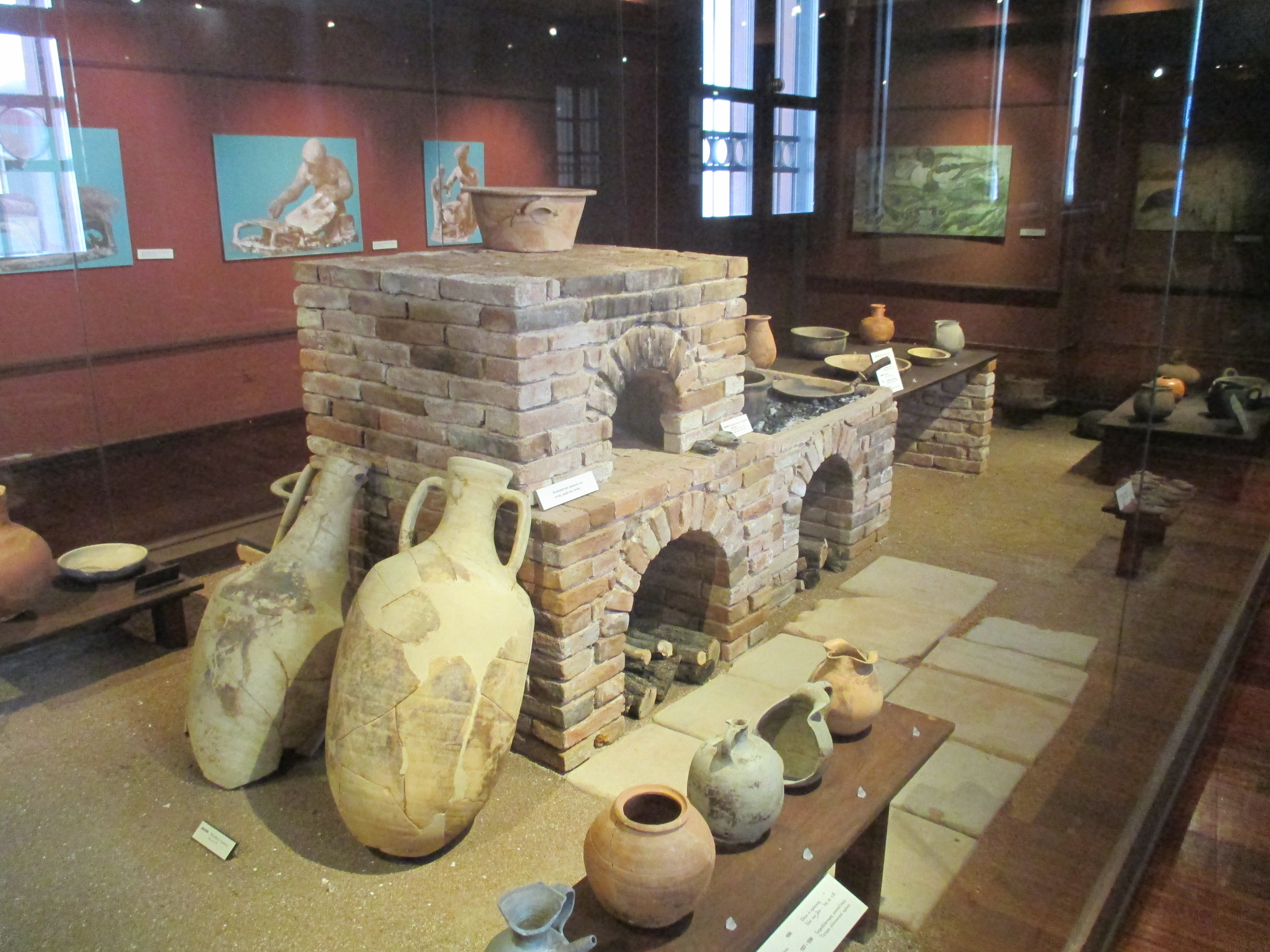
Exhibits

The Archaeological Museum of Mytilene is a museum in Lesbos in Greece. Initially the museum was housed in a building erected by the American Classic Studies School in 1935. Due to geological problems, the stability of the building was damaged and, in 1965, the museum's collection was partly moved to the Bournazos family mansion, originally built in 1912, which was acquired by the Ministry of Culture in the same year. However, this building had to be renovated as well, and it wasn't until 1991 that the museum took its present form and was officially inaugurated.

The collection includes pieces from the late Neolithic Age until the late Roman Period.
