= Archaeological Museum of Astypalaia =

- Αρχαιολογικό Μουσείο Αστυπάλαιας
- Established: September 1998
- Location: Astypalaia, Greece
- Coordinates: 36.54883560153407°N 26.352451846924367°E
- Type: Archaeological museum
- Owner: Ephorate of Antiquities of Dodecanese
- Website: via odysseus.culture.gr

The Archaeological Museum of Astypalaia (Greek: Αρχαιολογικό Μουσείο Αστυπάλαιας) is a museum in Astypalaia, Greece.

== History ==
The museum is housed in a ground-floor hall, which was granted to the Hellenic Ministry of Culture by the Ecclesiastical Charity Fund of Astypalaia in 1994. The exhibition was organized in 1995–1996 and in the following years it was improved and enriched with the special audio-visual program (Echorama), eventually leading to the opening of the museum in September 1998.

== Exhibits ==
The exhibition contains finds that cover a wide chronological range, from the prehistoric period down to medieval times.

Its exhibits include:

- A collection of a lot prehistoric finds.
- Silver coin treasure of the classical era, found on the island.
- The votive inscribed base of Apollo with the footprints of the monumental statue, 4th century BC.
- Part of a golden wreath with leaves and fruits.
- Inscribed column with a sacred law regarding the conditions for entering a sanctuary, 3rd century BC.
- Inscribed stone column with a letter from the emperor Hadrian to the lords and the Parliament of Cnidia.
- Collection of pottery of geometric to Roman times from the necropolises of Katsalos and Kilindra.
- Marble shields, capitals and other parts of early Christian basilicas.
- Marble coat of arms of the Querini family of governors of the island, from the local Venetian castle.
