= Melina Merkouri Cultural Center =

Coordinates: 37°58′34.1″N 23°42′51.5″E

The Melina Merkouri Cultural Centre is a municipal cultural organization in Athens, Greece. It is housed in an impressive old hat factory in Thisseio. The Centre has two permanent exhibitions, the one called "Travelogue of Athens", which presents the neighborhoods of Athens at the beginning of the 20th century, and the other "The Charidimos Shadow Theater", with figures and materials of the famous shadow theater artist. The centre also includes the "Melina" hall, a 220 square metres (2,400 sq ft) room where temporary exhibitions, events and concerts, but also seminars and meetings take place. Another room of 380 square metres (4,100 sq ft) and 5 metres (16 ft) height is meant for large-scale exhibits.
