= Zygomalas Museum =

Museum in Greece

Coordinates: 38°15′07″N 23°41′22″E

The Zygomalas Museum is a museum in Avlonas, Attica, Greece. It exhibits a collection of applied arts, traditional costumes and objects related to schools. The museum was established in 1937.
