= School Life Museum =

Academia exhibits Museum

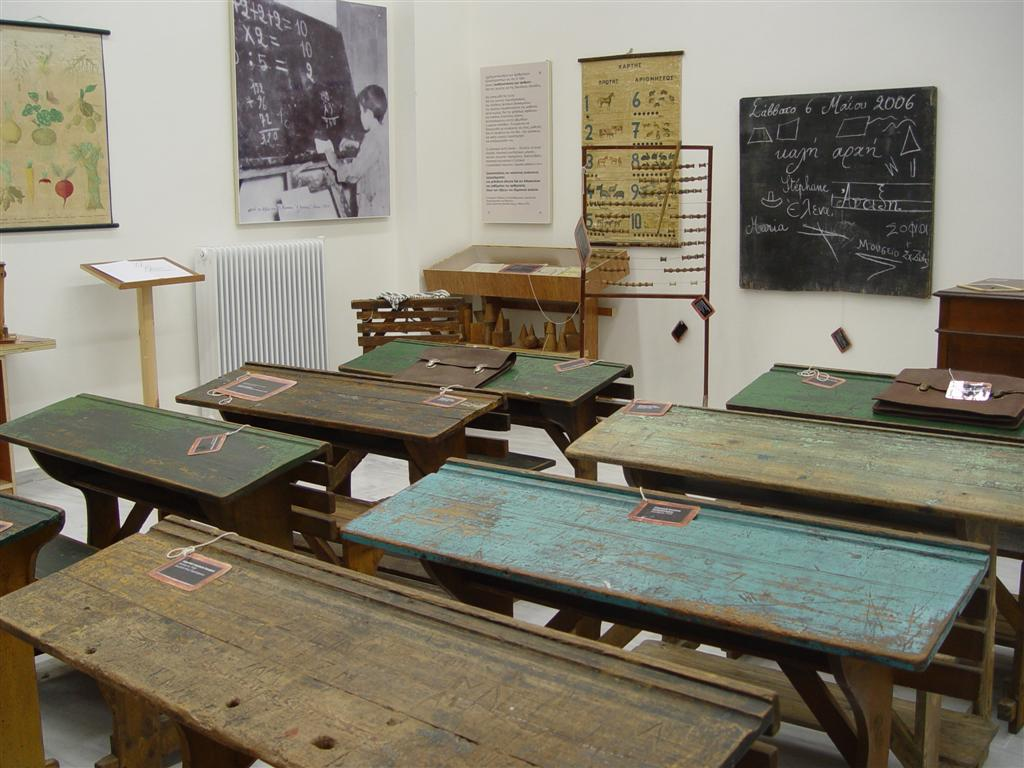
Old desks in a classroom

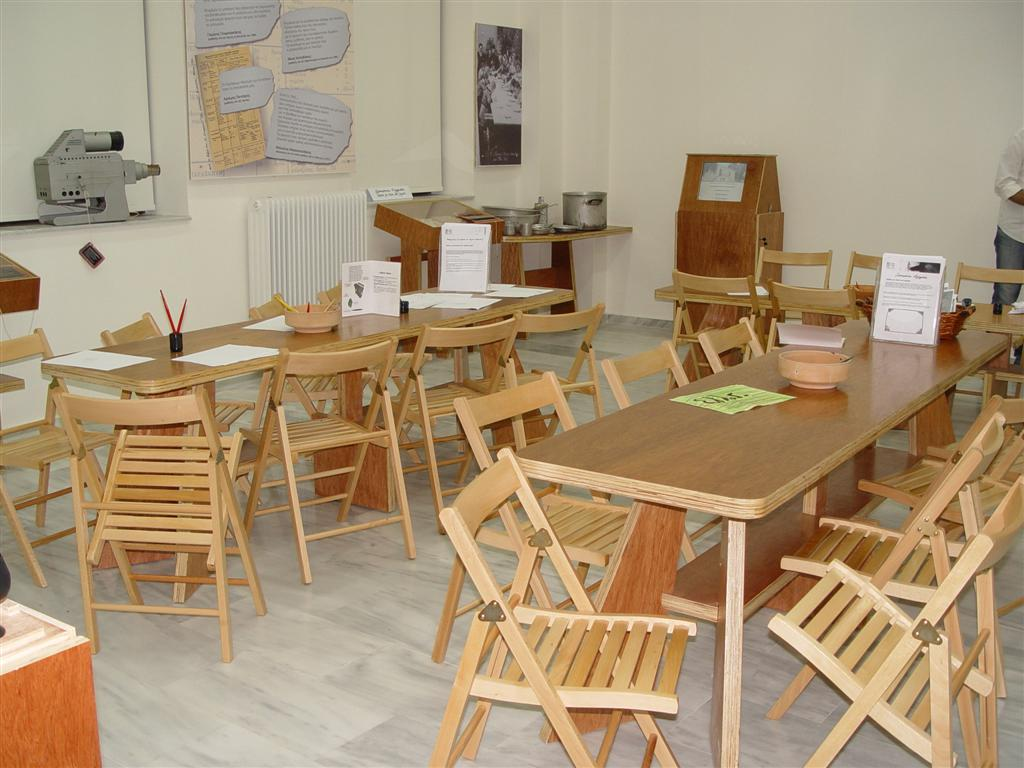
Classroom in the School Life Museum

The School Life Museum (in Greek:Μουσείο Σχολικής Ζωής) is a museum in Nerokouros, approximately 3.5 kilometers south of Chania, Crete, Greece.

The museum seeks to develop into a centre of culture which will focus on the educational and pedagogical practices of the past, the present and the future.

== Background ==
The museum was established in 2006, based in the old primary school of the village, which dates back to 1929. The school closed its doors as a functional school in 2000, due to a larger primary school opening nearby. When this happened, Headteacher Dimitris Kartsakis and his wife Maria Drakaki chose to reopen the school as a new type of educational tool.

The museum's primary aim is to research, preserve, and present the educational and pedagogical practices of the past, archiving and restoring objects from the school's own history. It serves as a center for cultural exchange and educational development, offering insights into the evolution of schooling in Crete and Greece more broadly.

Beyond its role as a repository of educational artifacts, the School Life Museum actively engages with the community through workshops, interactive exhibits, and special events.

== Exhibits and Collections ==
Visitors to the museum can explore a diverse collection of artifacts that reflect the school life of previous generations. These include:

- Vintage school desks and blackboards
- Inkwells, slate writing tablets, and typewriters
- Historical textbooks, notebooks, and pedagogical manuals
- Teaching aids such as wall charts, globes, and abacuses
- Photographs, documents, and personal items donated by former students and teachers

The museum's exhibitions recreate classrooms from different eras, from the 1930s to the 1960s, providing an immersive experience that allows visitors to understand the educational environment of the past.
