= Archaeological Museum of Syros =

Coordinates: 37.4451411°N 24.9423797°E

Archaeological Museum Of Syros
- Established: 1 January 1889
- Location: Hermoupolis; Syros, Greece
- Type: Archaeological Museum
- Owner: Hellenic Ministry of Culture and Tourism

The Archaeological Museum Of Syros is located in Ermoupoli in Syros. It was established in 1889

== See also ==
- www.culture.gr
