= Archaeological Museum of Kalymnos =

Coordinates: 36.95466674310927°N 26.983755695863668°E

- Established: 2009
- Location: Pothia, Dodecanese, Greece
- Type: Archaeological museum
- Collections: Archaeological finds from Kalymnos (prehistoric – post-Byzantine period)
- Owner: Hellenic Ministry of Culture
- Website: Official website

The Archaeological Museum of Kalymnos is a public museum located in the town of Pothia on the island of Kalymnos, Greece. It serves as one of the main institutions presenting the archaeological and historical identity of the island. It operates under the administrative authority of the Hellenic Ministry of Culture and the Ephorate of Antiquities of the Dodecanese.

The museum was inaugurated in 2009 and was established to collect, preserve, and present archaeological material originating from both systematic excavations and accidental discoveries on land and underwater around the island. Its permanent exhibition covers a wide chronological range from the prehistoric period to the post-Byzantine era, highlighting continuous human presence on Kalymnos.

A particularly important exhibit is the Hellenistic bronze statue known as the “Lady of Kalymnos”, which was recovered from the sea in 1995 by a local fisherman. The artifact is considered one of the most significant examples of Hellenistic sculpture in the Aegean due to its artistic quality and exceptional state of preservation.

== History ==
The establishment of the museum was part of a broader effort to strengthen cultural infrastructure in the Dodecanese in the early 21st century. The selection of Pothia as its location reflects its role as the administrative and economic center of the island.

The museum was also created to centralize archaeological finds that had previously been scattered or stored under temporary conditions without systematic exhibition.

== Building and facilities ==
The museum building is located in the center of Pothia and is designed to support modern museum exhibition standards. The exhibition spaces are organized into thematic sections, allowing visitors to follow the historical development of the island through the artifacts.

The building is fully accessible, with ramps and elevators for visitors with mobility impairments, as well as adapted restroom facilities.

== Collections ==
The museum’s collections include artifacts spanning the entire historical timeline of Kalymnos. Prehistoric finds consist mainly of stone tools and pottery, documenting early human settlement on the island.

Classical and Hellenistic periods are represented by sculptures, inscriptions, and metal objects related to public and religious life. Roman and Byzantine periods are represented through coins, architectural fragments, and ecclesiastical objects.

The “Lady of Kalymnos” remains the most recognizable exhibit and a central reference point for the museum.

== Visitor information ==
The museum is open daily except Tuesdays from 08:30 to 15:30. Admission costs 5 euros, with reduced or free entry for students and specific visitor categories according to the Ministry of Culture.

It is easily accessible from the center of Pothia within the urban area.
