= Aetolia-Acarnania Folklore Museum =

Museum in Agrinio, Greece

Coordinates: 38.623878°N 21.406368°E

The Aetolia-Acarnania Folklore Museum is a museum in Agrinio, Greece.

The museum was founded in 1977 by the pan-Aetolia-Acarnania women's association.
