= Water Supply Museum =

Museum in Thessaloniki, Greece

Coordinates: 40°38′30.75″N 22°54′58″E

The Water Supply Museum is a museum in Thessaloniki, Central Macedonia, Greece. It is located in the Sfageion area near the city's western entry point. The museum began operating in February 2001. It is housed in the historical building known as the Old Pump House belonging to the Thessaloniki Water Supply and Sewage Company (EYATh). This building was constructed between 1890 and 1892 by a Belgian company, as part of the campaign to modernize Thessaloniki, along with other construction projects like the railways and the gasworks, and later on the electricity company and the tram network.

The museum aims to inform the public about the history of supplying water to Thessaloniki, to demonstrate the various stages in supplying a city with water, from water catchment to water consumption, and make the public aware of issues like reducing water wastage, so that they develop environmental sensitivities, especially as far as protecting the environment and water resources is concerned.

The museum has two halls where motor-machinery and electricity generators, old electricity circuit switchboards and huge pumping units are on display. The first one used to be the boiler room and had two steam-powered units which were used to pump water from 1892 until 1929. In this hall there is a detailed display showing how steam was produced to drive the steam engines in the pump house.

In the second hall are the pumps, the first and second generation diesel engines (MAN and MIRRLEES respectively), and the BRUSH electricity generators, which were used to irrigate Thessaloniki until 1978. All the machinery is authentic, has been maintained and is in good working order. In fact, one of the machines is open at the side so that visitors can see what happens inside it when it is working.

In the rest of the building there are displays of old components, measuring instruments for the water-supply network and tools used by repair teams.

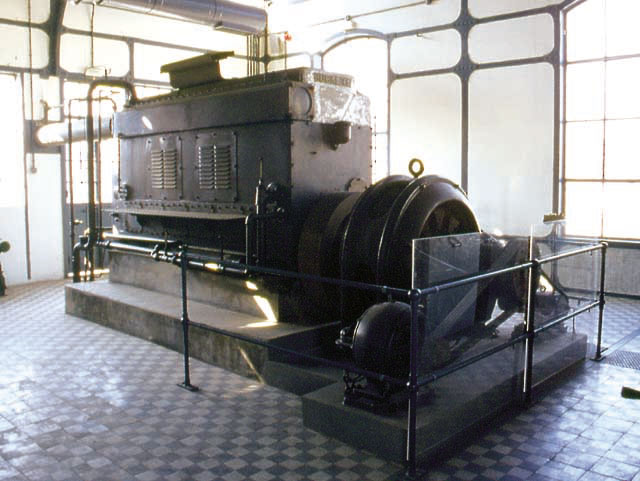
Diesel engine

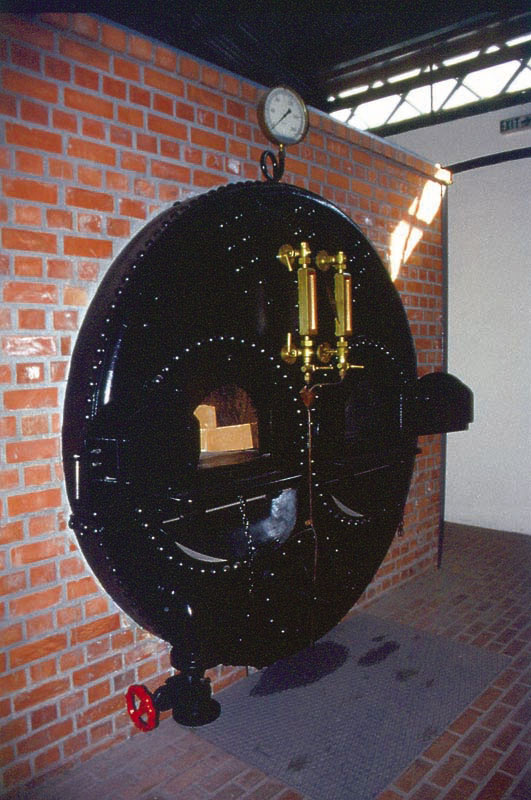
Steam tank

== Sources ==
- This article incorporates text from the corresponding article at the Museums of Macedonia website, commissioned by the Macedonian Heritage foundation, written by Vlasis Vlasidis, and published under a CC-BY-SA-3.0 license.
