= Athinais Cultural Center =

Conference complex in Athens, Greece

Coordinates: 37°56′41″N 23°38′38″E

- Interactive map of Athinais Cultural Center
- Address: Kastorias 34-36, Votanikos, Athens, 104-47
- Location: Athens, Greece

Website
- www.athinais.com.gr/polixoros/en/entrance_more.html

The Athinais Cultural Center (Greek: Αθηναΐς Πολυχώρος Πολιτισμού) is a "multi-purpose" conference complex in Athens, Greece. It hosts business events, cultural activities, and entertainment. It also contains an art gallery with a permanent exhibition of contemporary Greek art. The building was originally a silk factory, since renovated.
