= Dom Sindikata =

Building in Belgrade, Serbia

- Дом Синдиката
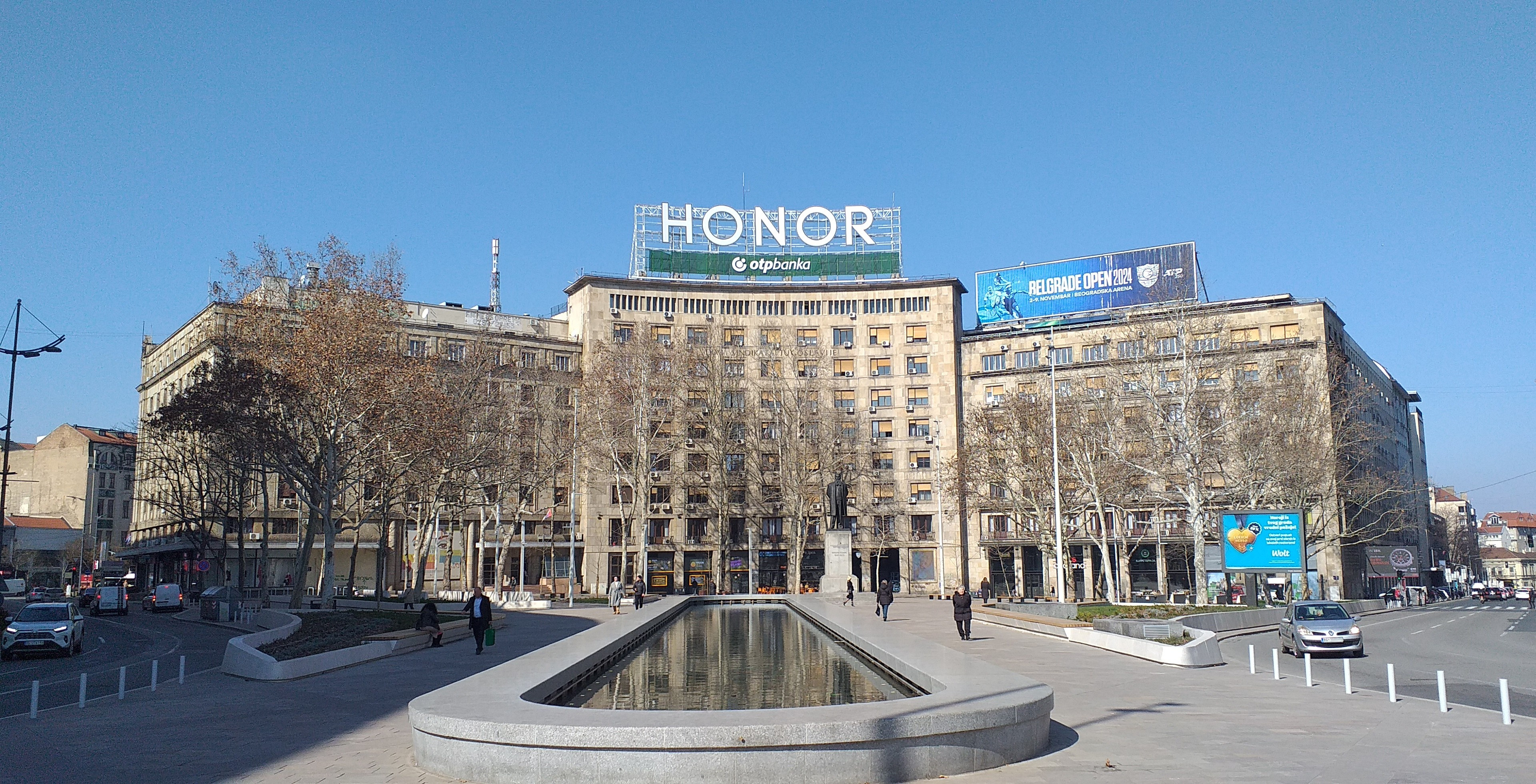
- Fountain on the Nikola Pašić Square, with Dom Sindikata behind it

- Location within Belgrade
- Alternative names: Kombank dvorana (2018-2022) mts dvorana (2022-present)

General information
- Location: Belgrade, Serbia
- Coordinates: 44.813239°N 20.462747°E
- Construction started: 1947
- Completed: 1957
- Opened: 18 November 1957; 68 years ago
- Renovated: 2017–2018

Website
- www.mtsdvorana.rs

Dom Sindikata (lit. Trade Union Hall), known as mts Hall for sponsorship reasons, is a non-residential, multi-purpose building in downtown Belgrade, the capital of Serbia. Finished in 1957, by the 1970s it became the most popular entertainment venue in the city, nicknamed the Belgrade Olympia and later was adapted into the city's first multiplex. The building was declared a cultural monument in 2013.

After the 2017–2018 reconstruction and the grand re-opening on 27 April 2018, it was officially renamed to "Kombank Hall" (Kombank dvorana). After changing a sponsor, it was renamed to "mts Hall" (mts Dvorana) on 29 April 2022.

== Location ==
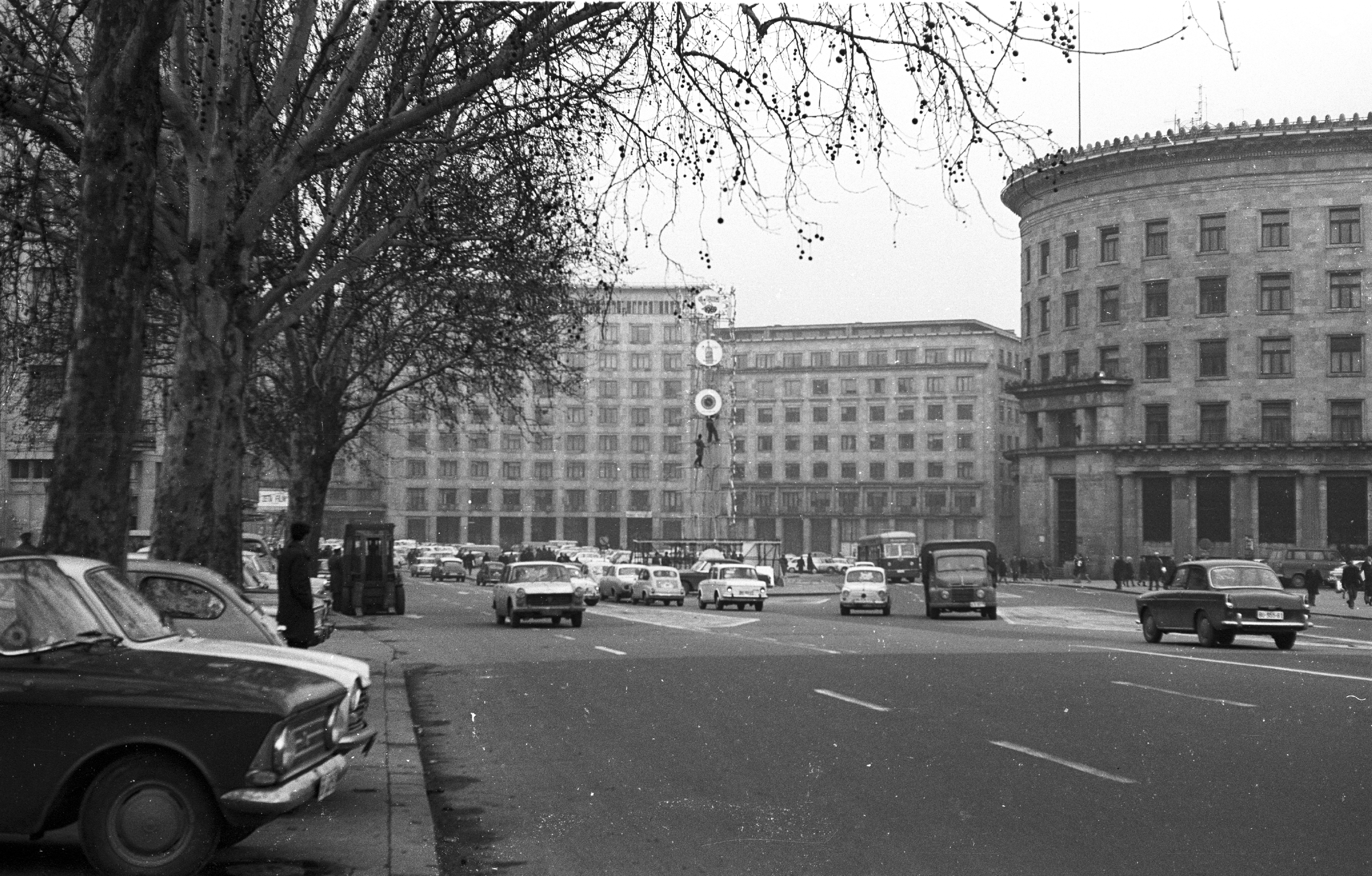
Dom Sindikata in 1968

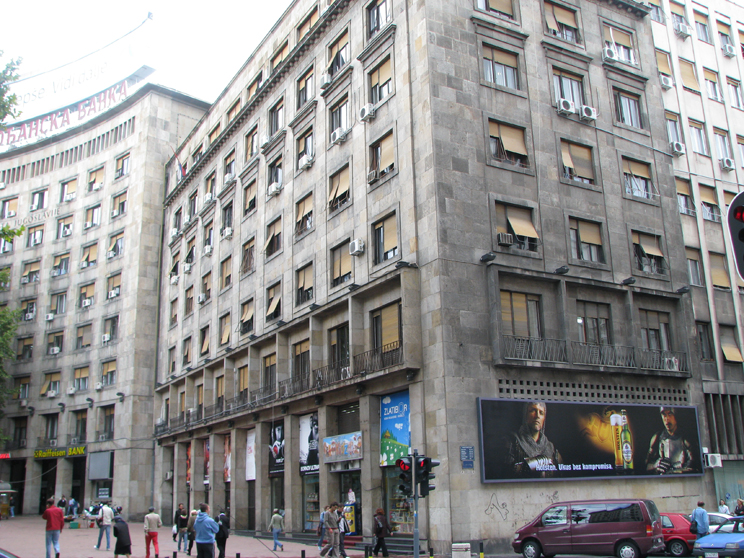
Eastern wing, view from the Dečanska street

Dom Sindikata is located on the Nikola Pašić Square, in the municipality of Stari Grad. The building marks the north and north-east border of the square. A wide passage through the building marks the entrance into the Bezistan, which is the shortest pedestrian connection with Terazije, the central city square. Terazije Theatre, McDonald's restaurant and Hotel Kasina are located in the buildings which lean on Dom Sindikata in the east. In front of the building, on the square, there is a large fountain and across the square are the Historical Museum of Serbia and the House of the National Assembly of Serbia. Western façade is located along the Dečanska street, and north of the building is an entrance into the Terazije Tunnel.

== History ==
=== Construction ===
It was projected by Branko Petričić and the construction began in 1947. Due to the Tito–Stalin split in 1948 and the ensuing Informbiro period, the works were soon halted. The construction was resumed in 1951. Since 1953, the Soviet construction workers were employed on the site. Major works on the building were completed by 1955 while the building was fully finished by the "Rad" construction company by 1957.

=== Venue ===
The opening was held on 13 June 1957. That year the first seminar was held and the first movie show was Only people by Branko Bauer. On 18 November 1957 the first musical show was held, too. The Great Hall, with 1,600 seats, became one of the central entertainment multi-purpose venues in Belgrade (concerts, shows, cinema). Conductor Mladen Jagušt stated that the hall is one of the five in Europe with the best acoustics. In the 1970s and 1980s it became a prestigious scene, Belgrade's version of Paris Olympia. Artists who performed on the stage include Olivera Katarina, Đorđe Marjanović, Arsen Dedić, Édith Piaf, Miles Davis, Ella Fitzgerald, Louis Armstrong, B.B. King, Duke Ellington, Oscar Peterson, Charles Aznavour, Robert De Niro, Elizabeth Taylor, Richard Burton, but also Arthur Rubinstein, New York Philharmonic and Berlin Philharmonic. Two folk music superstars of the day, Lepa Brena and Miroslav Ilić, held dozens of consecutive concerts.

The 1977–1978 series of matches between Boris Spassky and Viktor Korchnoi, part of the 1976-1978 world championship cycle, was held in the Dom Sindikata. The spectators were divided between two grandmasters and even fist fights occurred in front of the building. Film and music festivals which originated in the venue include FEST (from 1971 to 1977/1979 when the Sava Center was finished), "Kids fest", and "Belgrade Spring". A massive reconstruction ensued in 1978 when the interior of the entry hall was remodeled. In time it became the multiplex movie theater, with additional halls 2 (305 seats), 3 (105) and 4 (101), with the total area of 6,250 m^{2} (67,300 sq ft).

A large pipe organ was installed in 1957 and was operational until 1998. In 2017 it was estimated that the repair will cost several hundred thousands of euros. The Great Hall will remain multi-functional (concerts including symphonic orchestras, movies, and shows). Though the number of the seats will be reduced, the stage will be enlarged while the balcony and 20 loges will be kept. One of the halls will also be multi-purposed, adapted for chamber music and congresses and conferences. Large cooling equipment, today obsolete, which occupies an entire room in the basement will be surrounded by the glass walls and be accessible to the students of technical sciences. On the first floor one room at the first floors will be transformed into the city gallery and another into the children educational center. A bar will be opened in the lobby, with patio stretching outside onto the square. Inside the lobby, a panoramic elevator will be constructed. Club Promocija, which is entered from the inside passage, will be transformed into the jazz club Lisabon. The venue was re-opened on 27 April 2018 with the gala opening and was officially renamed to "Kombank Hall" (Kombank arena).

The venue has been described as an "important institution, one of the phenomenon of the second half of the 20th century". A documentary film on Dom Sindikata, Witness of the time (Svedok jednog vremena), premiered in March 2019, at the 66th Belgrade Documentary and Short Film Festival.

The "Gallery Kombank Dvorana", a permanent gallery, was opened on 5 March 2021. Inaugural exhibition presented works of painter Miloš Šobajić.

=== Company ===
The building was originally built for the Association of the Trade Unions (SSSS), hence the name. The SSSS founded the Dvorana Doma Sindikata as a separate company, which officially managed the hall. However, that company went bankrupt in 2016 and was purchased by the movie distributor company "MCF - Megacom film" which became the official leaseholder, as SSSS is still officially the owner of the facility. In July 2017 the facility was closed for the impending complete reconstruction, projected to last up to 8 months. Due to the protected status, the overall appearance has to be preserved. The unique marble floor, banisters and handrails will be repaired and with he help of the vintage photos, the "old feel" will be kept. After the reconstruction, it will have five halls with additional venues, while the Great Hall will be reduced to 1,300 seats and will still be the largest concert hall in Belgrade.

== Architecture ==
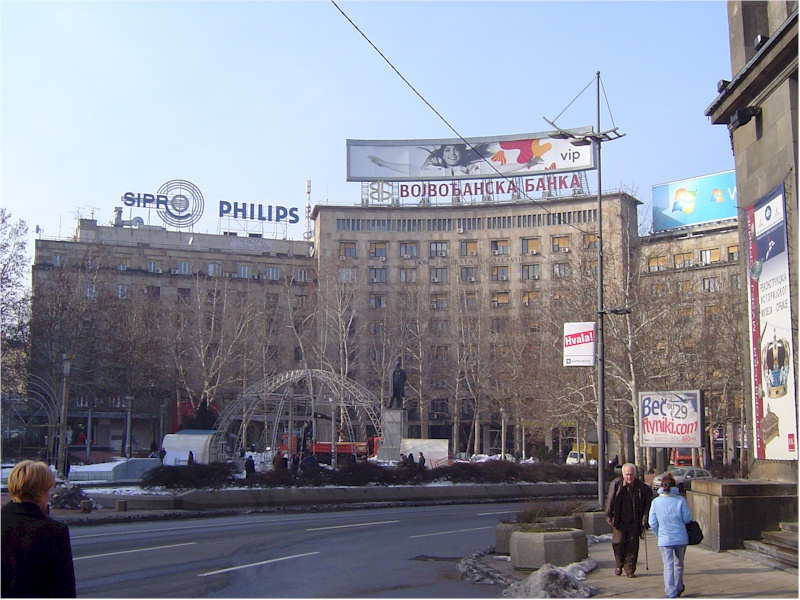
In winter

In order to make room for the "contemporary works in the style of the Socialist realism", the new urban concept of Belgrade "ruthlessly demolished all obstacles". In order to create the new, wide plateau of the square named after Marx and Engels and effectively being transformed into a parking later, several buildings were demolished.

The massive building is designed in the manner of Socialist realism, with the influences of late modernism. In terms of architecture, it is the symbol of the construction immediately after the war, and with its position and volume, it permanently set the outline of the square, which itself is one of the most important public spaces in Belgrade. Apart from architectural values, the building is important from the cultural and historical point of view, as many important political and cultural events happened in Dom Sindikata. For all that, it was declared a cultural monument in April 2013.

The original request by the authorities was for a design of a massive and strong building, fully in the manner of the Social realism, which meant no ornaments on the façade. However, architect Petričić decided to design the new building as an extension of the building of the Retirement Fund of the National Bank of the Kingdom of Yugoslavia. This building was designed by Grigorije Samojlov and was finished a couple of months prior to the outbreak of the war in 1941. The building of the Fund was ornamented with grayish-ochre stone slabs, fully designed in the Modernist style. Petričić used the same aesthetics and materials, embedding Dom Sindikata as a filling and a natural extension of the Samojlov's project. Though two separate buildings, in two slightly different styles and from different epochs, from a distance two buildings create an illusion of being just two wings of the same construction.

The Great Hall was embellished with the painting "Industrialization". It was painted by Petar Lubarda in 1959 and has a dimensions of 2.9 m × 6.5 m (9 ft 6 in × 21 ft 4 in). It is probably the largest oil painting by Lubarda, from, as the critics described it, his best period. Public uproar was caused in October 2017 when Blic newspapers reported that painting, which they estimated up to €1 million, went missing during the reconstruction. Minister for culture, Vladan Vukosavljević, and representatives of "Megacom", showed that the painting was still in the building, but was removed and protected due to the ongoing works. It was announced that it will be exhibited in the Great Hall again, after the works are finished. The process of declaring the painting a cultural property started on 5 September 2017, but it stopped at the first step as the Association of the Trade Unions, which claims the ownership, couldn't produce the proper documentation which confirms that. On 31 October 2017 the painting was officially declared a cultural property.
