= Bezistan, Belgrade =

Covered square in Belgrade, Serbia

Bezistan Безистан
- roofed square and passage
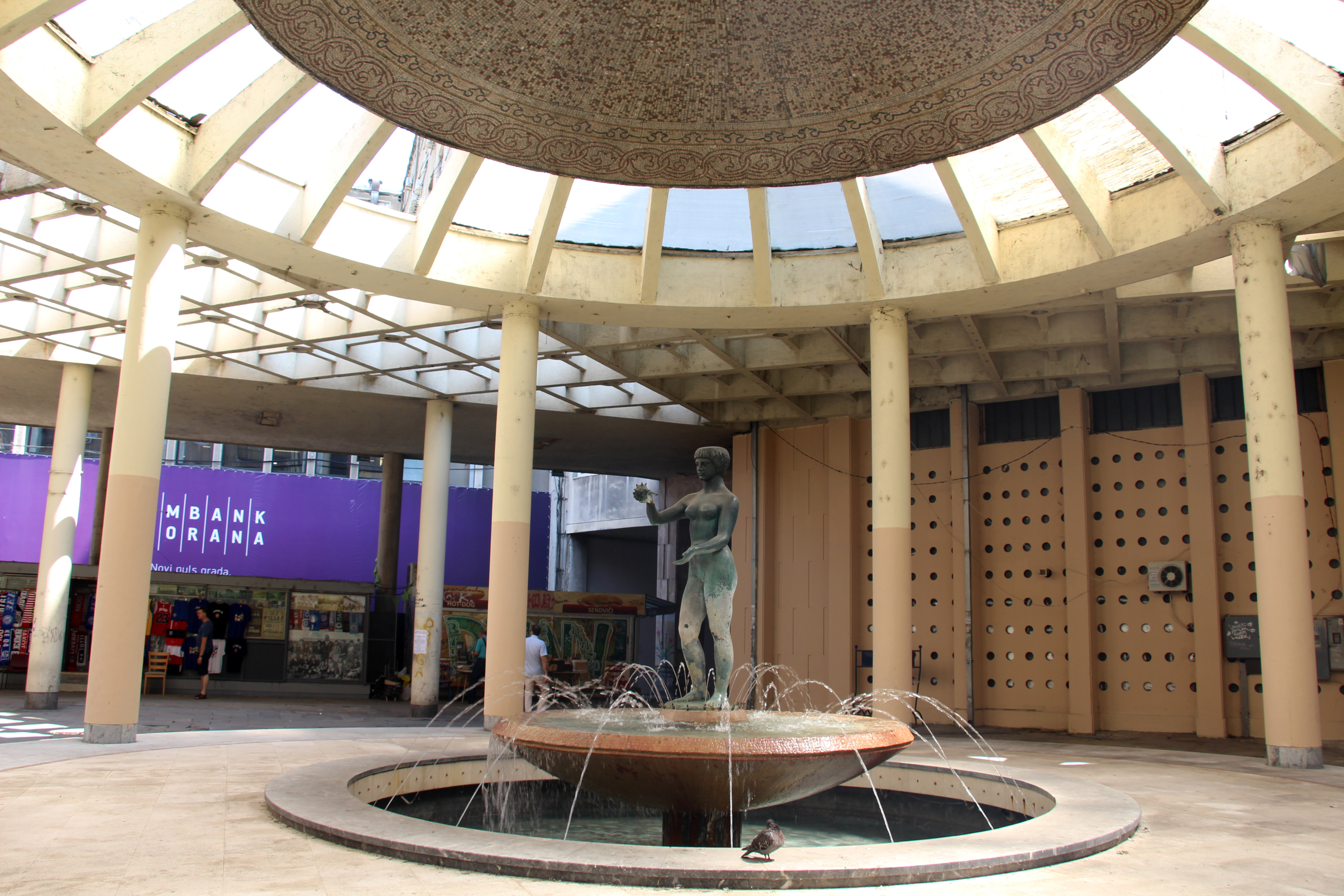
- Sculpture "Girl with the seashell", placed in 1959
- Etymology: bezistan, roofed market
- Location within Belgrade
- Coordinates: 44.813224°N 20.462090°E
- Country: Serbia
- Region: Belgrade
- Municipality: Stari Grad
- Established: 1953

Area
  - Total: 1.37 ha (3.4 acres)

Bezistan (Serbian Cyrillic: Безистан) is a roofed square and indoor passage in downtown Belgrade, Serbia that was designed by Vladeta Maksimović in 1953. It connects Terazije and Nikola Pašić squares with the surrounding shopping area. Bezistan is on the site of former Hotel Pariz.

Nicknamed by architects as the "belly button of Belgrade", Bezistan has been placed under preliminary protection as a potential cultural monument. It is already part of the Spatial Cultural-Historical Unit of Stari Grad.

== Location and description ==
Bezistan belongs to the municipality of Stari Grad. It covers an area of 13,667 m^{2} (147,110 sq ft). Venues along the outer sides of the passage include the former Hotel Kasina, Terazije Theatre, Dom Sindikata with its large hall and multiplex cinema, and the pedestrian Nikola Pašić Square with a fountain. On the other side, there is an exit through the northern corner of Nikola Pašić Square. There is also an entrance/exit between the two wings of the Dom Sindikata.

== History ==
=== Hotel Pariz ===
In the 1830s, Anđelko Aleksić Ćosa operated the Ćosina Mehana tavern on the site that would become the Bezistan. He started constructing a hotel in 1868. Ćosa's Hotel Pari opened in 1870 in a row of new hotels in Terazije (downtown square). The hotel's façade was 25 metres (82 ft) wide. It just had thirty rooms, but they were of the highest category, giving it the nickname "Grand Hotel Pariz" (Grand Hotel Paris). The fancy venue was known for cleanliness, cuisine, parties, and receptions

The hotel became a major meeting place for the upper class and the senior members of the People's Radical Party. Foreign guests who stayed at the hotel include Mikhail Chernyayev and Vlaho Bukovac. The most popular spot was the hotel's spacious kafana (café), with a heavily shaded, sprawling inner yard that was bordered on two sides by the hotel's wings.

In 1906, the hotel's owner, Svetozar Botorić, had a movie projector installed in the hotel's hall. This became Belgrade's first permanent cinema called Grand" Botorić. The first Serbian feature film, The Life and Deeds of the Immortal Leader Karađorđe, was partially filmed in the venue and later shown there.

Botorić died in Austro-Hungarian internment during World War I. After the war, his widow sold the hotel to the Funds Administration, but its ownership changed several times. In the 1930s, the building was expanded with another cinema hall. When Belgrade's Terazije was bombed during World War II, the hotel was badly damaged. Its remains were demolished during the large-scale reconstruction of the Terazije in 1948.

=== Bezistan ===
During the interwar period, city decided to connecting the Terazije with a new square that would be constructed in front of the National Assembly. Construction of the Marx and Engels Square (now Nikola Pašić Square) took place between 1947 and 1957. Trees from the former hotel's yard were removed for the project. In 1953, Vladeta Maksimović designed Bezistan for this location. It was envisioned as a small, roofed square that would be a cultural and tourist area with artisan and merchant shops.

The small shops were placed in rows along the edges of the area, including the Soko Štark's confectionery store. The covered square became a quiet corner in downtown, with mini gardens and coffee shops. It was a popular destination for many Belgraders. In 1959, a round plateau with a fountain was added; it featured the bronze sculpture, "Girl with the Seashell", by Aleksandar Zarin. To cover the plateau and foundation, Maksimović designed a concrete webbed roof, shaped like a semi-opened dome. Because of that feature and the small shops located in it, the area was named Bezistan; although it never functioned as the bezistan or traditional covered market.

Small, prefabricated kiosks were added to the area for souvenir shops, along with the city's first photo booth. The cinema Kozara replaced the former Grand cinema, becoming a major feature within Bezistan. For decades, illegal vendors scalped movie tickets and sold pumpkin and sunflower seeds, popcorn, and sweets in front of the Kozara.

In the 1980s, the disco club, Bezistan, opened in the basement of a building in the district. It was the only "dancing club" in the city. When the popularity of the Italo disco reached Belgrade, the club organized dance competitions for participants from Yugoslavia. The band Zana was promoted there, and the band Aska used the venue to practice its choreography for the 1982 Eurovision Song Contest. The disco was closed in 1989 and was replaced by a McDonald's restaurant. Although it is officially located at Terazije's No. 27 with the main entrance on the square, McDonald's named its restaurant "Bezistan".

In time, candy and souvenir shops developed on one side of the passage, while the modernistic section on the other side included McDonald's, a coffee shop, and Reiffeisen Bank. With the economic collapse in the 1990s, many shops in Bezistan closed. The passage became known for shops selling button badges, personalized shirts, and pirated music and films. Bezistan was also known for illegal foreign currency dealers.

=== 21st century ===
The fountain stopped working and the Bezistan looked like a neglected, empty passage. Cinema Kozara closed in 2003; it was purchased by Croatian tycoon Ivica Todorić but was never developed before it was destroyed by a fire on 25 May 2012.

The city planned revitalization for Bezistan in the second half of 2008, but the only completed work was the reconstruction of the plateau and the repair of the fountain in 2011, New reconstruction plans were announced in April 2017, followed by a series of delays. The 2018 design by Andzor Inženjering included new paving and the reintroduction of the plants. The cost of this project was estimated at 71 million dinars (€600,000).

However, Inženjering's design was not implemented, and part of the concrete ceiling collapsed in May 2019. Once again, the city promised to renovate Bezistan. In January 2020, Bezistan became part of the protected Terazije cultural-historical unit. In February 2020, the city announced that the renovation was not proceeding because problems with the title on part of the land on with it is located. In August 2022, the city announced plans to turn Bezistan into an art gallery, but the reconstruction remained "nowhere in sight".

Further problem became the illegal usage of Bezistan as a parking lot, despite being a pedestrian zone, and not even easily accessed by cars. The vehicles are obstructing the passage and further break and crumble the paving. Despite constant reports on the social media and in the news, city's communal police reported that citizens made "only three reports" on illegal parking in 2022, despite the fact that citizens are not obliged to report it, while the communal police are patrolling the area every day.

== Čavketov Pasaž ==
There is a separate section that forks from Bezistan at the entrance to the Nikola Pašić Square, along the western wall of the Dom Sindikata building. It connects to Nušićeva Street. This section developed into an artistic, open-air gallery, with exhibition panels on the walls of the surrounding buildings. The gallery became known as the Street Gallery (ulična galerija).

In May 2012, a group of artists organized a photography exhibition with images of rock musicians and the antiwar activist Goran Čavajda Čavke. The artists proposed that the passage should be named after Čavke. The city accepted the proposal in January 2013, and the passage was named Čavketov Pasaž ("Čavke's Passage").

In late 2022, the city announced renovation plans for the upper section of Nušićeva Street, along with the entry section of Čavketov Pasaž.
