= Archaeological Museum of Serres =

Museum in Serres, Greece

Coordinates: 41.0906°N 23.5496°E

- Αρχαιολογικό Μουσείο Σερρών
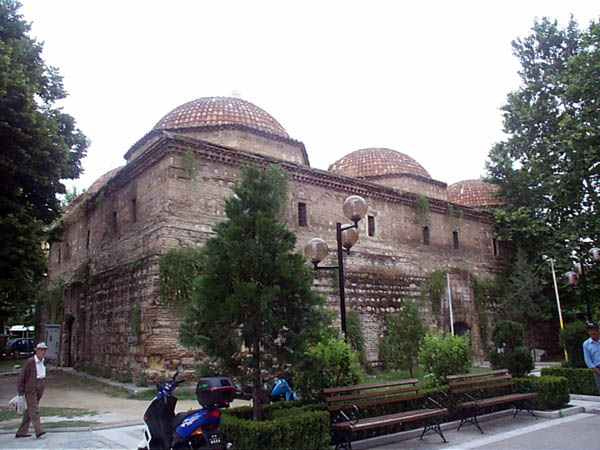
- Established: 1968
- Location: Serres
- Type: Archaeological Museum
- Website: archaeologicalmuseums.gr/en/museum/5df34af3deca5e2d79e8c1b4/archaeological-museum-of-serres

The Archaeological Museum of Serres (Greek: Αρχαιολογικό Μουσείο Σερρών) is located in the old centre of Serres, a city in Central Macedonia, Greece. It is housed in the city's Ottoman-era bedesten (Μπεζεστένι) a fifteenth-century building in Eleftherias Square.

== Building ==
The bedesten is an enclosed and covered market. The Serres bedesten was built by Çandarlı Ibrahim Pasha the Younger around 1493/94.

According to the historian of Ottoman art Semavi Eyice, the Serres bedesten is among the most remarkable specimens of the building type for its excellent construction technique and its striking exterior. It is a rectangular single-storey structure with dimensions 21 by 31 metres (69 ft × 102 ft), divided into six sections by arches, each section topped by a dome, covered by tiles instead of lead.

== Exhibits ==
The building now functions as an archaeological museum. More specifically, there are prehistoric exhibits from the excavations at Promachonas and Kryoneri, Archaic, Classical, Hellenistic and Roman exhibits (mainly ceramics, statues, and inscriptions) from Argilos, Vergi, Terpni, Neos Skopos, Gazoros, ancient Tragilos, and Serres. Particularly important are the Early Christian and Byzantine exhibits from the town of Serres, most notably a marble icon of Christ and a twelfth-century mosaic of St Andrew the Apostle, both from the Old Cathedral.

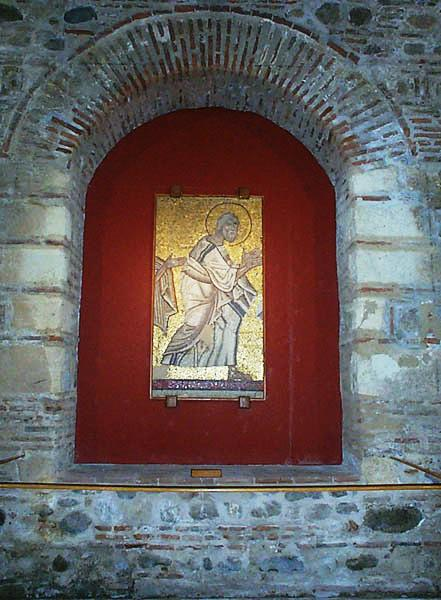
Andrew the Apostle

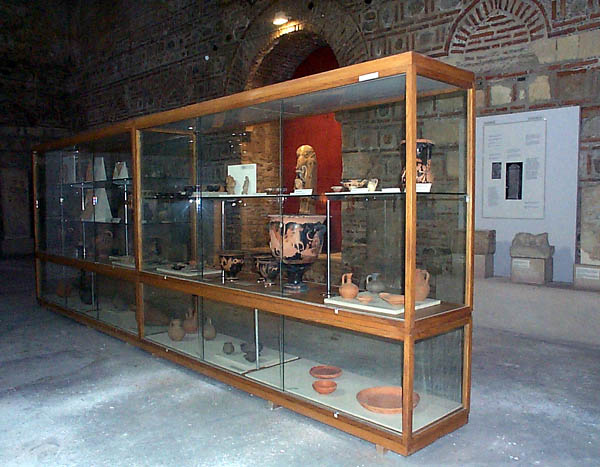
Exhibits from Bisaltia region

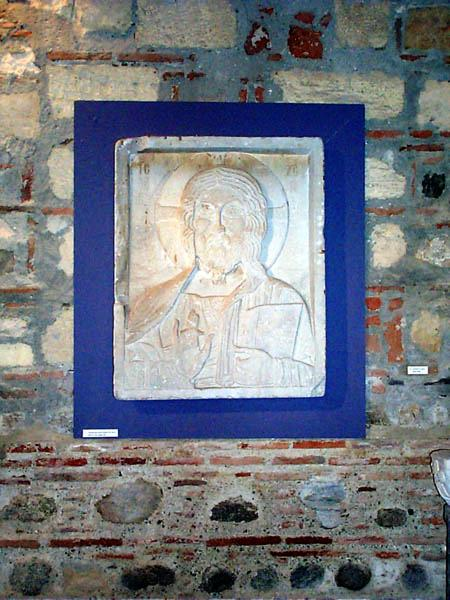
Marble icon of Christ

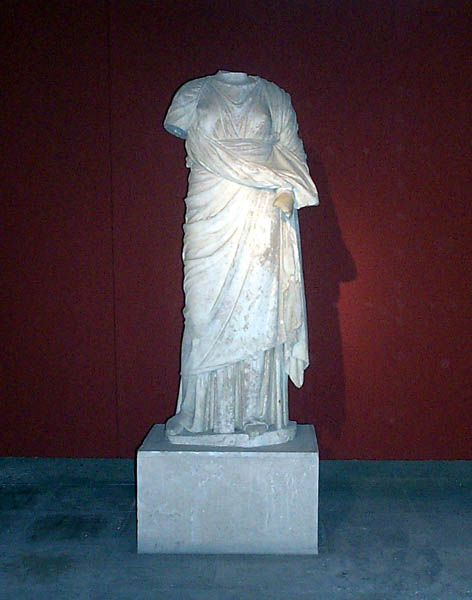
Statue of a woman
