= Nikola Pašić Square =

Square in Belgrade, Serbia

- Трг Николе Пашића
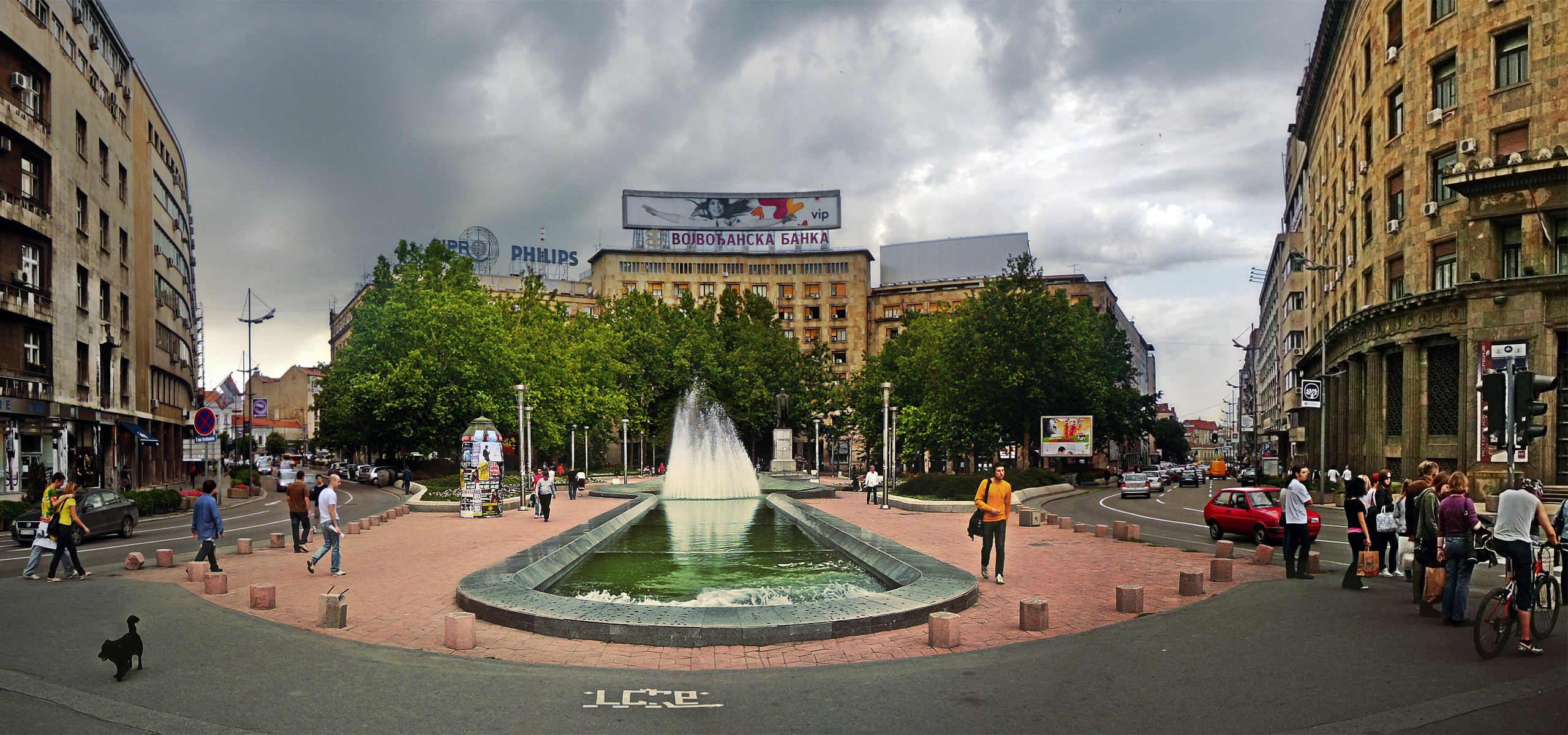
- Nikola Pašić Square in June 2009.
- Location: Stari Grad, Belgrade, Serbia
- Location within Belgrade
- Interactive map of Nikola Pašić Square
- Coordinates: 44°48′45.7″N 20°27′46.6″E

The Nikola Pašić Square (Serbian: Трг Николе Пашића, Trg Nikole Pašića) is one of the central town squares and an urban neighborhoods of Belgrade, the capital of Serbia. The square is named after Nikola Pašić who served as mayor of Belgrade, prime minister of Serbia and prime minister of Yugoslavia. Until 1992 the square was named the Marx and Engels Square (Serbian: Трг Маркса и Енгелса, Trg Marksa i Engelsa).

== Location ==
Located in the municipality of Stari Grad, Nikola Pašić Square lies in downtown Belgrade as the direct extension of Terazije. Named after Nikola Pašić, Serbia's famous early 20th-century politician and prime minister, it overlooks the monumental building of the House of the National Assembly and itself extends into urban Belgrade's longest street, Bulevar kralja Aleksandra, while Dečanska Street connects it to the Republic Square.

== History ==
At the corner of Bulevar Kralja Aleksandra and Dečanska Street, near the former "Topola" kafana, the first gas station in Belgrade was open. It was located on the spot close to the modern fountain, where the jardinières facing the National Assembly are situated today.

In order to make room for the "contemporary works in the style of the Socialist realism", the new urban concept of Belgrade after 1945 "ruthlessly demolished all obstacles". In order to create the new, wide plateau of the square named after Marx and Engels and effectively being transformed into a parking later, several buildings were demolished prior to te beginning of the construction of Dom Sindikata in 1947.

The square was built during the 1950s as part of a massive Terazije reorganization project. Inaugurated as the Marx and Engels Square in honour of the famous communist theoreticians, its original terrain was so hilly that much earth had to be removed in order to make its construction possible. A designing concept from the 1950s, work of Hranislav Stojanović, envisioned a fan-shaped pedestrian plateau with a tall monument dedicated to Marx and Engels, which would reflect in an elongated cascade pool-fountain. The fountain was built in 1959, but the monument hasn't.

In 1961, not far from the fountain, an obelisk was placed. It was embellished with neon lights and was commemorating the first summit of the Non-Aligned Movement held in Belgrade that year. The obelisk turned out to be a temporary one, as it was removed some time after the summit ended. The plateau was paved with the red granite slabs and while marble slabs which formed stripes. For the first two decades the plateau wasn't easily accessible for the pedestrians as it was used as an unofficial parking lot.

In March 1970, city announced construction of three underground garages below the square, with 500 parking spaces each. They were designed by architect Stojan Maksimović. One was planned below the modern fountain plateau, another one was to be below the Vlajkovićeva Street, next to the parliament building, while the third was planned on the location of the Pioneer's Park. Works on the one below the plateau were to start in the second half of the year. The garage in Vlajkovićeva was also to have a circular, above the ground, multi-level parking lot. These two garages were to be connected underground. In the end, only the garage below the Pioneer's Park was finished, and even that was only in 2005.

In the 1970s, city administration decided to remodel the square and make it more pedestrian friendly. Various ideas were given, including the creation of a hillock. Still, nothing has been done until the 1980s. On the initiative of Đoko Vještica, famous Belgrade radio host, the greenery was planted on the square, including the plane trees. The square was re-paved with the six-squared concrete slabs and the fountain was remodeled in 1987, too.

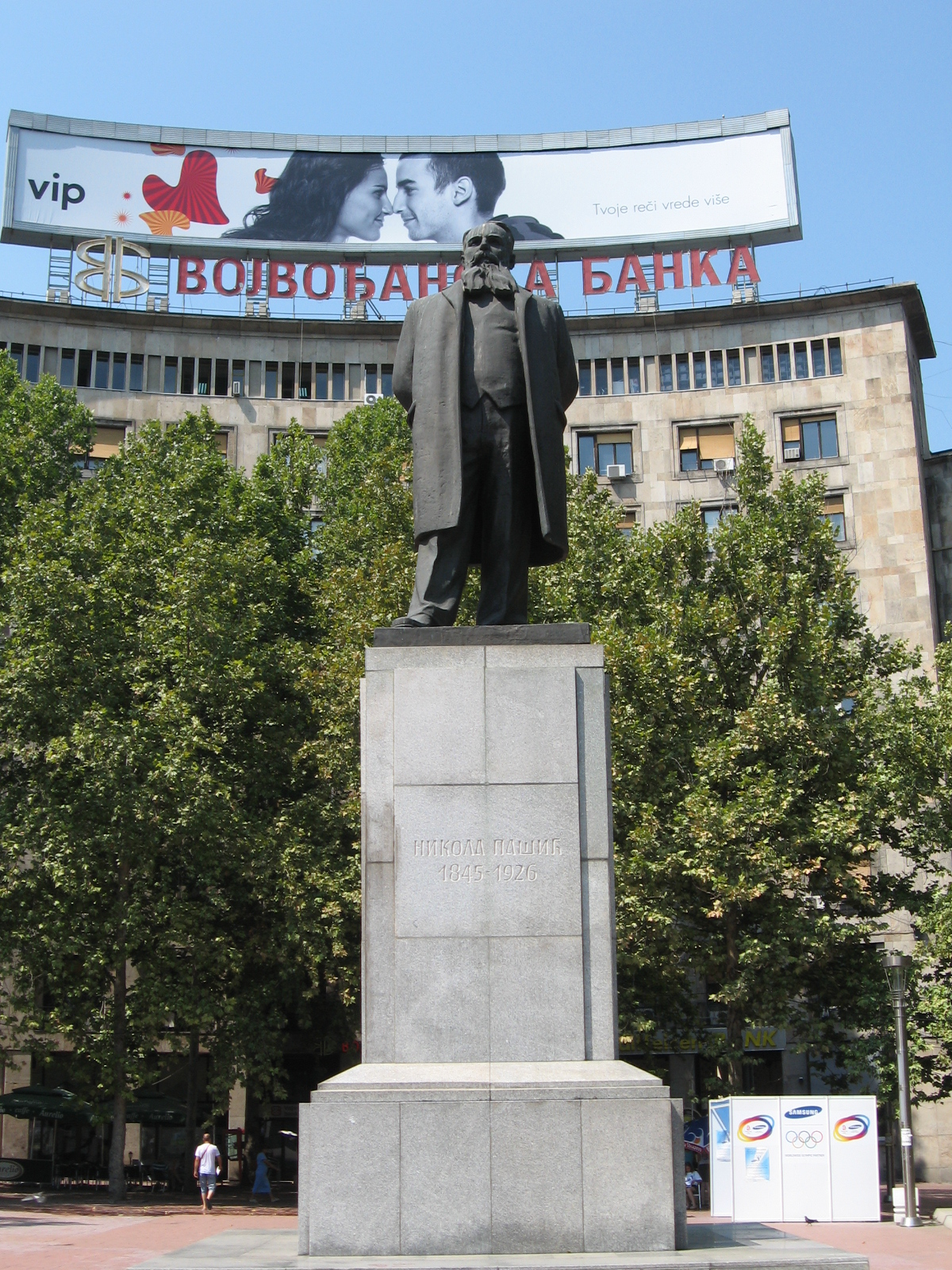
Nikola Pašić statue

Subsequently, in the early 1990s, it was one of the Belgrade's first toponyms to change its name with the ending of the era of Socialist Yugoslavia. It was renamed from the Marx and Engels Square to the Nikola Pašić Square in 1992. A monument to Nikola Pašić was erected in 1998. When the statue was to be erected, ideas of bringing back the earth to the square in order to create an artificial hillock as a pedestal for the monument reappeared, but were again ultimately abandoned.

In 2015, city organized design competition for three central squares, Republic Square, Terazije and Nikola Pašić Square. Design by Zorica Savičić and Zoran Dmitrović was selected. In 2017, city government announced reconstruction of the square which would include the demolition of the fountain and construction of a new, smaller one. In August 2020 city confirmed that the works may start in 2021. The design, especially the handling of its central piece, the fountain, met with negative public reactions so the city confirmed that the fountain will remain the same. City then announced that the fountain will be redesigned, but it will remain a classical fountain, though by August 2022 it became evident that reconstruction will not start before 2023, later rescheduled for the end of summer of 2023. The architects continued to insist on reduction of the fountain, and also asked for the Pašić's monument to be repositioned.

This project also included reconstruction of the area in front of the assembly building. The "lavish fountain" was planned for the plateau along the boulevard, while the cars should move underground, as the idea of an underground garage in the Vlajkovićeva Street was revived. Start was planned for 2016. Instead, only re-paving of the plateau began in October 2021, and was to be finished by February 2022, but the renovation dragged on. Public debate on arranging the area continued, with some supporting the present, open for all status, while other suggested former solution by Nikolay Krasnov, which included avenue, decorative iron fence, gates and sentry boxes. This appearance was dismantled in the mid-20th century.

City continued to push the reconstruction of the square, officially searching for the contractor in October 2023. Total projection of the cost was raised to 854 million dinars (7,2 million) in the span of three years.

== Characteristics ==
The dominant architectural features in the square are the massive "Dom sindikata" building and one of the Belgrade's largest fountains. Museum of Yugoslav History is located across the fountain. Adjacent to the square is the Pioneers Park as well as the buildings of the Belgrade City Hall and the Presidency of the Republic. The pedestrian section of the square is used for various public events, most notably open flower, honey, and book sales. On occasion, artificial ice rink or beach volley sand courts are put up as seasonal attractions in winter and summer, respectively.

Total plateau area of the square covers 8,752 m^{2} (94,210 sq ft).

== Features ==
=== Dom Sindikata ===
Dom Sindikata ("Trade Union Hall") is a massive building, built in the style of Socialist realism. It was projected by Branko Petričić and the construction began in 1947. It was finished by the Russian construction workers from 1953 to 1957. That year the first seminar was held and on 18 November 1957 the first musical show. The Great Hall with 1,600 seats, became one of the central entertainment multi-purpose venues in Belgrade (concerts, shows, cinema). Conductor Mladen Jagušt stated that the hall is one of the five in Europe with the best acoustics. In the 1970s and 1980s it became a prestigious scene, Belgrade's version of Paris Olympia. A massive reconstruction ensued in 1978 when the interior of the entry hall was remodeled. In time it became the multiplex, with additional halls 2 (305 seats), 3 (105) and 4 (101), with the total area of 6,250 m^{2} (67,300 sq ft). In 2013 the building was declared a cultural monument. In July 2017 the facility was closed for the impending complete reconstruction, projected to last up to 8 months. Due to the protected status, the overall appearance has to be preserved. The unique marble floor, banisters and handrails will be repaired and with he help of the vintage photos, the "old feel" will be kept. After the reconstruction, it will have five halls with additional venues, while the Great Hall will be reduced to 1,300 seats and will still be the largest concert hall in Belgrade.

The building is designed in the manner of socialist realism, with the influences of the late modernism. In terms of architecture, it is the symbol of the construction immediately after the war, and with its position and volume, it permanently set the outline of the square, which itself is one of the most important public spaces in Belgrade. Apart from architectural values, the building is important from the cultural and historical point of view, as many important political and cultural events happened in Dom Sindikata. For all that, it was declared a cultural monument in April 2013.

=== Bezistan ===
Bezistan is a shopping area in an indoor passage which connects Terazije and the Square of Nikola Pašić. Originally, it was a location of Hotel "Pariz", which was built in 1870 and demolished in 1948 during the reconstruction of Terazije. Passage has been protected by the state as a "cultural property", though still under the "preliminary protection", and was nicknamed by the architects as the "belly button of Belgrade". It is part of the wider protected Spatial Cultural-Historical Unit of Stari Grad.

Since the 1950s, the covered square was a quiet corner in sole downtown, with mini gardens and coffee shops and a popular destination of many Belgraders, but in the recent decades mainly lost that function. In 1959 a round plateau with the fountain and a bronze sculpture, called “Girl with the seashell”, sculptured by Aleksandar Zarin, was built. A webbed roof, shaped like a semi-opened dome, made of concrete and projected by Vladeta Maksimović, was constructed to cover the plateau and the fountain. Because of that feature, and a small shops located in it, it was named "Bezistan", though it never functioned as the bezistan in its true, oriental sense of the term. Revitalization and reconstruction was projected for the second half of 2008, but the only work that has been done was the reconstruction of the plateau and the fountain in 2011.

A popular disco club "Bezistan" was opened in the 1980s. It was located in the basement of the venue which was later adapted into the McDonald restaurant. It was different from other discos of the era, and was the only "dancing club" in the city. When the popularity of the Italo disco reached Belgrade, the club organized dance competitions for participant from the entire Yugoslavia. Band Zana was promoted for the first time here, while band Aska practiced its choreography for their performance at the 1982 Eurovision song contest. The venue was closed in 1989.

Bezistan covers an area of 13,667 m^{2} (147,110 sq ft). The major feature within Bezistan was the "Kozara" cinema, one of the most popular in Belgrade for decades. It was closed in 2003, purchased by Croatian tycoon Ivica Todorić and allegedly planned as a supermarket for Todorić's Serbian brand "Idea" before it was destroyed by fire on 25 May 2012 It has been left in that condition ever since. Bezistan had candy and souvenir shops on one side, and modernistic section on other side, with McDonald's restaurant, modern coffee shop and "Reiffeisen bank", but as of 2018 it looks like nothing more than a neglected, empty passage. New possible reconstruction was announced in April 2017, followed by a series of postponing: for October 2017, January, March and May 2018. The project includes new paving of the area and reintroduction of the greenery. Nothing has been done, though, and in May 2019 part of the concrete ceiling collapsed so the city again promised to renovate the passage, sometime in 2019.

=== Fountain ===
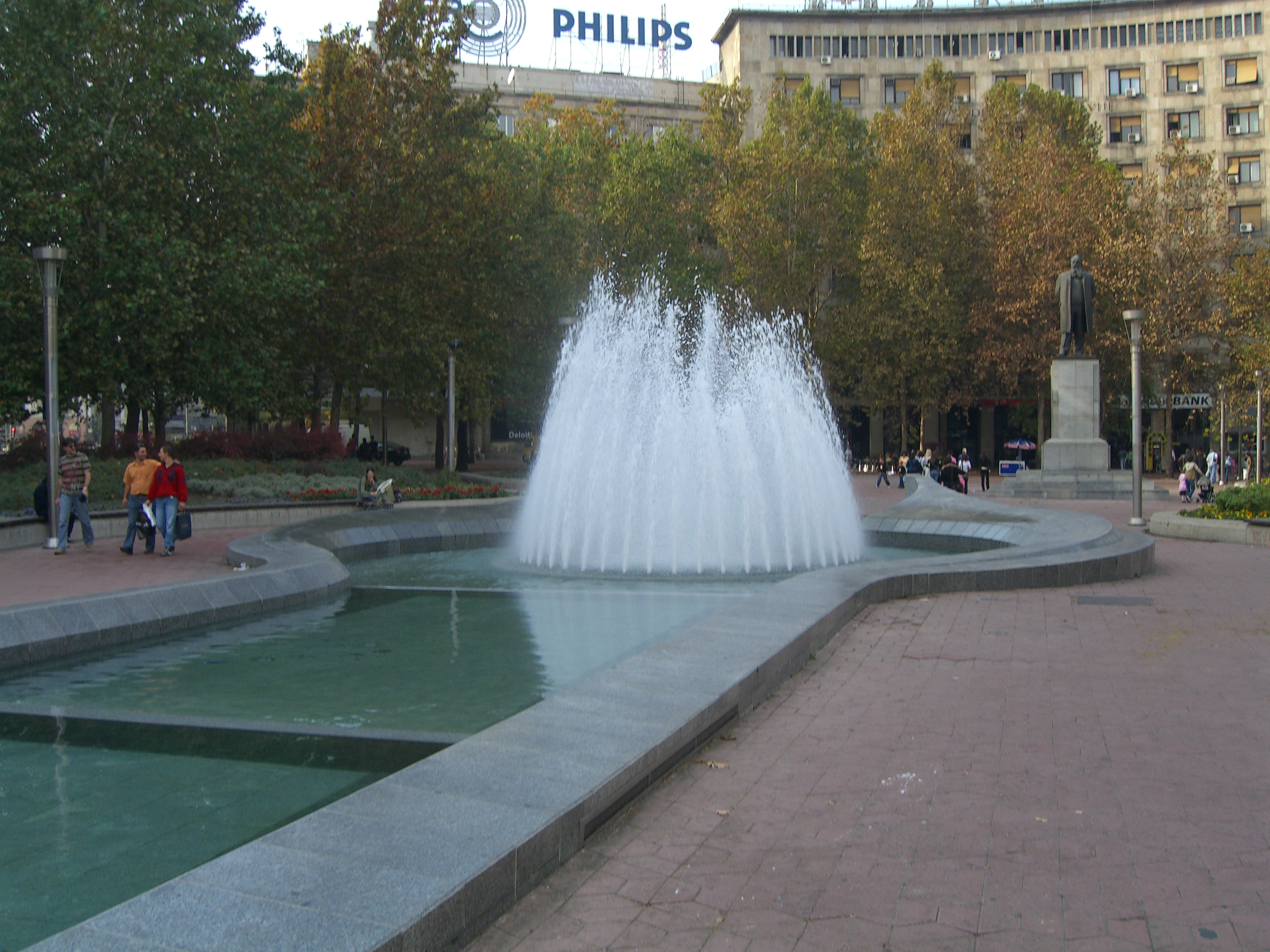
Fountain at the square

The original fountain was built in 1959. It was designed by Hranislav Stojanović. The fountain was remodeled in 1987. It was reconstructed in the shape of an artificial cascade stream, with "spring" in the section close to the parliament building, and the "mouth" in the newly added section of the high jetted water. There are also two drinking fountains at the head of the fountain.

The fountain became one of the symbols of Belgrade, featured in numerous music and promotional videos and printed on the post cards, especially using the angle with the parliament building behind the fountain. In time, a custom of graduation celebrations developed around it. Every year, graduate students from both the elementary and secondary schools, celebrate the last day of school by jumping dressed into the fountain.

In 2017, city government announced that, within the scopes of the reconstruction of the square, it will demolish the fountain and build a new, smaller one, with the sprinklers on the ground level. Demolition of "one of the most recognizable city fountains" prompted a public opposition to the project. Chief city urbanist Marko Stojčič stated in July 2019 that the fountain is not envisioned by the new project at all, adding that he will "insist to keep water in some form". In August 2019, deputy mayor Andreja Mladenović said that the fountain will not be removed, not specifying if the old one will be kept or the new one will be built instead. As the opposition among the citizens continued, Stojčić stated that the new fountain will be similar to the existing one "to the extreme degree". Political opposition in the city hall, threatened to physically prevent the works in the square if the fountain is to be removed.

In August 2020, city confirmed that the fountain will keep its location and appearance, and that only its rim could be modernized. City also wanted to make the fountain operational during the winter, too, but the architects who designed the project were against it. Architect Savičić, co-designer, accepted that their proposal for the ground fountain will be dropped, but suggested that the fountain should at least be reduced to its 1987 size.

== Birds ==
The square's open space attracts various bird species, among them: feral pigeon, house sparrow, hooded crow, European kestrel, and common swift. Furthermore, walking around the square, it is possible to hear great tit and woodpigeon sounds emanating from the nearby Pionirski Park. Large gulls regularly fly over the square at higher altitude.

== Gathering spot ==
=== 1982 Palestinian solidarity rally ===
On 9 July 1982, the square, then named after Marx and Engels, was the site of a Palestinian solidarity rally. Named "Solidarity with the Struggle of the Palestinian People" and held under the 'Death to fascism, freedom to the people' slogan, the event was Yugoslav youth's protest against Israel's invasion of Lebanon as well as the Israeli siege of Beirut. Organized by the Yugoslav Socialist Youth League (SSOJ), youth wing of SFR Yugoslavia's ruling political party—the Yugoslav Communist League (SKJ), the rally was held in front of 30,000 people. It featured speeches from the Yugoslav People's Army (JNA) general-lieutenant and Order of the People's Hero holder Dušan Korać as well as the Palestine Liberation Organization (PLO) representative in Yugoslavia, Mohammed Nabhan. It also saw musical performances by Riblja Čorba, Električni Orgazam, Radomir "Točak" Mihailović, and Aki Rahimovski.

A group of Yugoslav liberal dissidents used the rally to protest against the regime and were arrested. They carried the banner of Solidarity, the Polish labor union and an anti-authoritarian social movement.

=== 1984 Maj Rok ===
On 25 May 1984—Marshal Tito's "birthday", known in SFR Yugoslavia as the Day of Youth—the square saw a large open-air rock concert the admission for which was free of charge. Twelve Yugoslav rock acts took the stage in front of reportedly 90,000 spectators. The acts that participated in order of appearance were: Delta 9, Beta Kentauri, Dorian Gray, U Škripcu, Električni Orgazam, Film, Divlje Jagode, Zabranjeno Pušenje, Dʼ Boys, Disciplina Kičme, Kerber, and Drugi Način.

=== 1986 Maj Rok ===
On 24 May 1986, another Day of Youth celebration was scheduled for the Marx and Engels Square with a multitude of Yugoslav rock acts booked and over 100,000 in attendance. However, the concert got interrupted early on when a huge downpour began and began to endanger the safety of the gathered crowd.

The event was moved for 6 September 1986. And even though the rain fell again, this time the celebration was held in full.
