= Bedesten =

Type of commercial structure in Ottoman architecture

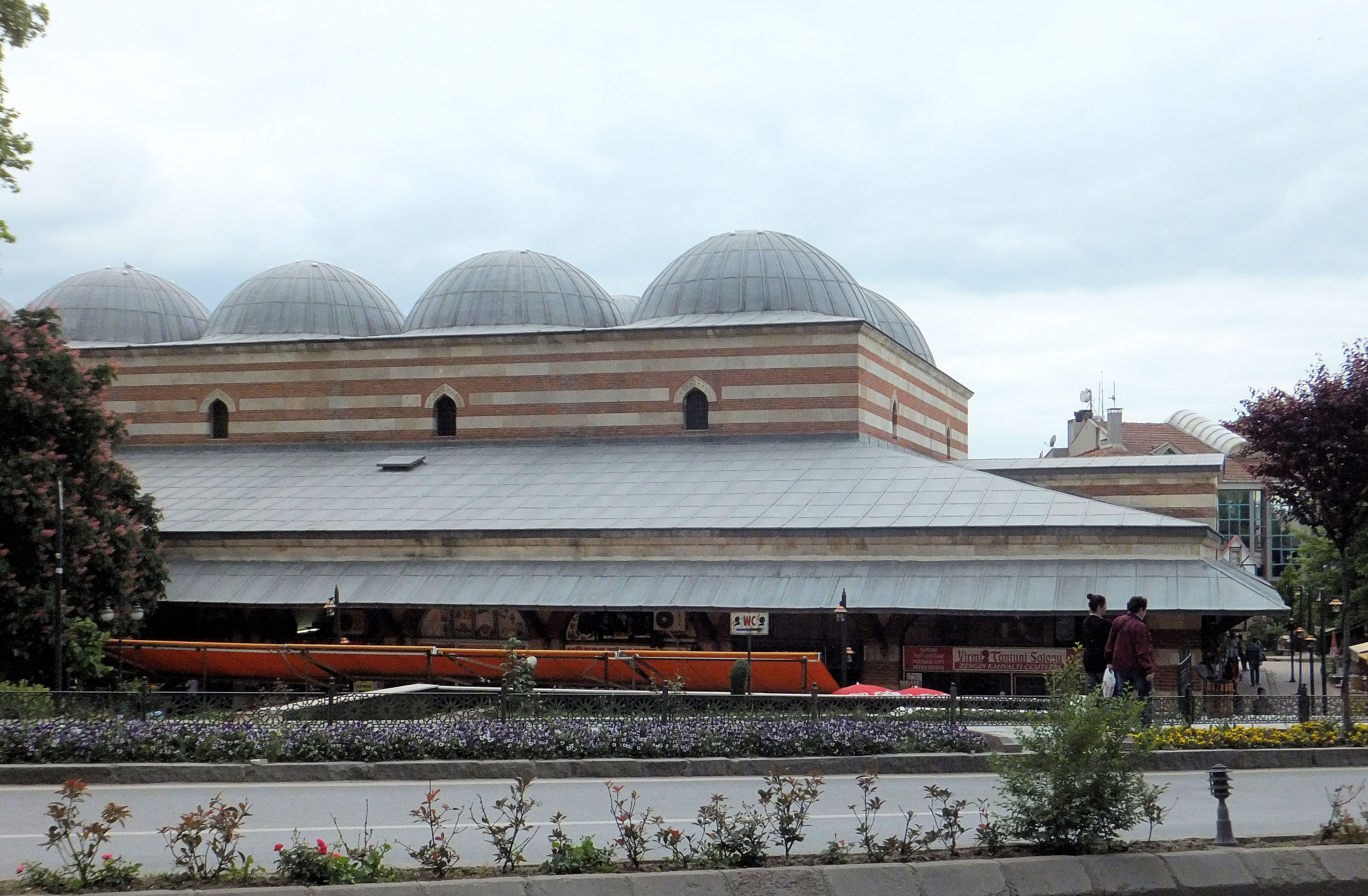
Exterior view of the Bedesten of Edirne, Turkey, built by Sultan Mehmed I between 1413 and 1421 CE

A bedesten (variants: bezistan, bezisten, bedestan) is a type of covered market or market hall which was historically found in the cities of the Ottoman Empire. It was typically the central building of the commercial district of an Ottoman town or city, where the most important and precious goods (like gold and jewellery) were kept and sold. Its function was comparable or equivalent to that of a qaysariyya in other (usually Arabic-speaking) regions, though the architecture of the latter could be different and be similar to that of a bazaar with its own streets.

== Etymology ==
The origin of the word is from Persian بزازستان bazzāzestān, which means 'place of drapers'. The word includes Persian suffix -istan. Ottomans pronounced it as Bazzistan and Bedesten.

== History and function ==
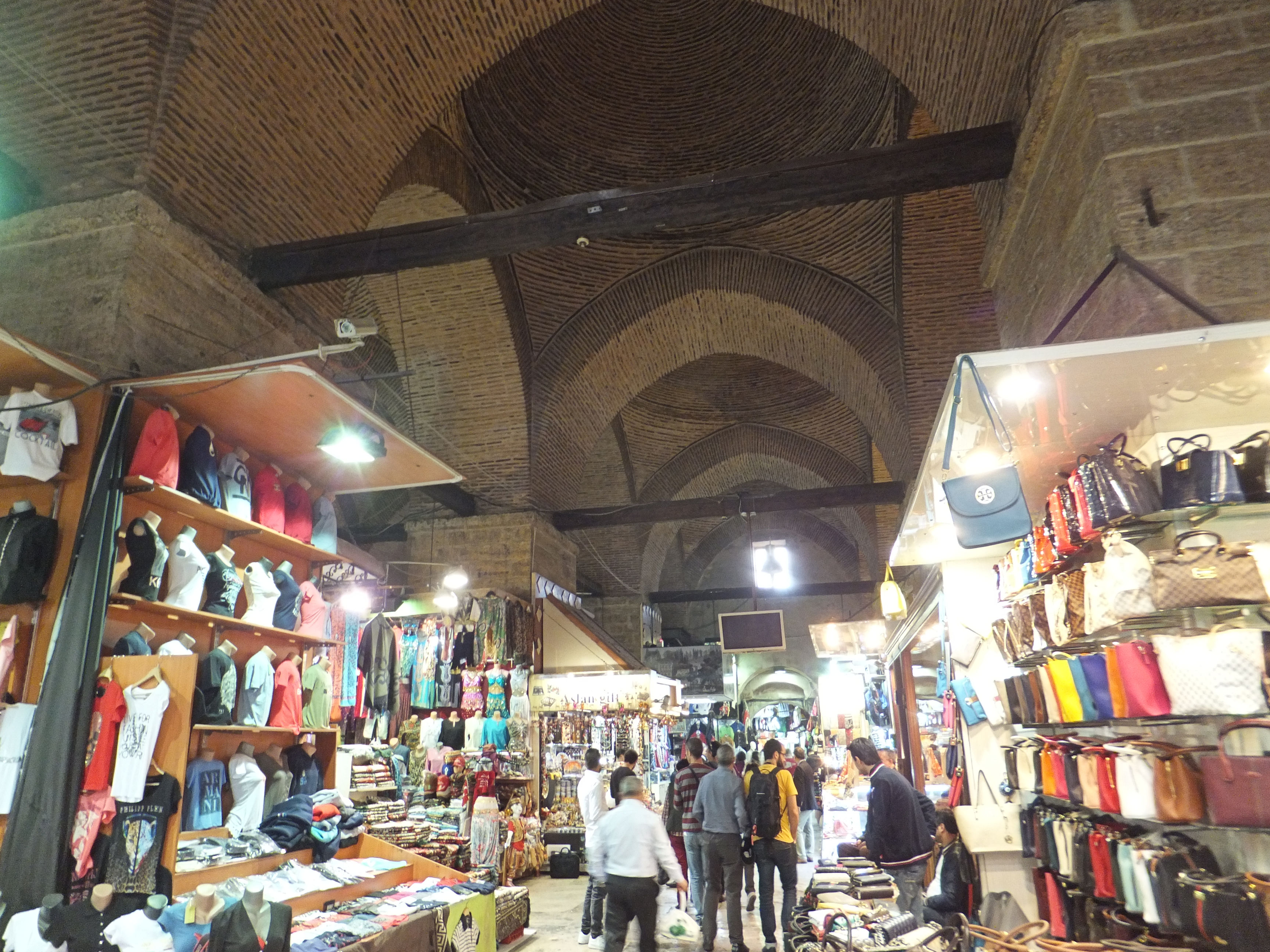
Interior of the Sandal Bedesten in the Grand Bazaar of Istanbul; attributed to the reign of Sultan Mehmed II (late 15th century)

The bedesten is a type of building that developed in the early Ottoman architecture of the 15th century. Bedestens originally began as a place to house fabric and textile sellers but eventually more precious goods were stored here. As this type of building was more secure and could be locked at night, it became the place where the most important goods (e.g. gold and jewellery) were stored, protected, regulated, and sold. Besides the trading of jewellery and textiles, slaves were also sold in bedestens.

Expert merchants in bedestans also assisted in commercial disputes, and in some cases officials were employed here to carry out similar regulatory duties. Waqf agreements (inalienable trusts in Islamic law) governed the function and upkeep of the bedesten and could provide salaries for these employees. Tenants could even rent booths in the bedesten from these waqfs. The bedesten was such an important building that during Ottoman times cities were often classified under two categories: cities with a bedesten and cities without a bedesten.

The first major bedestens were constructed in the capitals of the Ottoman Empire which served as economic hubs of the empire. The bedesten of Bursa was built in the late 14th century by Sultan Yildirim Bayezid I during his reign between 1389 and 1402. The bedesten of Edirne was built by Sultan Mehmed I between 1413 and 1421. The first Bedesten in Istanbul, variously known as the Inner Bedesten (Iç Bedesten), Old Bedesten (Eski Bedesten or Bedesten-i Atik), or the Jewellers' Bedesten (Cevahir Bedesteni), was built on the orders of Sultan Mehmed II Fatih between 1456 and 1461, soon after his conquest of the city. A second bedesten, the Sandal Bedesten, also known as the Small Bedesten (Küçük Bedesten) or New Bedesten (Bedesten-i Cedid), was built by Mehmed II about a dozen years later. These two bedestens formed the original core of Istanbul's Grand Bazaar, which grew around them over the following generations. Some Ottoman bedestens, including the ones in Bursa, Edirne, and Istanbul, are still operating as commercial centers today.

== Architecture ==
Bedestens normally have a rectangular floor plan, with a main chamber inside covered by domes and walled-off from the outside except for designated doorways. Their design was derived in part from the design of Ottoman mosques. Often there were shops on the outside perimeter, but the interior chamber was where the most important goods were stored and sold.

== Examples of bedestens ==
Numerous bedestens were built during the Ottoman Empire, a number of which have survived today. Some of the most notable examples include the following:

- Iç Bedesten in the Grand Bazaar of Istanbul (built between 1456 and 1461)
- Sandal Bedesten in the Grand Bazaar of Istanbul (built shortly after the Iç Bedesten)
- Bedesten of Bursa, Turkey (built between 1389 and 1402)
- Bedesten of Edirne, Turkey (built between 1413 and 1421)
- Mahmut Paşa Bedesten in Ankara, Turkey (built in late 15th century; today it houses part of the Museum of Anatolian Civilizations)
- Gazi-Husrev Beg's Bezistan in Baščaršija, Sarajevo, Bosnia and Herzegovina.
- Brusa Bezistan, also in Sarajevo
- Bezistan in Old Bazaar, Skopje, Macedonia
- Bezistan in Bitola, Macedonia
- Bedesten of Serres, Greece (today it houses the Archaeological Museum of Serres)
- Bedesten of Larissa, Greece
- Bedesten in Nicosia, Cyprus (originally a Greek Orthodox church from the 6th and 14th centuries, architecturally different from all other Ottoman bedestens)
- Bedesten of Thessaloniki, Greece

There are also reproductions after the Ottoman era, such as Bezistan, Belgrade.

Examples of Bedestens in Turkey
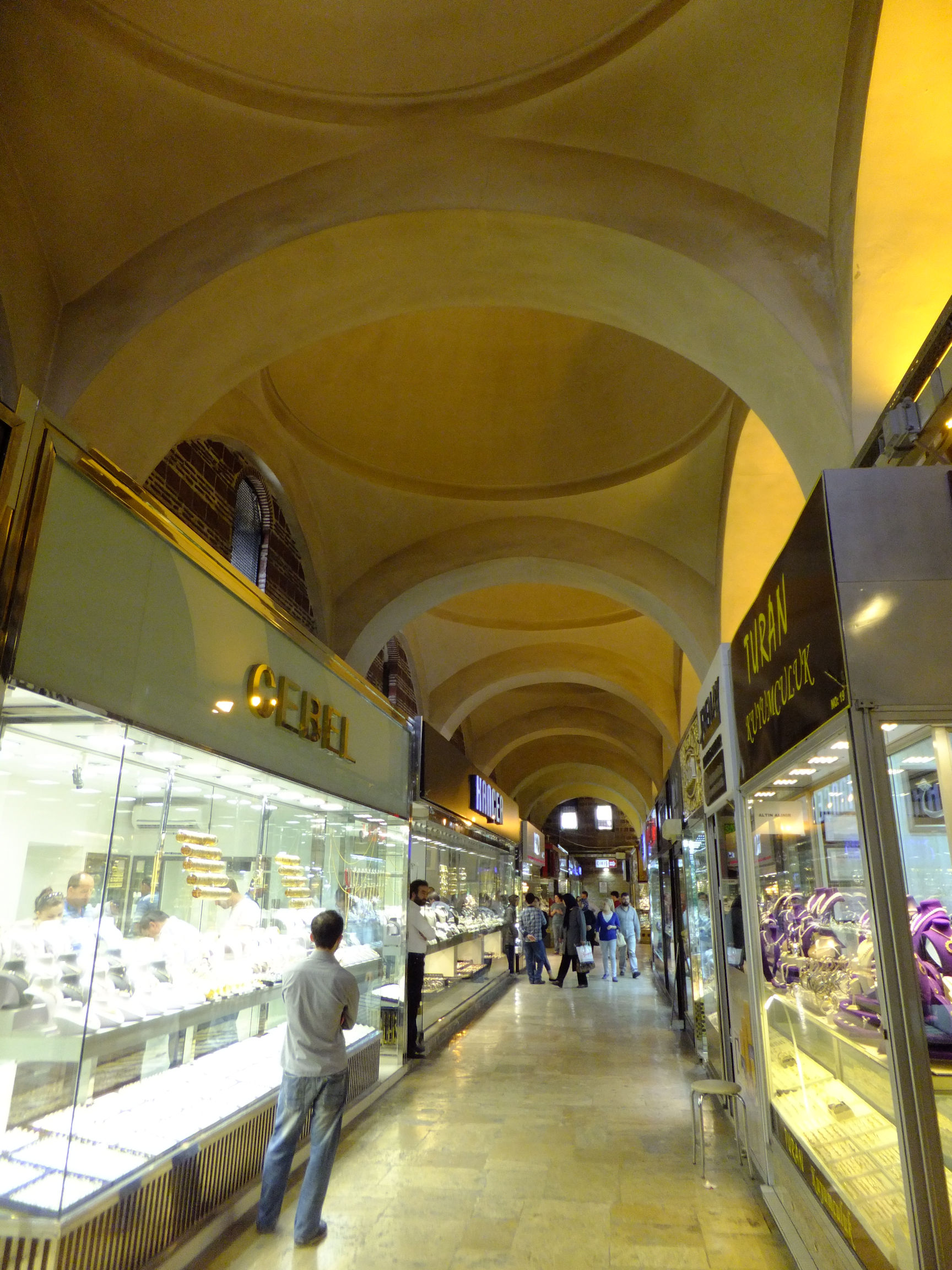
Interior of the Bedesten of Bursa (late 14th century)

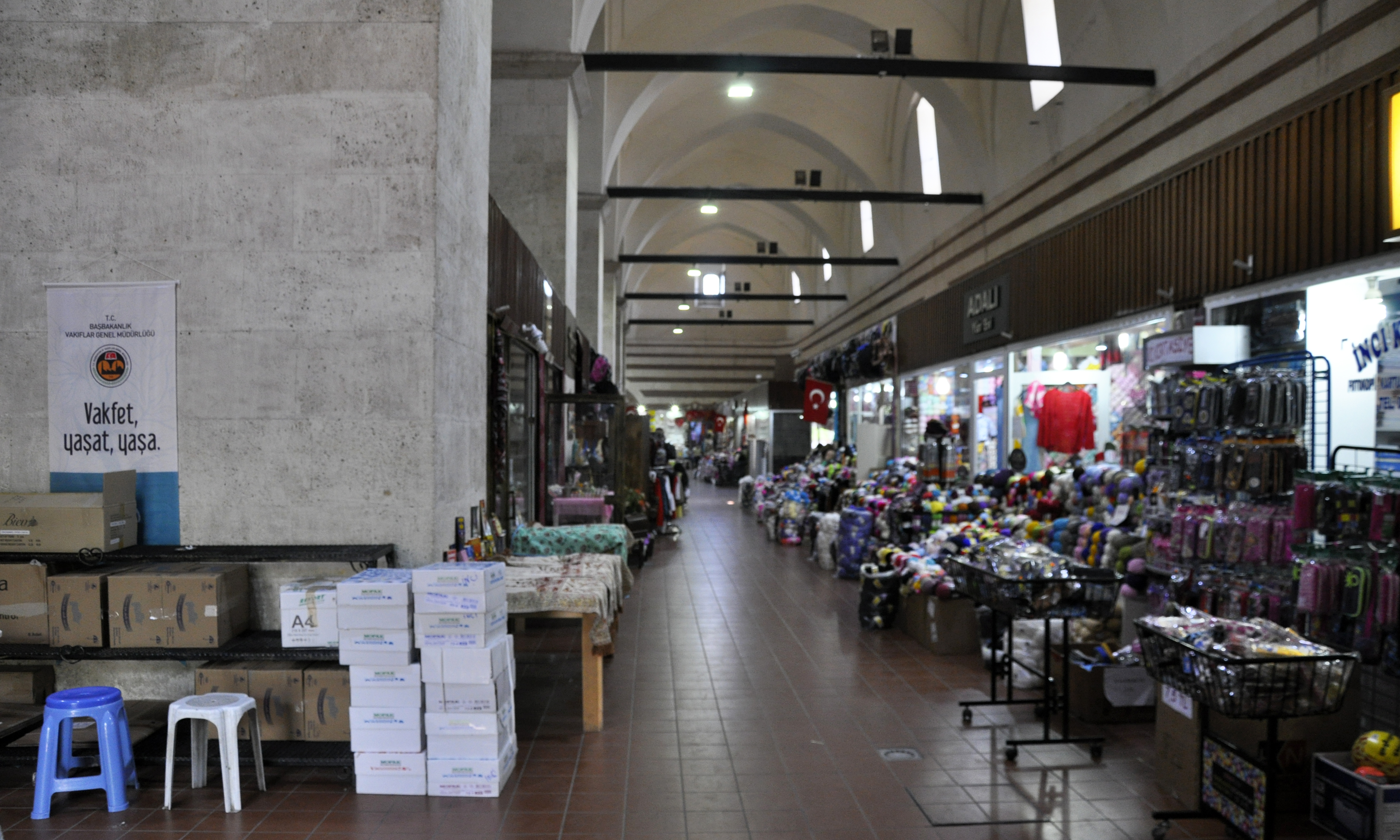
Interior of the Bedesten of Edirne (early 15th century)

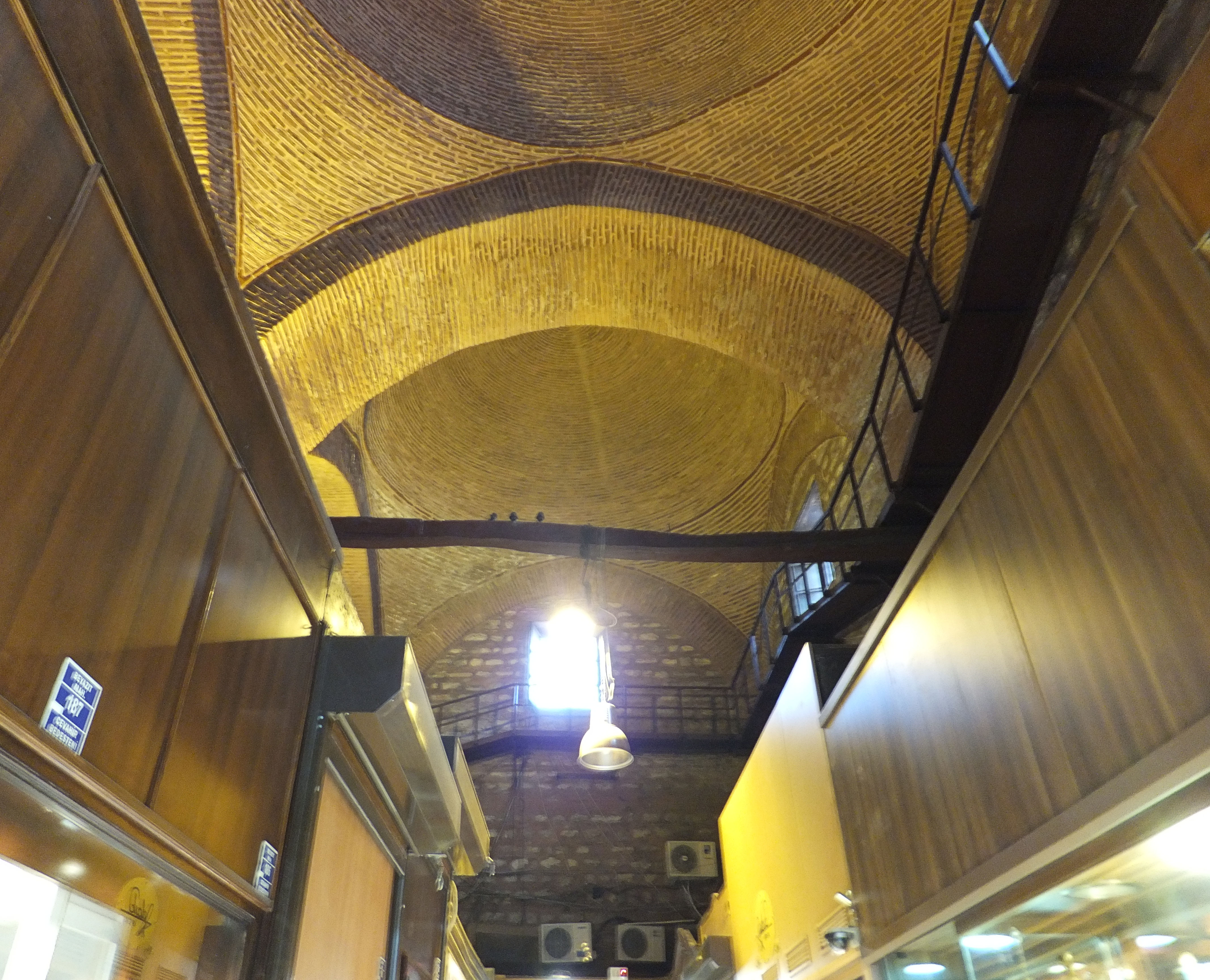
Interior of the Old Bedesten of the Grand Bazaar of Istanbul, built by Sultan Mehmed II between 1456 and 1461

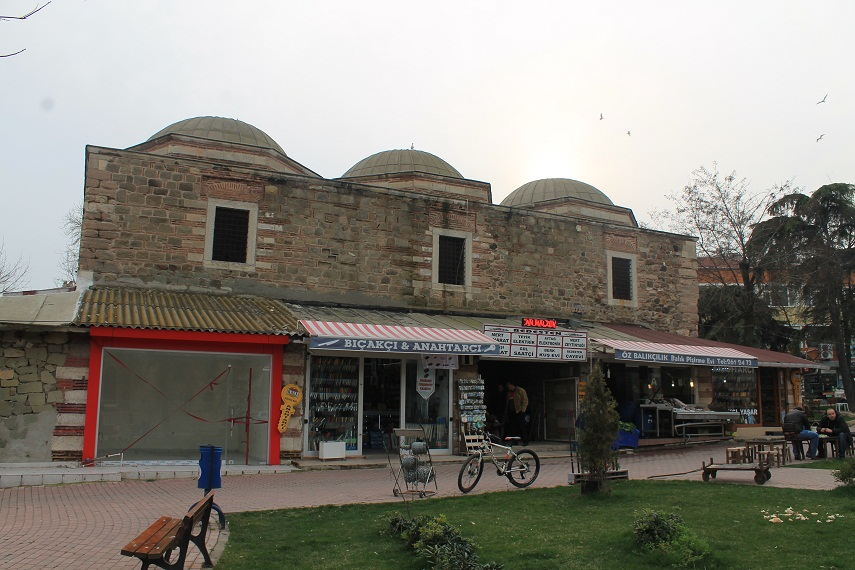
Bedesten in Tekirdağ, Turkey

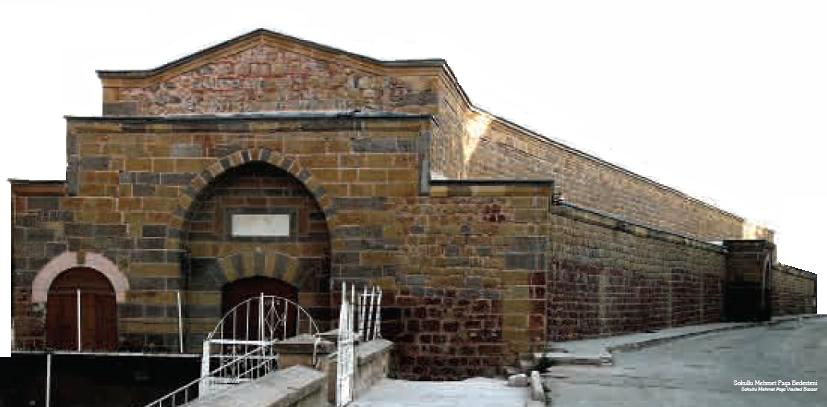
Bedesten in Nigde, Turkey

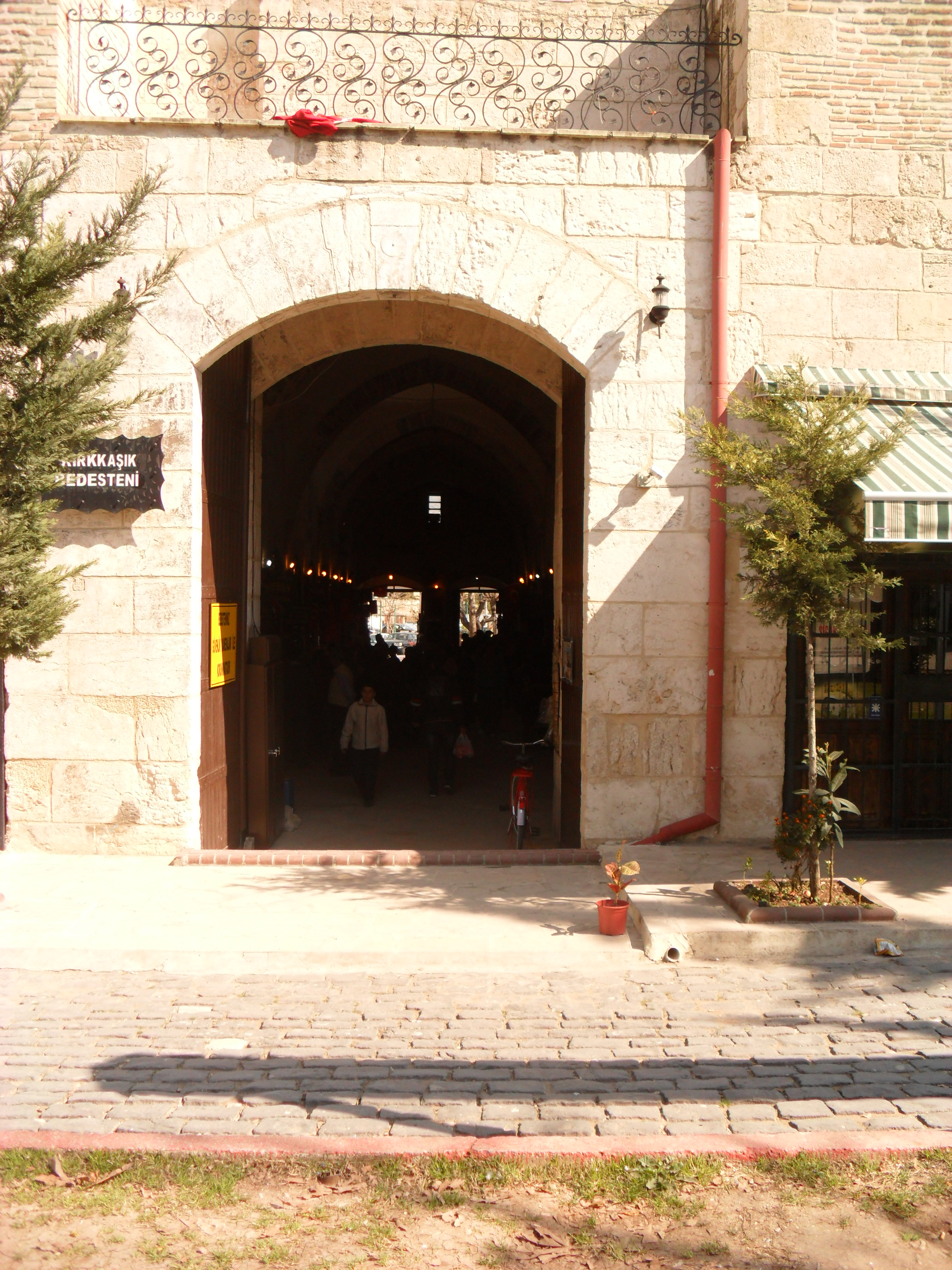
Kırkkaşık Bedesten, Tarsus, Mersin, Turkey

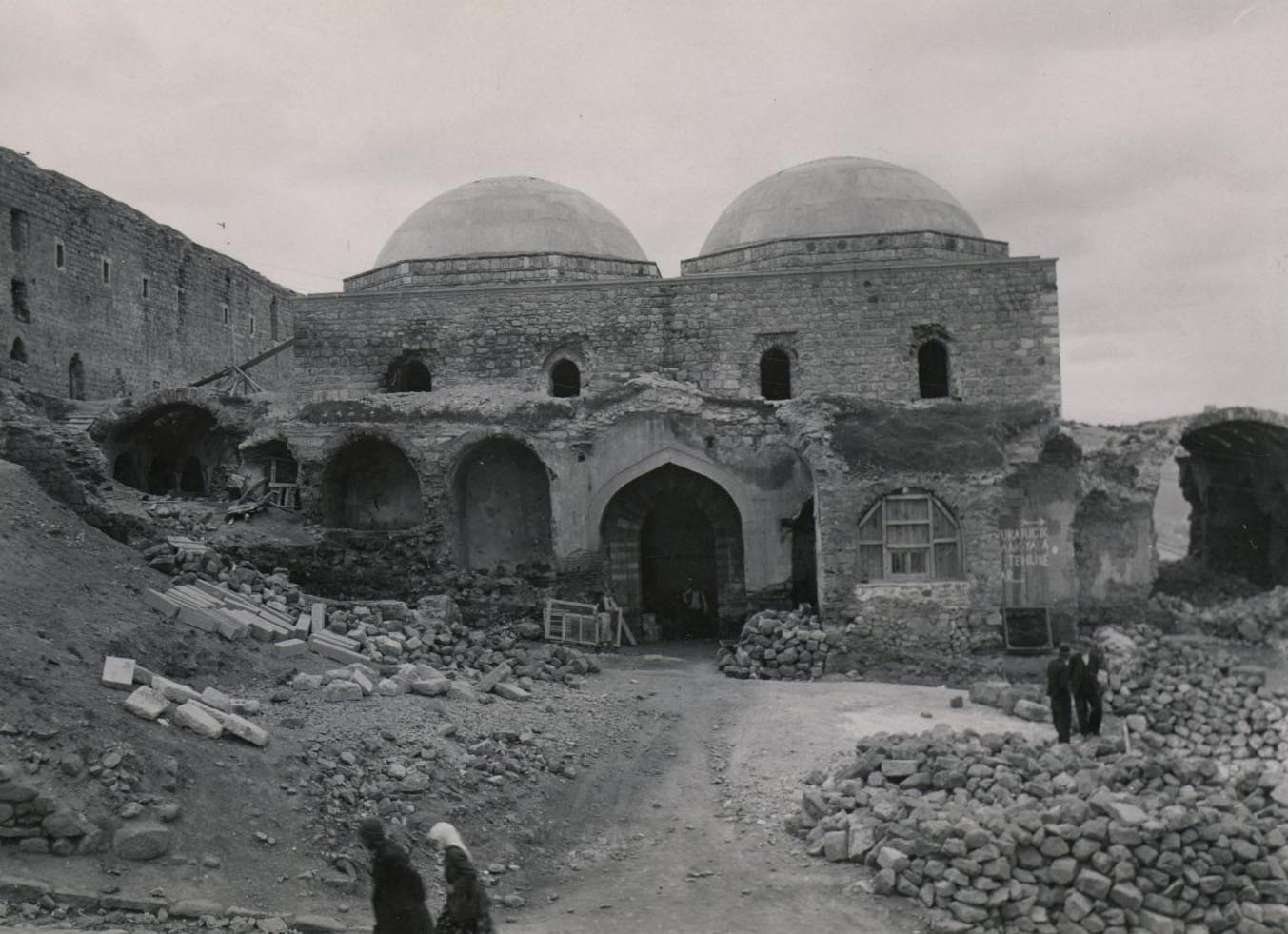
Old photograph of the Mahmut Paşa Bedesten in Ankara, before restoration

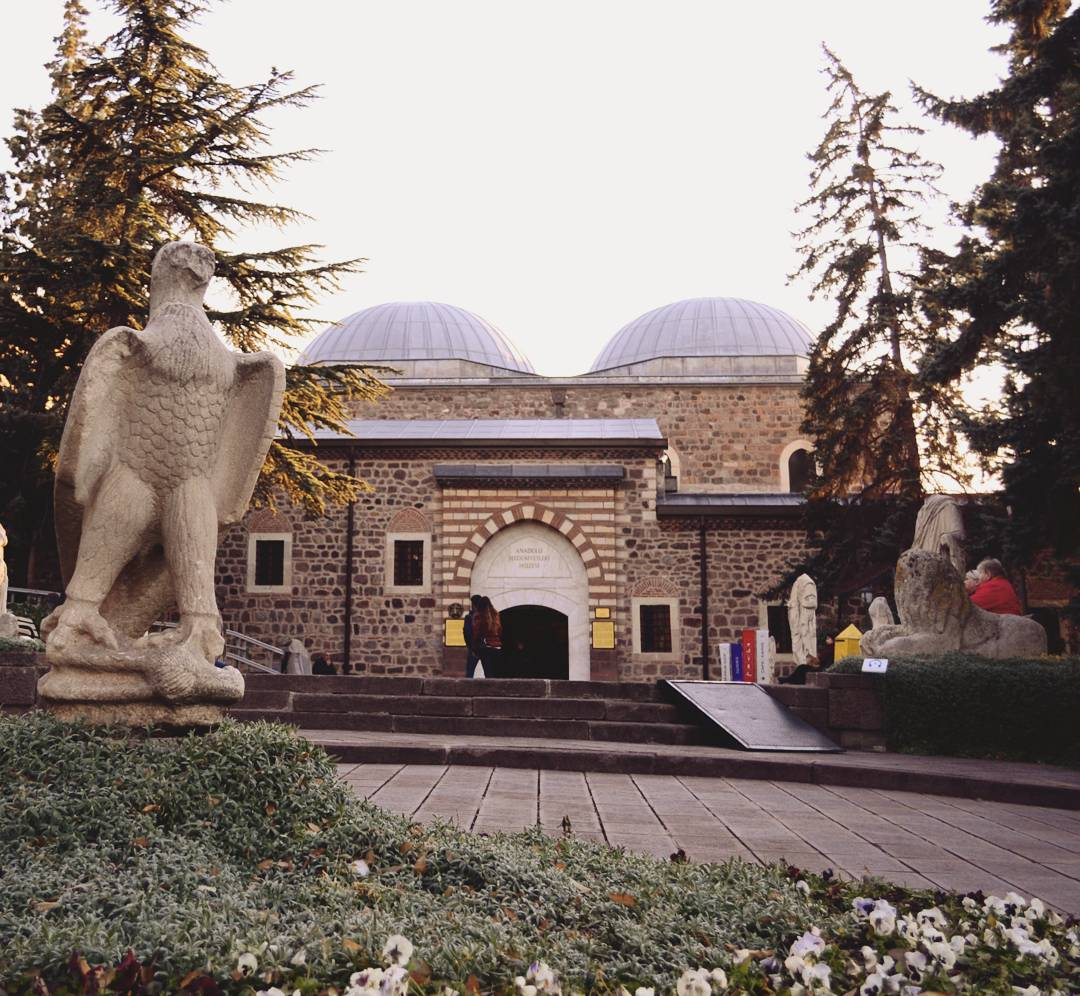
The Mahmut Paşa Bedesten in Ankara today, housing the Museum of Anatolian Civilizations

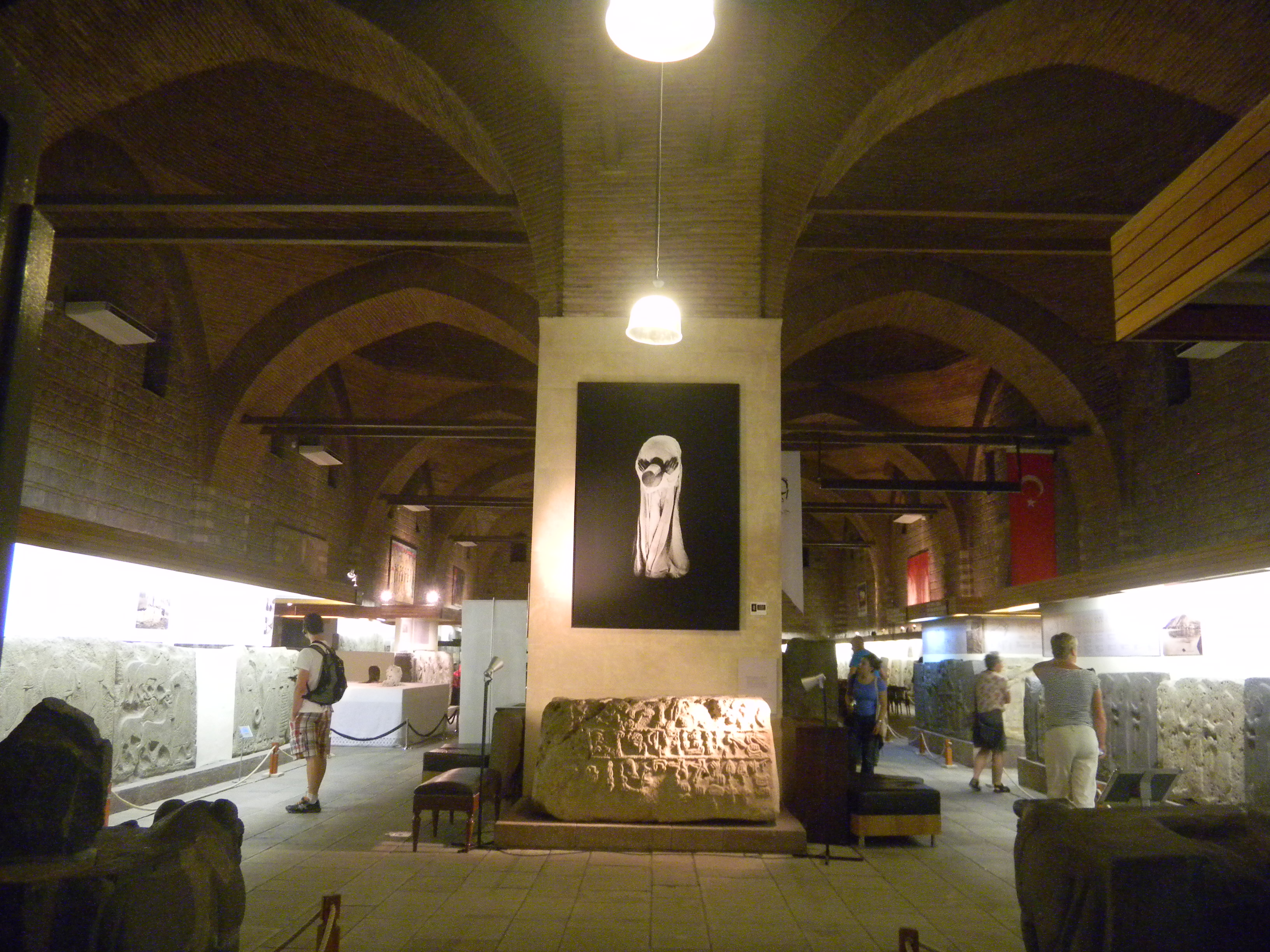
Interior of the Mahmut Paşa Bedesten today, part of the Museum of Anatolian Civilizations
Examples of Bedestens in the Balkans
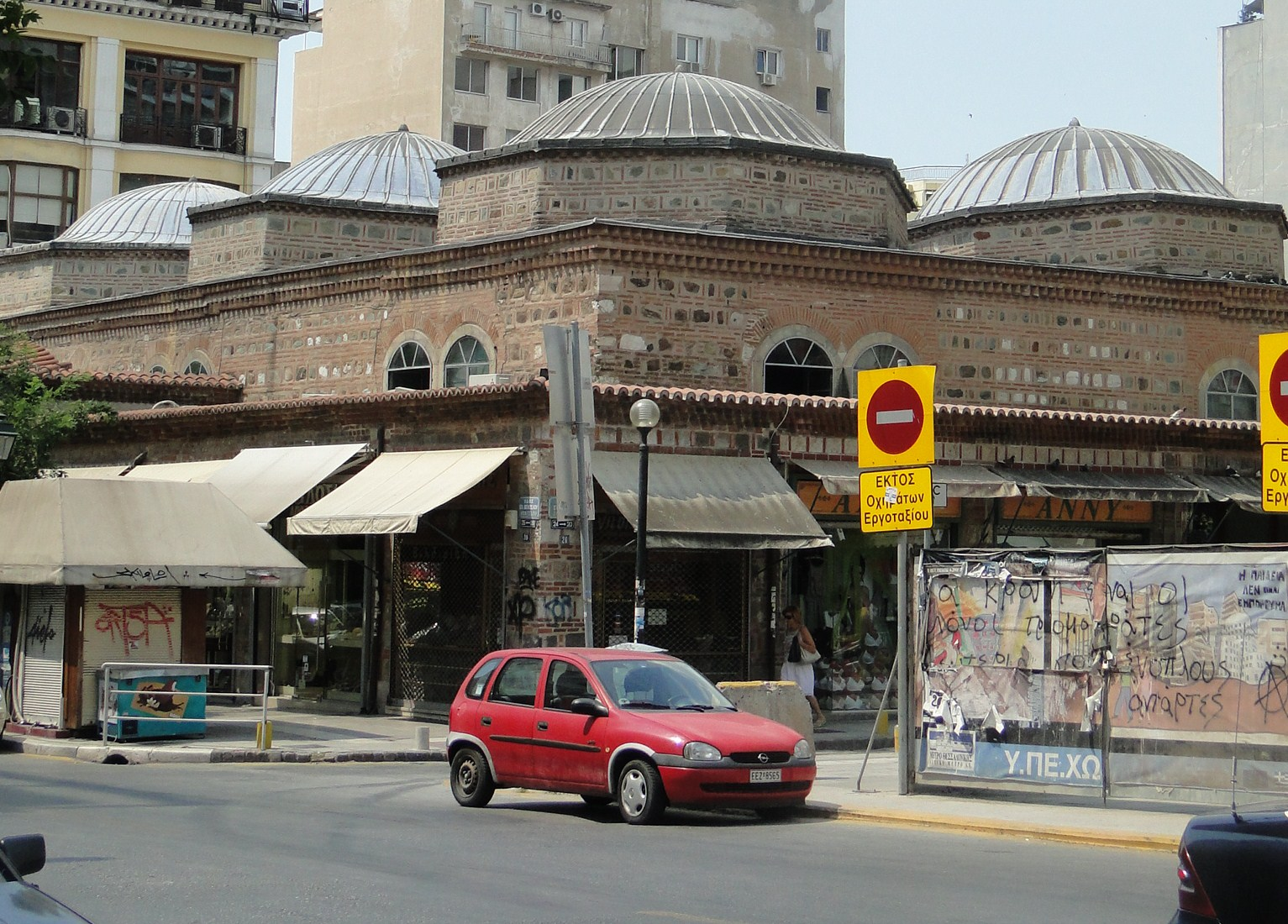
Bedesten in Thessaloniki, Greece

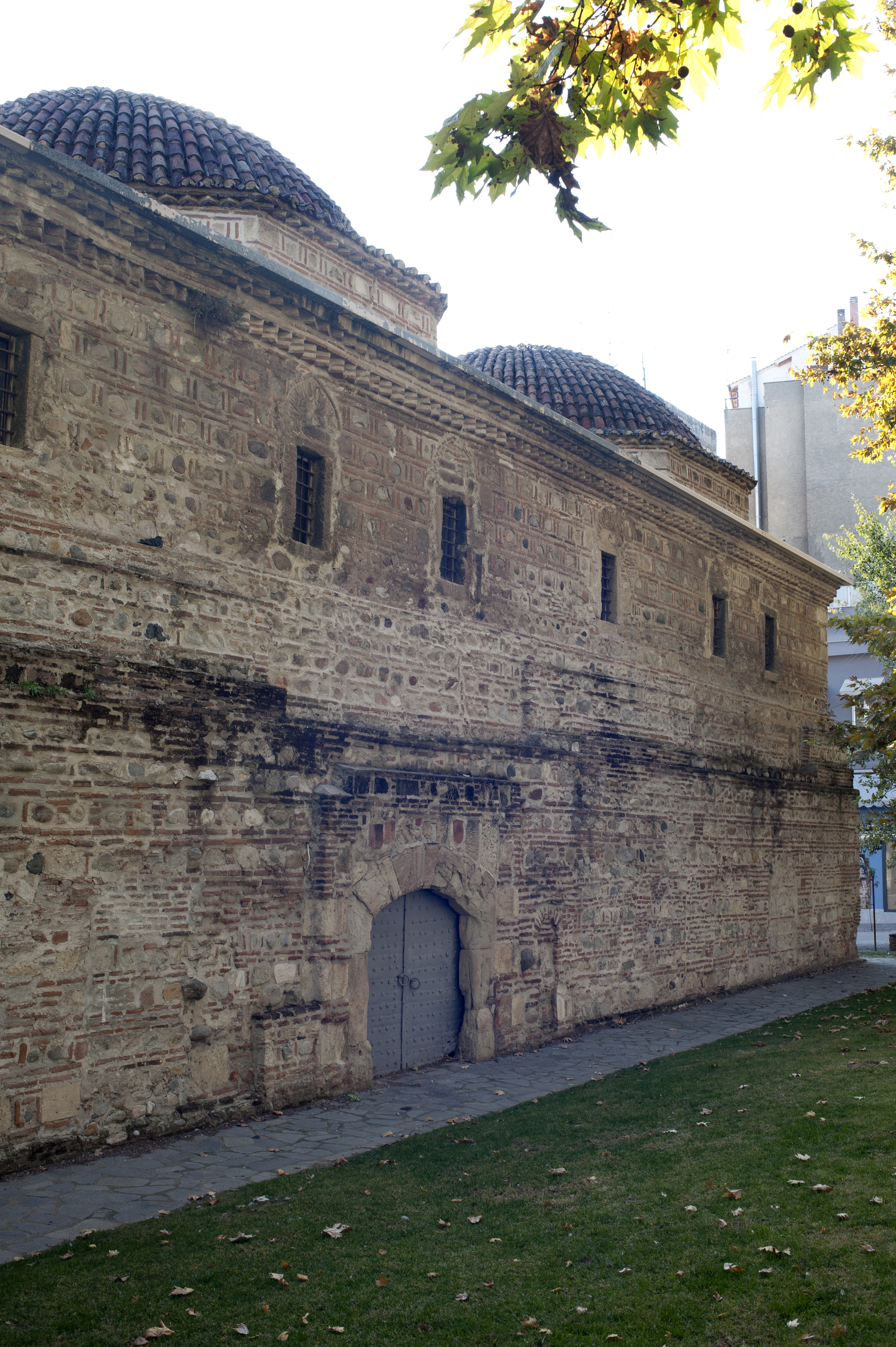
Bedesten of Serres, Greece

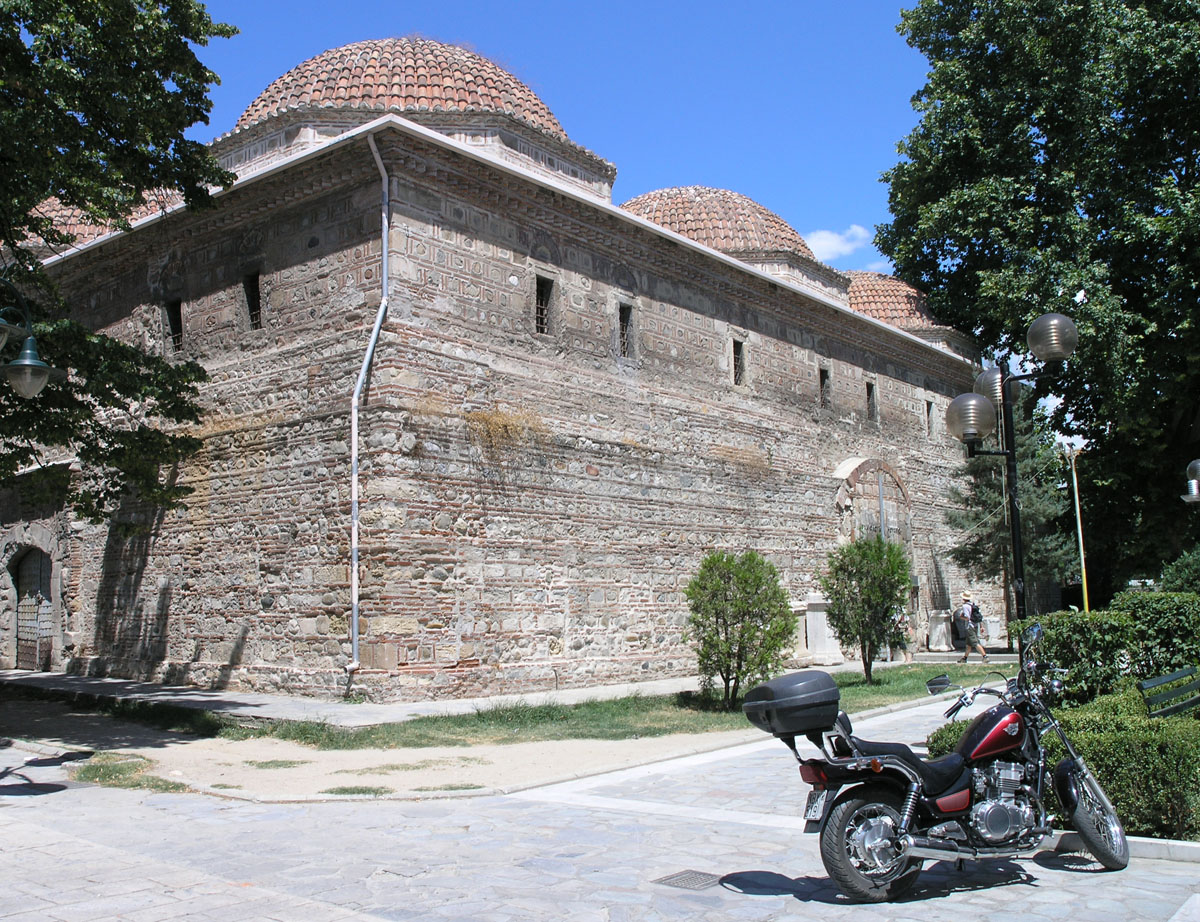
Bedesten of Serres, Greece

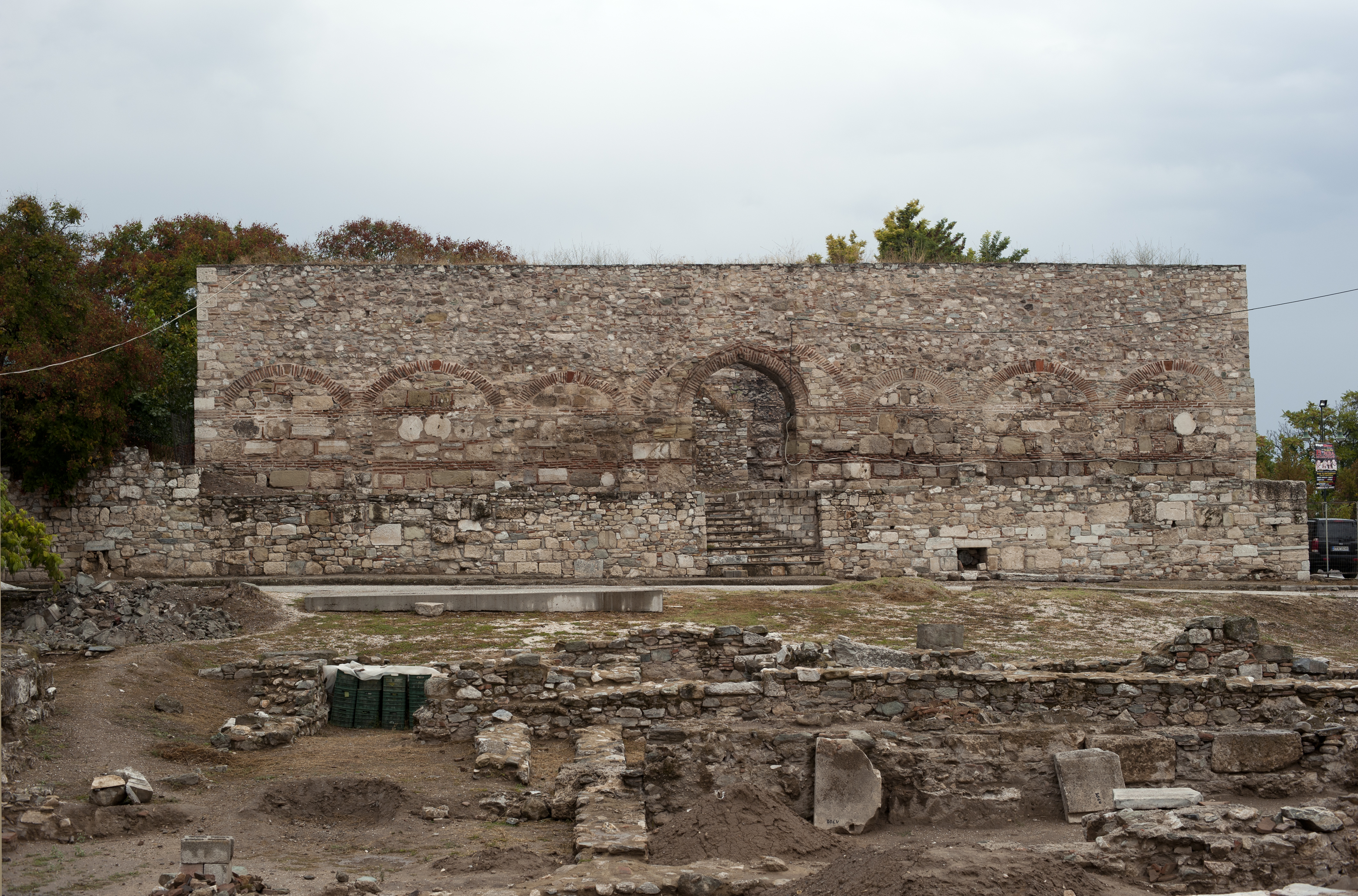
Bedesten of Larissa, Greece

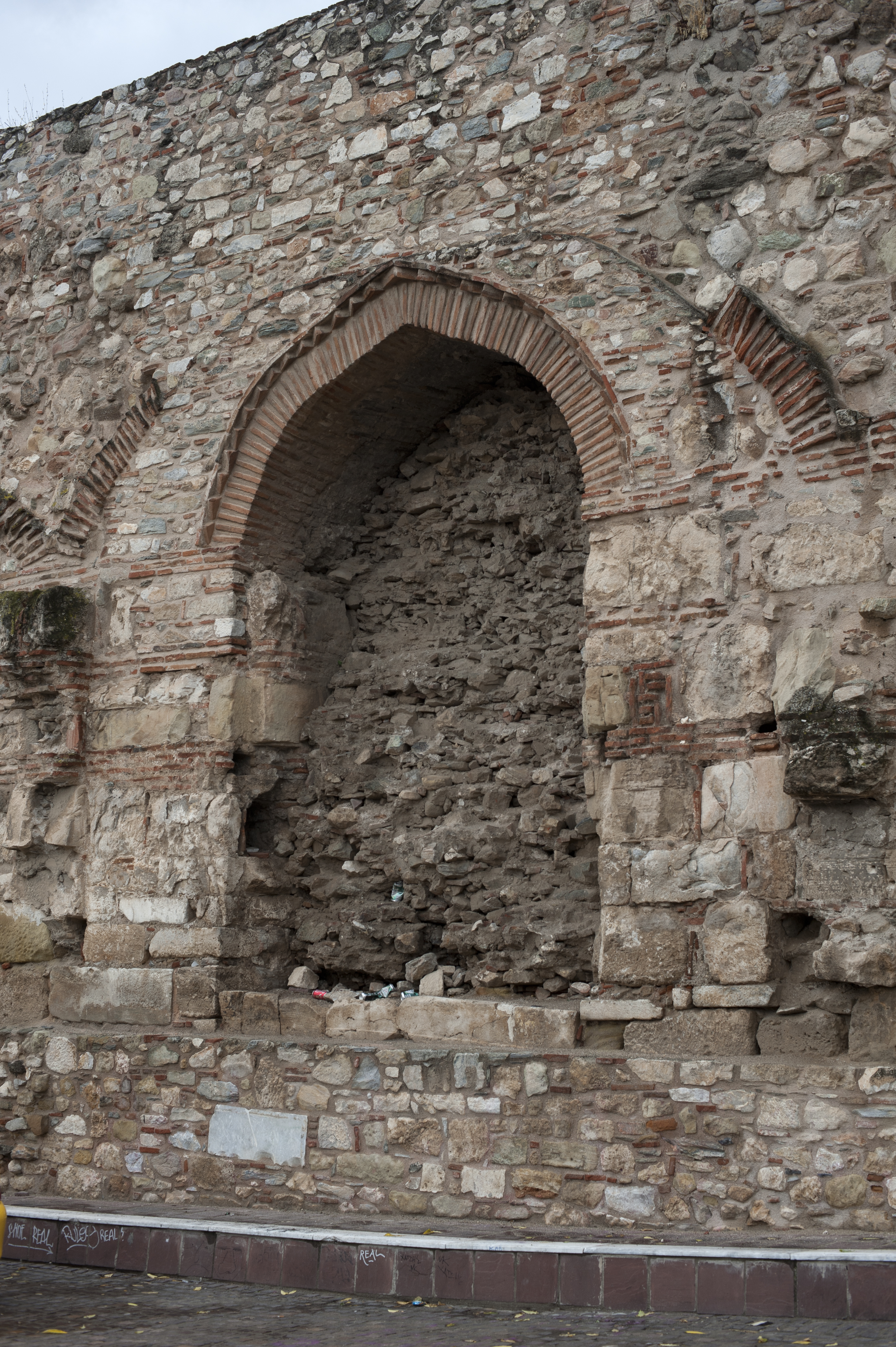
Detail of the Bedesten of Larissa, Greece

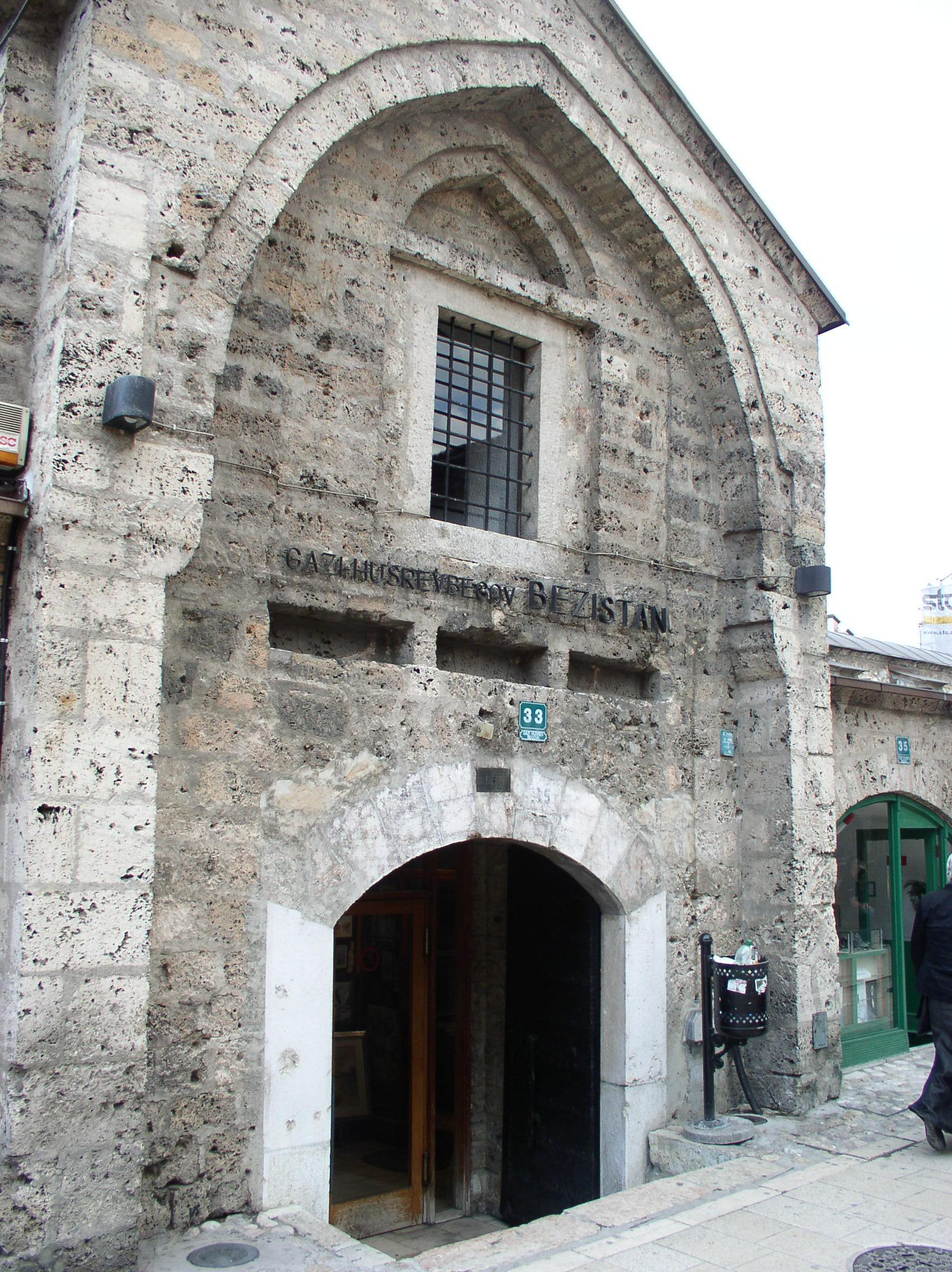
Entrance of Gazi-Husrev Beg's Bezistan of Sarajevo, Bosnia and Herzegovina

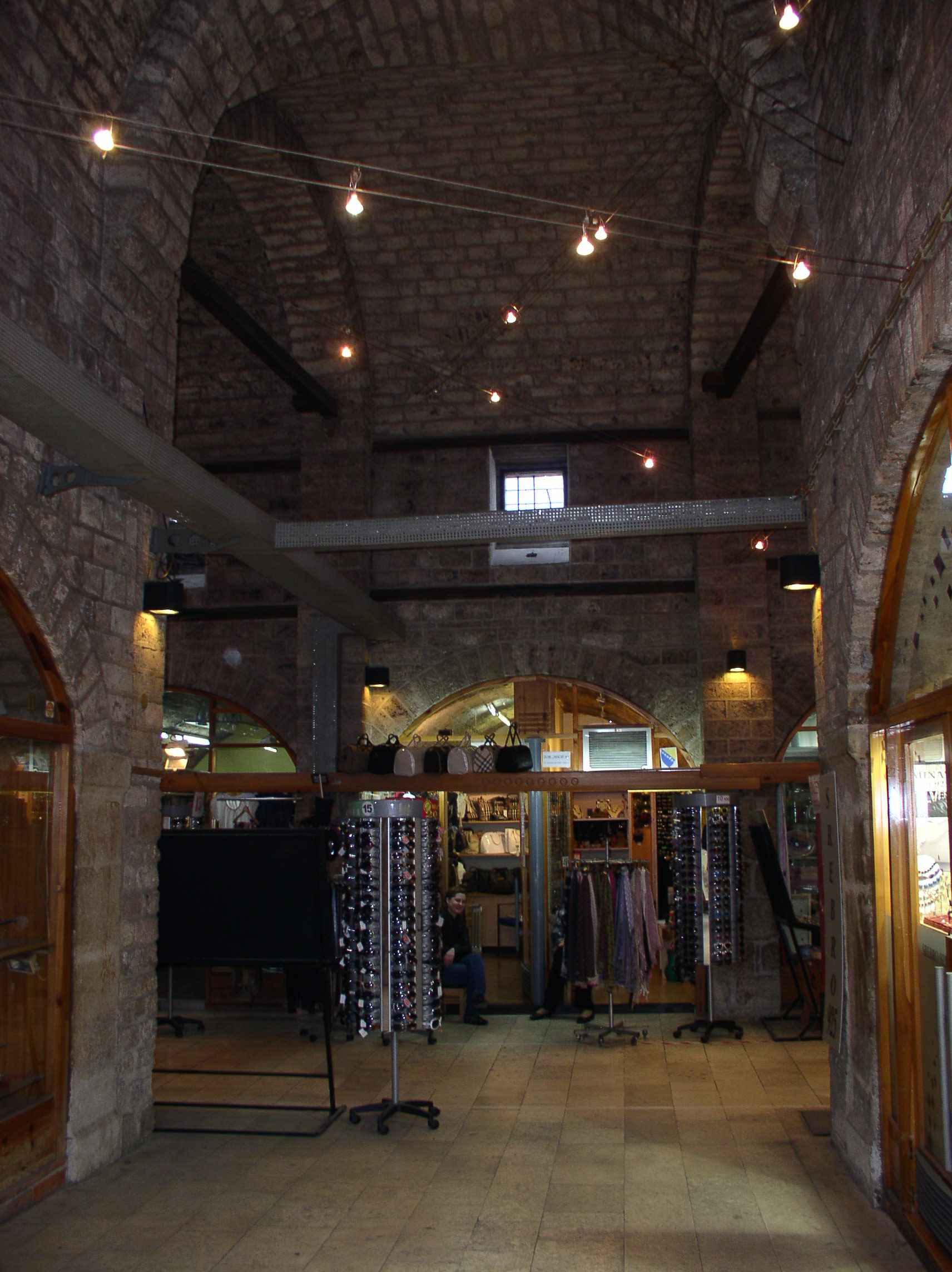
Interior of the Gazi-Husrev Beg's Bezistan in Sarajevo, Bosnia and Herzegovina

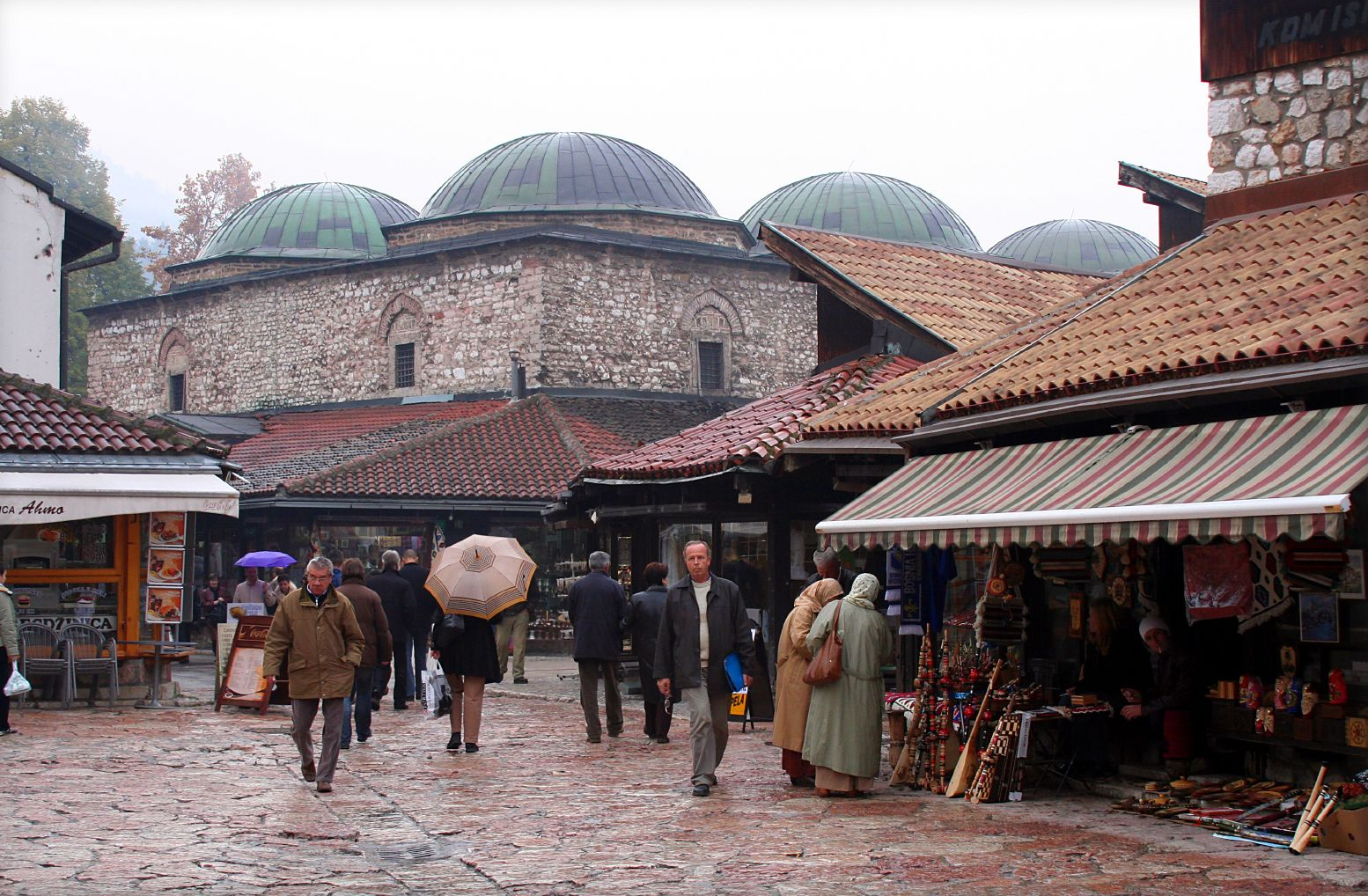
Brusa Bezistan of Sarajevo, Bosnia and Herzegovina

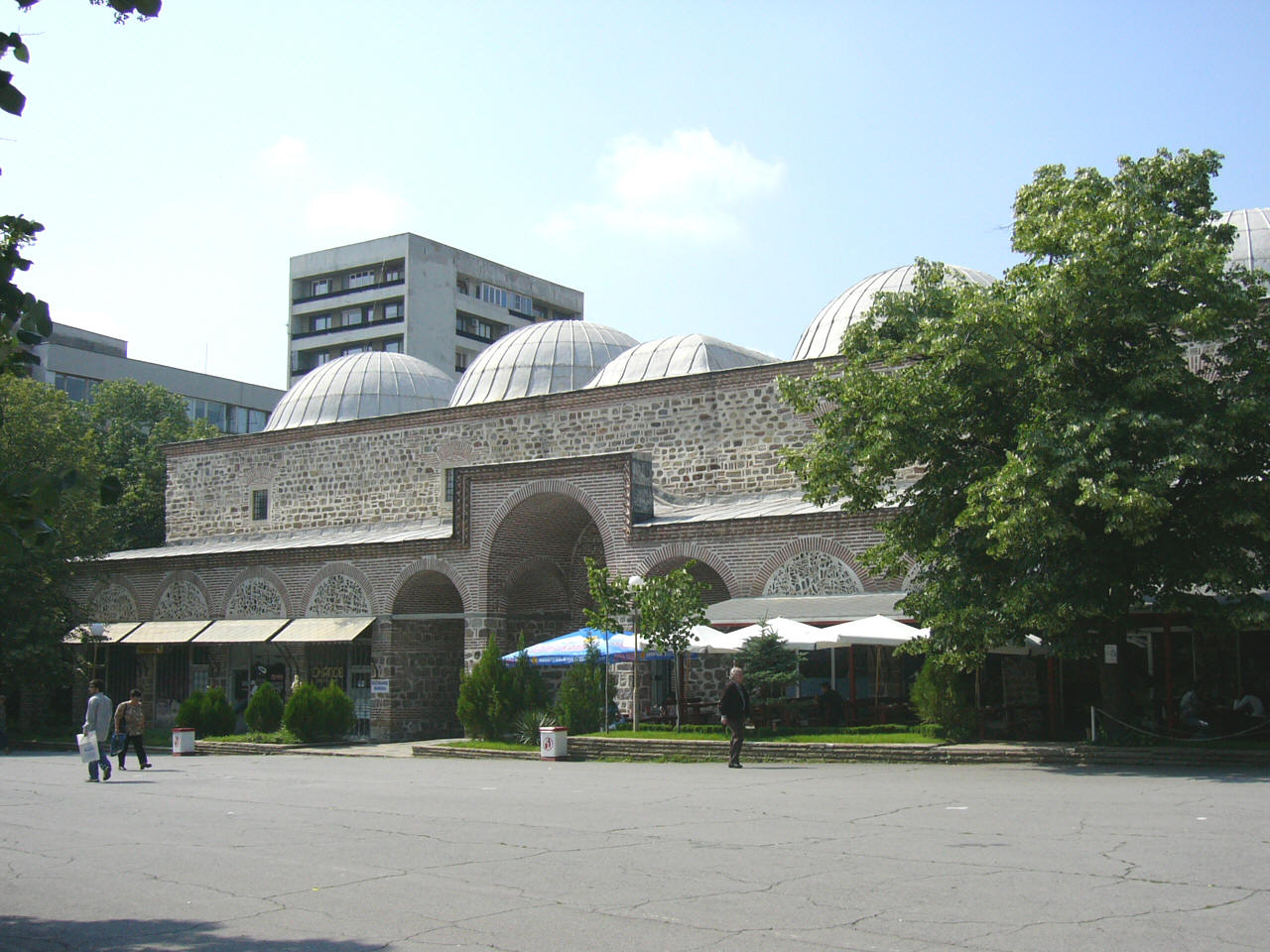
Bedesten in Yambol, Bulgaria.

== Sources ==
- Eyice, Semavi (1992). "Bedesten" (PDF). İslâm Ansiklopedisi, Vol. 5 (Balaban - Beşir Ağa) (in Turkish). Istanbul: Turkiye Diyanet Vakfi. pp. 302–311.
