= List of settlements in the Kastoria regional unit =

Regional settlements

This is a list of settlements in the Kastoria regional unit, Macedonia, Greece.

- Agia Kyriaki
- Agios Antonios
- Agios Ilias
- Ammoudara
- Ampelokipoi
- Argos Orestiko
- Asprokklisia
- Avgi
- Chalara
- Chiliodendro
- Chionato
- Chrysi
- Dendrochori
- Dialekto
- Dipotamia
- Dispilio
- Eptachori
- Gavros
- Germas
- Gramos
- Ieropigi
- Kalochori
- Kastanofyto
- Kastoria
- Kleisoura
- Komninades
- Korisos
- Koromilia
- Kostarazi
- Kotyli
- Kranionas
- Kypseli
- Lagka
- Lakkomata
- Lefki
- Lithia
- Makrochori
- Maniakoi
- Mavrochori
- Mavrokampos
- Melanthio
- Melas
- Melissotopos
- Mesopotamia
- Metamorfosi
- Militsa
- Nestorio
- Nostimo
- Oinoi
- Omorfokklisia
- Oxya
- Pentavryso
- Polyanemo
- Polykarpi
- Polykeraso
- Ptelea
- Pteria
- Sidirochori
- Spilaia
- Spilios
- Toichio
- Tsakoni
- Vasileiada
- Vogatsiko
- Vrachos
- Vyssinia
- Zouzouli

== See also ==
- List of towns and villages in Greece
