= Lefki, Kastoria =

Greek village

Lefki
- Community
- Location within Greece
- Coordinates: 40°32′8″N 21°10′56″E
- Country: Greece
- Geographic region: Macedonia
- Administrative region: Western Macedonia
- Regional unit: Kastoria
- Municipality: Kastoria
- Municipal unit: Agia Triada

Population (2021)
  - Community: 820
- Time zone: UTC+2 (EET)
  - Summer (DST): UTC+3 (EEST)

Lefki (Greek: Λευκη, before 1927: Ζουπάνιτσα – Zoupanitsa; Macedonian: Жупаништа Županišta; Bulgarian: Жупанища Zhupanishta, Жупанишча Zhupanishcha in the Kostur dialect) is a village in Kastoria Regional Unit, Macedonia, Greece.

== Geography ==
The village is located 5 kilometers away from the city of Kastoria. North of it, lies the mountain "Agia Triada" or "Holy Trinity". South of it, lies the river "Ladopotamos". In between the river of Ladopotamos and Zupanista, lies the village of "Orman" or "Kato Lefki" also known as "Lower Lefki". West of it lies the village of Koromilia or "Sliveni" and from the east lies the village of Maniakoi or "Maniak". The village has an elevation of 795 meters above sea level.

== History ==
According to linguist Ivan Duridanov, the village's original Slavic name is said to have derived from the word "Župan" which was a title given to Slavic leaders of the Middle Ages. and the word "ishchi", a patronymic name. The Bulgarian Etymological Dictionary, also states that the name comes from the Slavic title of "Župan".

The first mentions of the village originate from Ottoman tax records where Ottoman authorities mention a village with the name "Zhupanishte". Alexander Sinve, in his book Les Grecs de l'Empire Ottoman. Etude Statistique et Ethnographique, wrote that in the year 1878, 600 people lived in the "Zoumbanista". In the Ethnography of the Provinces of Adrianople, Monastir and Thessaloniki, published in the year 1878, in the city of Constantinople which reflected the statistics of the male population from 1873, "Zhupanitsa" is listed as a village with 95 households and 307 inhabitants.

In 1945, Greek Foreign Minister Ioannis Politis ordered the compilation of demographic data regarding the Prefecture of Kastoria. The village Lefki had a total of 732 inhabitants, populated by 700 Slavophones with a Bulgarian national consciousness. The inhabitants speak the Dolna Koreshcha variant of the Kostur dialect.
