= Omorfokklisia, Kastoria =

Omorfokklisia
- Community
- Location within Greece
- Coordinates: 40°25′47″N 21°7′12″E
- Country: Greece
- Geographic region: Macedonia
- Administrative region: Western Macedonia
- Regional unit: Kastoria
- Municipality: Kastoria
- Municipal unit: Agia Triada

Population (2021)
  - Community: 19
- Time zone: UTC+2 (EET)
  - Summer (DST): UTC+3 (EEST)

Omorfokklisia (Greek: Ομορφοκκλησιά, before 1926: Γκάλιστα – Gkalista) is a village in Kastoria Regional Unit, Macedonia, Greece.

The 1920 Greek census recorded 596 people in the village, and 400 inhabitants (40 families) were Muslim in 1923. Following the Greek–Turkish population exchange, Greek refugee families in Gkalista were from Pontus (45) in 1926. The 1928 Greek census recorded 406 village inhabitants. In 1928, the refugee families numbered 32 (118 people) . After the population exchange, the village mosque and the water fountain next to it were destroyed.

In 1945, Greek Foreign Minister Ioannis Politis ordered the compilation of demographic data regarding the Prefecture of Kastoria. The village Omorfokklisia had a total of 569 inhabitants, and was populated by 280 Slavophones without a Bulgarian national consciousness.
