= Poreia =

- Community
- Location within Greece
- Coordinates: 40°29′19.07″N 21°12′46.54″E
- Country: Greece
- Geographic region: Macedonia
- Administrative region: Western Macedonia
- Regional unit: Kastoria
- Municipality: Kastoria
- Municipal unit: Agia Triada

Population (2021)
  - Community: 409
- Time zone: UTC+2 (EET)
  - Summer (DST): UTC+3 (EEST)

Poreia (Greek: Πορειά, before 1926: Ίζγλιμπι – Izglimpi) is a village and a community in Kastoria Regional Unit, Macedonia, Greece.

In 1945, Greek Foreign Minister Ioannis Politis ordered the compilation of demographic data regarding the Prefecture of Kastoria. The village Poreia had a total of 238 inhabitants, and was populated by 218 Slavophones with a Bulgarian national consciousness.
