= Tsakoni, Kastoria =

Village in Macedonia, Greece

Tsakoni
- Community
- Location within Greece
- Coordinates: 40°28′40″N 21°9′37″E
- Country: Greece
- Geographic region: Macedonia
- Administrative region: Western Macedonia
- Regional unit: Kastoria
- Municipality: Kastoria
- Municipal unit: Agia Triada

Population (2021)
  - Community: 246
- Time zone: UTC+2 (EET)
  - Summer (DST): UTC+3 (EEST)

Tsakoni (Greek: Τσάκονη) is a village in Kastoria Regional Unit, Macedonia, Greece.

The 1920 Greek census recorded 354 people in the village, and 200 inhabitants (40 families) were Muslim in 1923. Following the Greek–Turkish population exchange, Greek refugee families in Tsakoni were from Asia Minor (10) and Pontus (18) in 1926. The 1928 Greek census recorded 341 village inhabitants. In 1928, the refugee families numbered 26 (106 people).

In 1945, Greek Foreign Minister Ioannis Politis ordered the compilation of demographic data regarding the Prefecture of Kastoria. The village Tsakoni had a total of 466 inhabitants, and was populated by 50 Slavophones without a Bulgarian national consciousness.
