= Paskal Mitrevski =

Slavic Macedonian communist

Paskal Mitrevski (Macedonian: Паскал Митревски; 1912 – February 11, 1978), also known as Paskal Mitrovski or Paschalis Mitropoulos, was a Macedonian communist partisan and a president of the Macedonian National Liberation Front, founded in Greece by the Slavic Macedonian minority after the Second World War.

== Life ==
=== Early life and participation in anti-Axis resistance ===
Mitrevski was born in 1912 in the Kastorian village of Čuka (Chuka), then in the Ottoman Empire, today Archangelos, Greece. He completed his primary education in Rupishta and went to high school in Kostur (Kastoria). Mitrevski graduated from the Faculty of Law in the University of Thessaloniki. He became a communist while he was a law student, but was expelled from the local communist youth organisation for allegedly mismanaging party funds and having secret contacts with the authorities. Mitrevski was not allowed to be in the local Communist Party of Greece (KKE) organisation until March 1943, when he and other male inhabitants of Argos Orestiko left to join the resistance against the Axis occupation, inspired by KKE members active there. Shortly after, a Bulgarophile associate in nearby Maniakoi mediated for his safe return to Argos Orestiko. He stayed in the town until July 1943, when the local KKE organisation invited him to join the Greek resistance movement - ELAS. In that period, Mitrevski was reputed as a rich landowner's son inclined to pursuing women and wasting his family's wealth for pleasure, but his influence with the Slavic Macedonians of the town and the neighbouring villages made him useful to KKE's leadership, who wished to use him to attract Slavic Macedonians away from the opponents. He was instrumental in the creation of the Slavomacedonian National Liberation Front (SNOF). In the same year, he became the secretary of SNOF's District Committee in Kostur.

In a January 1944 conference of SNOF representatives at the village Mavrokampos to discuss the future of Macedonia and "the establishment of a federal state in Greece, of which Greek Macedonia would be a regular member", Mitrevski supported the idea of a federal Greece, but Stavros Kotsopoulos and Kyriakos Pylais opined that Greece was not a multi-ethnic state, and that the Slavic Macedonians were an insignificant minority in the country. His gradual shift away from ELAS and towards the Yugoslav Partisans was tolerated in the hope of attracting and keeping the opponents away from the occupying forces. Along with other former SNOF leaders, he created the "Provisional Revolutionary Committee of Greek-occupied Macedonia", which invited Slavic Macedonian ELAS fighters to go to Yugoslavia and continue the struggle of the "Slav Macedonians" for "self-determination". Mitrevski also served as the secretary of the Political Commission of Macedonians under Greece in 1944.

=== Involvement with the National Liberation Front ===
In a meeting of the Political Commission on April 23, 1945, the National Liberation Front (NOF) was established, as a single and united organisation of all Slavic Macedonians in Greece. A central leadership was elected, consisting of him as secretary. The first contacts between NOF and KKE happened in April 1946, with Mitrevski representing NOF in meetings. On November 21, 1946, the final unification agreement between the KKE and the NOF was reached. They both agreed that Slavic Macedonian party organisations in Greek Macedonia would be taken by the KKE, NOF (including the Antifascist Front of Women, AFŽ) would be under the control and leadership of KKE, while NOF would keep its central leadership (consisting of him and Mihajlo Keramitčiev) and answer to KKE's regional committee. Mitrevski also became part of its bureau as per the agreement.

A rift occurred between Mitrevski and Mihajlo Keramitčiev, and other leaders of NOF. This was in turn over the dismissal of NOF leaders such as Vangel Ajanovski-Oče and Lambro Colakov from the Executive Council by General Ioannidis and their replacement with KKE loyalists, with Mitrevski being the only NOF leader to support the changes. Other NOF leaders regarded Mitrevski as an able and clever person, as well as an arrogant, vain, opportunistic, and ambitious careerist. In turn, the matter was taken to the Politburo of the party on February 20–21, 1948, where Mitrevski and the leader of AFŽ, Vera Nikolova, publicly criticised each other. Nikolova accused Mitrevski of being selfish, ambitious, distrusting the other NOF leaders and monopolising the leadership. In response, Mitrevski accused Nikolova and his other opponents of holding anti-party views and creating an anti-party faction. In a meeting, to settle disputes, of the Executive Committee of the NOF, on March 27, 1948, Mitrevski proposed Kotsopoulos as the leader of the party's cell rather than Mihajlo Keramitčiev, who had the support of his opponents, but Kotsopoulos ended up becoming the secretary. In an appeal to the Communist Party of Yugoslavia in April 1948, other NOF leaders claimed that Mitrevski was "motivated solely by his own personal ambitions", "universally distrusted by NOF cadres", and they also called for his dismissal for being "harmful to the whole organization and a stumbling block to the improvement of relations between us and the Greeks." He attended the general meeting of the Politburo on July 10, which adopted a motion denouncing NOF and indirectly the Slavic Macedonian contribution to the war effort. The rifts which had occurred between him and Keramitčiev were seen as potentially fatal to the party and he was removed as leader of NOF on August 8, 1948. Stavros Kotsopoulos officially became president while Vangel Kojčev was made secretary. By December, however, it had been decided by Nikos Zachariadis that the membership of the secretariat should be expanded and Mitrevski was reinstated.

On April 1, 1949, the Executive Committee of the NOF chose Mitrevski as its new president, on the initiative of Zachariadis. On April 5, Mitrevski was appointed as the Minister for Food in the Provisional Government along with Krste Kačev who was appointed as the Director of National Minorities in the Ministry of the Interior. After the Greek Civil War, on October 3, Mitrevski was arrested by the KKE on the accusation that he was agent of Tito in Burrel, Albania, and transferred to the Soviet Union. There he was sentenced to 25 years in prison for "crimes against the international workers' movement" and sent to do hard labour at a camp in Vorkuta. In 1955, he returned to the Socialist Republic of Macedonia in the Socialist Federal Republic of Yugoslavia. He died on February 11, 1978, in Skopje, SFR Yugoslavia.
