= Lazar Poptraykov =

Bulgarian revolutionary and writer

Voivode Lazar Poptraykov
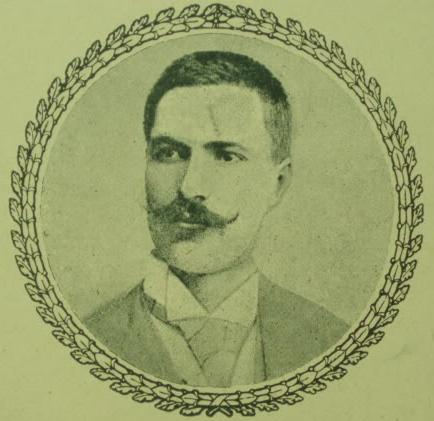
- A portrait of Lazar Poptraykov
- Native name: Лазар Поптрайков
- Born: 10 April 1878; Dambeni, Monastir Vilayet, Ottoman Empire (now Dendrochori, Greece)
- Died: 11/12 October 1903
- Allegiance: IMRO
- Service years: 1896-1903
- Conflicts: Ilinden Uprising †
- Alma mater: Bulgarian Men's High School of Thessaloniki
- Other work: Teacher; Poet

Lazar Poptraykov (Bulgarian: Лазар Поптрайков; Macedonian: Лазар Поп-Трајков; 10 April 1878 – 11/12 October 1903) was a Bulgarian revolutionary (komitadji). He was also a Bulgarian Exarchate teacher and poet from Ottoman Macedonia. He was a leader (voivode) of the Internal Macedonian-Adrianople Revolutionary Organization (IMARO) in the region of Kastoria (Kostur) and participated in the Ilinden Uprising, where he was killed.

== Life ==
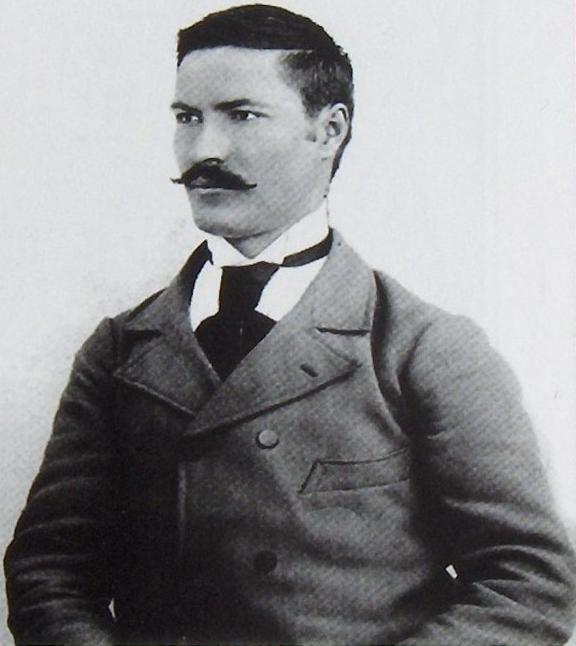
Lazar Poptraykov.

Lazar Poptraykov was born in Dambeni, Ottoman Empire (now Dendrohori, Greece), on 10 April 1878. After completing his primary education in his native village, he continued to study at the Bitola Bulgarian Classical High School and afterwards at Thessaloniki's Bulgarian Men's High School. In Thessaloniki, one of his teachers was Pere Toshev. Poptraykov joined IMARO as early as 1895, inspired by Dame Gruev. Gruev initiated him and Kuzo Popstefov while they were attending the gymnasium. Per historian Douglas Dakin, Poptraykov was expelled from the Thessaloniki gymnasium for working against a teacher, however the Exarchist school inspector reconciled both of them and Poptraykov was returned after Poptraykov had complained in Sofia. In the academic year 1896/1897, he and Kuzo Popstefov were leading in the propaganda work for IMARO. During the holidays, they toured the villages in Kostur and were able to enlist people from almost every village of the region. In 1897, he published the folklore-essay study titled "The Position of the Bride in the Boy's House". He finished the Bulgarian Men's High School of Thessaloniki in the academic year 1897/1898. After his graduation, he was appointed as a teacher in his native village, working in 1898/1899. He continued touring the surrounding villages, attempting to gain people for the revolutionary cause.

Poptraykov was one of the founders of the Kastoria branch of IMARO, establishing the first revolutionary committees there. In 1898, Pavel Hristov arrived in the region of Kostur, and Poptraykov enrolled small bands in the villages around Zagoritsani, Dambeni and Korestia along with him. In July 1899, Poptraykov and an associate killed the mukhtar of Zagoritsani. In the same year, he and an associate were arrested in Chereshnitsa, while on a tour of Popoli. They were arrested for failing to greet Ottoman gendarme, which resulted in the discovery of their revolvers and incriminating documents. Pavel Hristov bribed the authorities for the return of the documents before they could be read. The Ottoman authorities sent him to the prison in Klisura, from where they sent him to Kostur. Poptraykov was sentenced to prison for two years in Korcë due to the insistence of a local bey. He passed the time in prison reading, playing a violin, and learning from Albanian prisoners their language and arranging with them the transport of weapons through Albanian channels. During his imprisonment, the Organization in Kostur was led by Pavel Hristov, Kuzo Stefov and Mikhail Nikolov. Towards the end of October 1901, Poptraykov was released from prison, having served his sentence. As he was suffering from hernia, Gotse Delchev recommended to him to go to Bulgaria where he could both have surgery and recruit voivodes in the region. He went to Bulgaria for treatment and with Delchev's assistance, he found Georgi Papanchev from Sliven and Nikola Andreev from Mokreni. After his arrest in September 1902, he was amnestied on 16 February 1903, after which he became, together with Manol Rozov, the leader of the detachments in the Kostur region. He participated in the work of the Smilevo Congress and was elected as Anastas Lozanchev's deputy in the Main Headquarters of the Bitola revolutionary district. On 21 June 1903, he wrote a commemorative poem titled Lokvata and Vinyari (Bulgarian: Локвата и Виняри) to commemorate the battle of Lokvata fought on 31 May 1903 between Bulgarian revolutionaries and Ottoman troops in Dambeni shortly prior to the Ilinden Uprising. The poem was influential and over time the battle was celebrated by Slavic-speaking inhabitants of Dambeni, who attributed it as heroic and mythical. He participated in the Ilinden Uprising as a district commander of Kostur, during which he had battles with the Ottoman army. During the uprising, Poptraykov with 600 men sacked the Pomak village of Zervaini, the Albanian village of Biglista (in retaliation for an Albanian attack on Smardesh) and Kapestitsa. In a battle near the village Čanište against the Ottomans on 2 October, he was shot in the mouth.

== Death ==
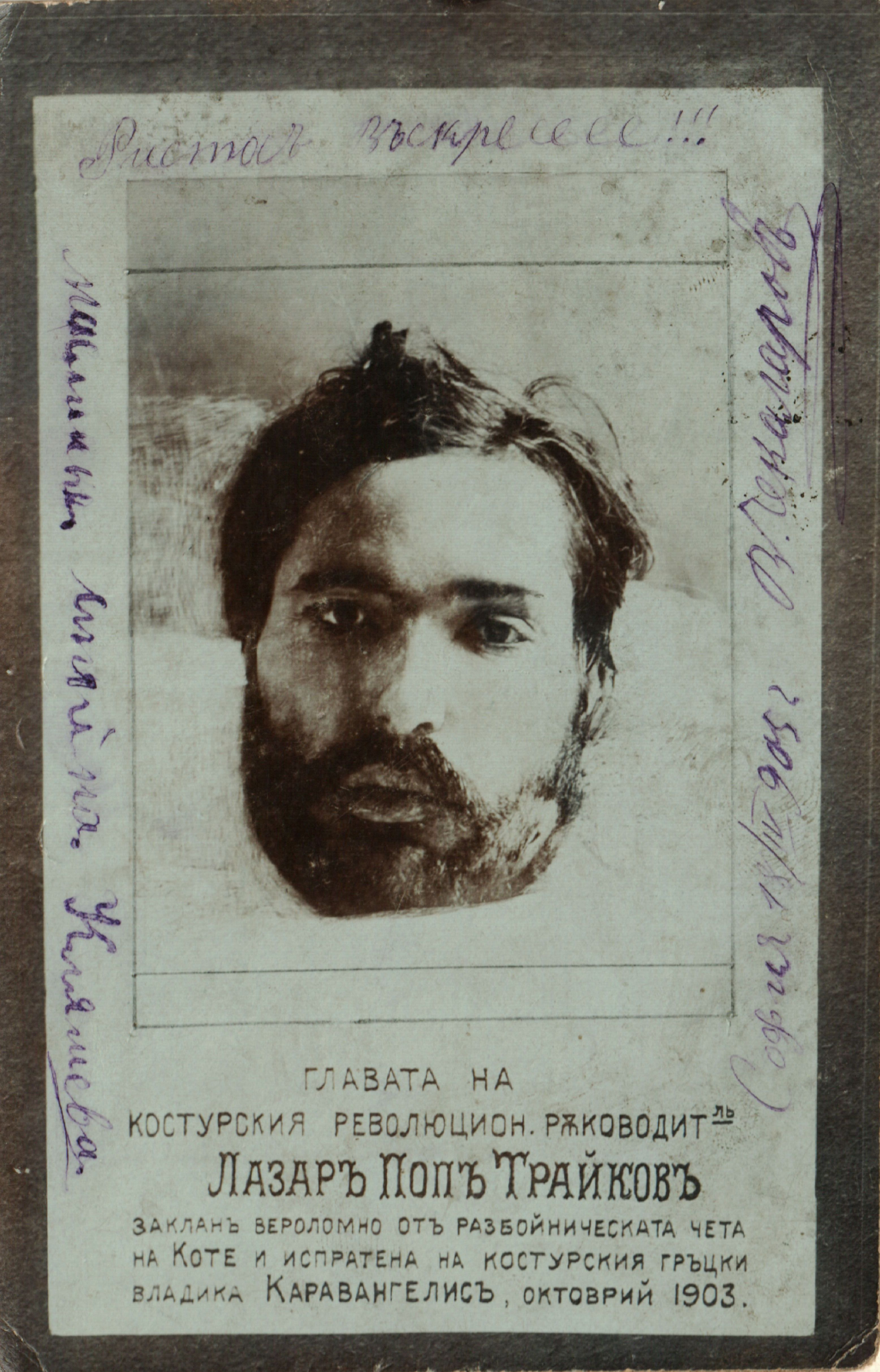
The severed head of Lazar Poptraykov, c. 1903

He returned to Kostur wounded after the battle with the Ottomans. Poptraykov was killed on 11/12 October at the end of the Ilinden Uprising on the orders of the Greek bishop of Kostur, Germanos Karavangelis. According to Dakin, Konstantinos Christou, a fighter for Macedonian Committee and former member of IMARO, sent men to kill Poptraykov in Chalara. Per Karavangelis, Christou's men found Poptraykov, who was wounded, on a mountain. On the other hand, per IMARO member Hristo Silyanov, the wounded Poptraykov took refuge with Christou and was killed by him personally. This version was supported by historian Mercia MacDermott. Poptraykov's head was cut off and sent to Karavangelis, who took a picture of it on his desk. Karavangelis spread the picture around the villages in Kostur to intimidate the locals. Per the Macedonian Encyclopedia, Karavangelis gave Christou 50 Ottoman liras. According to Karavangelis, Poptraykov was the worst enemy of Hellenism, who turned the peasants in favor of the Bulgarian national idea. When narrating his memoirs to author Penelope Delta in the 1930s, Karavangelis requested the concealment of the information that Poptraykov's head had been buried in the garden of the Metropolitan Cathedral of Kastoria, lest "the Bulgarians cause mayhem to find it and lay it to rest with great honors, if they find out".

== Literature ==
- Лазар Поптрайков - "Възстанието в Костурско; от 20 юлий до 30 август вкл.", публикувано в "Бюлетин на в. Автономия; Задграничен лист на Вътрешната македоно-одринска организация", брой 44-47, София, 1903 година Report about the revolt in Kostur written by Lazar Poptraykov, Vasil Chakalarov, Manol Rozov, Pando Klyashev and Mihail Nikolov
