= Mitre the Vlach =

Aromanian revolutionary in Ottoman Macedonia

Voivode Mitre the Vlach
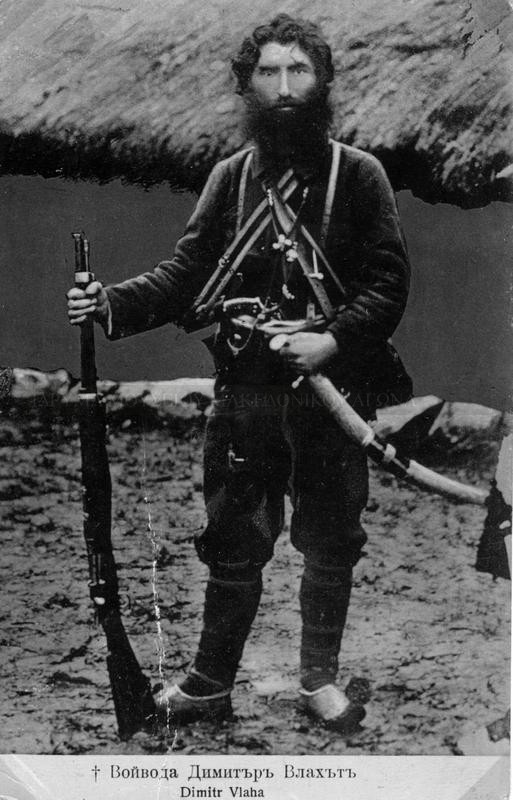
- Mitre the Vlach c. 1903
- Born: Mitre Pangiaru c. 1873; Konomladi, Monastir Vilayet, Ottoman Empire (now Greece)
- Died: 5 March 1907 Zoupanitsa, Monastir Vilayet, Ottoman Empire (now Greece)
- Buried: Aposkepos, Greece
- Allegiance: IMRO
- Commands: Commander-in-chief of the region of Kostenariya
- Conflicts: Ilinden–Preobrazhenie Uprising; Macedonian Struggle †

Mitre Pangiaru, better known as Mitre the Vlach (Bulgarian: Митре Панджаров — Влаха, Macedonian: Митре Панџаров — Влаот) and Mitros Vlach, was аn Aromanian revolutionary of the Internal Macedonian Revolutionary Organization. He was a revolutionary leader in the region of Kastoria.

== Life ==
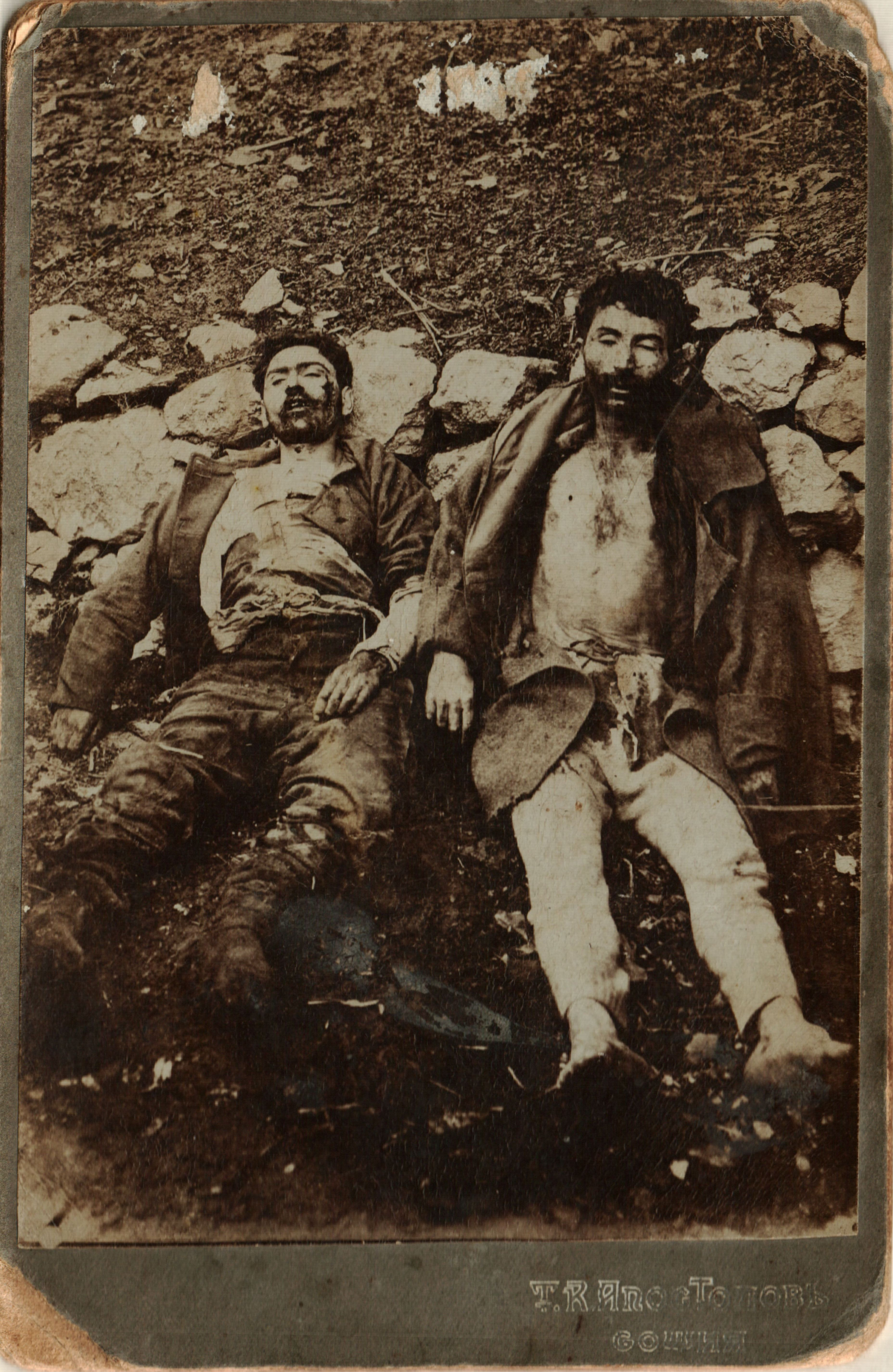
The body of Mitre the Vlach and one of his men c. 1907

He was born in 1873 in Konomladi in Ottoman Macedonia, to Farsherot Aromanian parents from Plasë (Aromanian: Pleasa or Pliasa). Like his father, Mitre worked as a shepherd. He was a member of the first revolutionary band in the Kastoria region, created by Pavel Hristov in May 1900. As a member of bands, he became literate and always carried revolutionary literature. His courage earned him notoriety in Kastoria. In 1901, together with his brothers Atanas and Nume, Mitre was a member of Vasil Chekalarov's band. In January 1902, during Internal Macedonian Revolutionary Organization's leader Gotse Delchev's observation in Kastoria, he was appointed as the leader of a band in Koreshtata. In June 1902, he went with Chekalarov to revive the Organization at Nestram, after which they moved into Kastanochori, where the rural guards were Ottoman Turks. Mitre terrorized the guards and managed to distribute weapons in the area. Before the Ilinden Uprising, Mitre was appointed as the leader of a band in the same area, consisting of 150 members. He fought against Greek bands in Kastoria on a number of occasions. His base, Staritsani (Lakkomata), was subject to attacks by Greek bands.

His rival, Greek bishop Germanos Karavangelis, sent a letter to him under a fake name, offering him residence in Greece, a monthly salary and a free education for his sons, with chances to become officers in the Greek army. Mitre declined the offer, said that he received weapons from Bulgarian prince Ferdinand and advised the sender to not oppose the Bulgarian Committee, otherwise "he would send his skin to Kastoria." Relying on intel, Karavangelis advised the Ottomans to surround the village Zoupanitsa at night, giving Hristo from Sistevo as a guide. Mitre was killed, along with members of his band, by the Ottomans on 5 March 1907. Mitre was buried in the village Aposkep together with his entire band.
