= Kranionas =

- Community
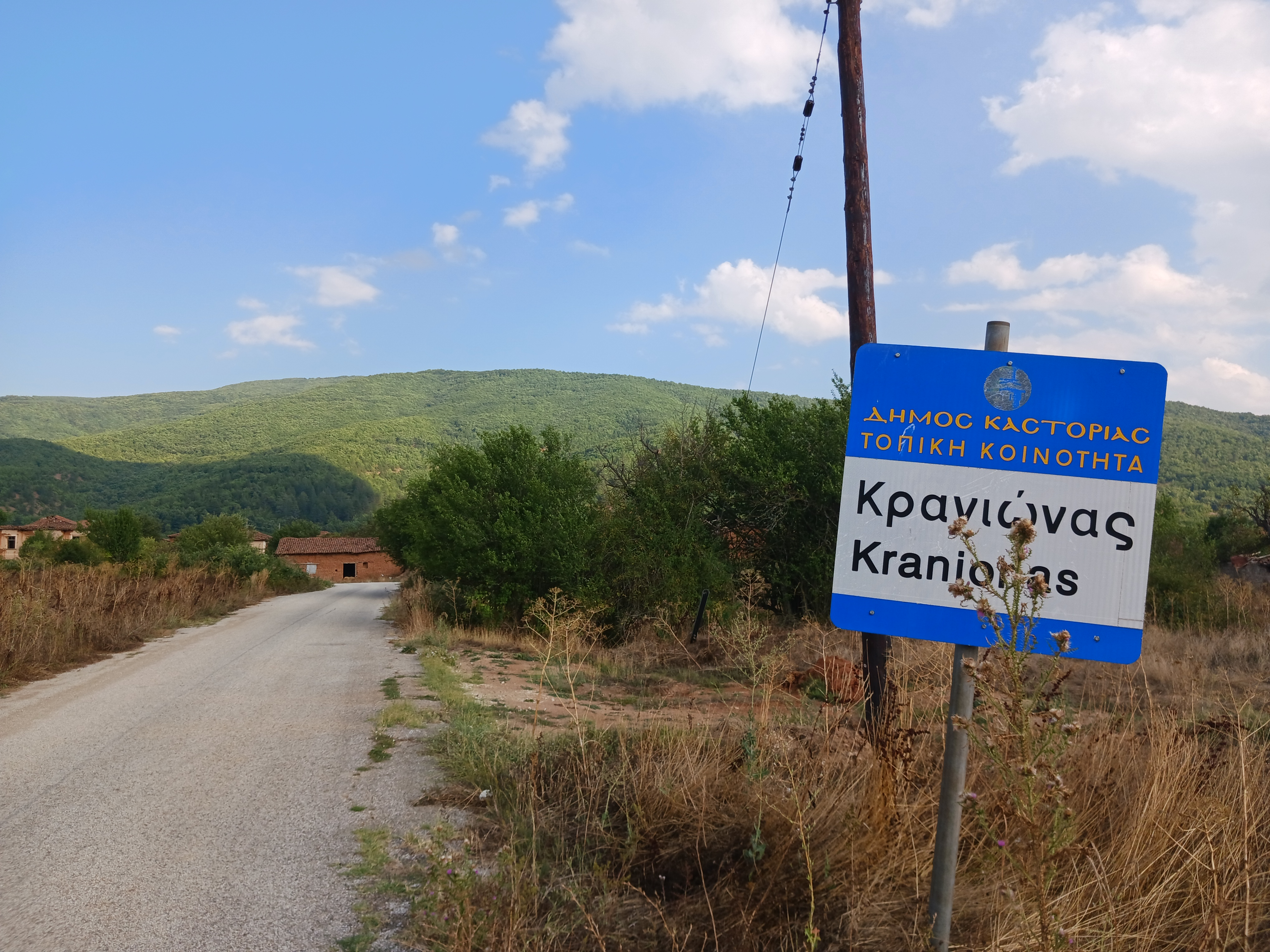
- Kranionas

- Location within Greece
- Coordinates: 40°37′9″N 21°12′48″E
- Country: Greece
- Geographic region: Macedonia
- Administrative region: Western Macedonia
- Regional unit: Kastoria
- Municipality: Kastoria
- Municipal unit: Korestia

Population (2021)
  - Community: 2
- Time zone: UTC+2 (EET)
  - Summer (DST): UTC+3 (EEST)

Kranionas (Greek: Κρανιώνας, before 1926: Δρανοβαίνη – Dranovaini; Bulgarian/Macedonian: Дреновени - Drenoveni) is a village and a community in Kastoria Regional Unit, Western Macedonia, Greece.

The residents spoke the Dolna Korèshcha variant of the Kostur dialect. The village consisted of two separate parts: Gorna (Upper) Maala (Quarter) and Dolna (Lower) Maala, separated by one kilometer, with the village river running between the quarters.

In mid–1941 Kranionas along with Slavic Macedonian inhabitants from several villages partook in a celebration commemorating the Battle of Lokvata, fought by Bulgarian revolutionaries (Komitadjis) against Ottoman soldiers in 1903.

In 1945, Greek Foreign Minister Ioannis Politis ordered the compilation of demographic data regarding the Prefecture of Kastoria. The village Kranionas had a total of 623 inhabitants, populated by 60 Slavophones.
