= Chiliodendro =

- Community
- Location within Greece
- Coordinates: 40°29′14″N 21°11′29″E
- Country: Greece
- Geographic region: Macedonia
- Administrative region: Western Macedonia
- Regional unit: Kastoria
- Municipality: Kastoria
- Municipal unit: Agia Triada

Population (2021)
  - Community: 567
- Time zone: UTC+2 (EET)
  - Summer (DST): UTC+3 (EEST)

Chiliodendro (Greek: Χιλιόδενδρο, before 1927: Ζελήνη – Zelini) is a village in Kastoria Regional Unit, Macedonia, Greece.

The 1920 Greek census recorded 457 people in the village, and 150 inhabitants (70 families) were Muslim in 1923. Following the Greek–Turkish population exchange, Greek refugee families in Zelini were from Asia Minor (23) and Pontus (12) in 1926. The 1928 Greek census recorded 440 village inhabitants. In 1928, the refugee families numbered 35 (140 people).

In 1945, Greek Foreign Minister Ioannis Politis ordered the compilation of demographic data regarding the Prefecture of Kastoria. The village Chiliodendro had a total of 649 inhabitants, and was populated by 325 Slavophones with a Bulgarian national consciousness.
