= Mitrevski =

Mitrevski (feminine Mitrevska) is a surname. Notable people with the surname include:

- Chris Mitrevski (born 1996), Australian long jumper
- Darko Mitrevski (born 1971), Macedonian film director
- Nikola Mitrevski (born 1985) Macedonian handball player
- Paskal Mitrevski (1912–1978), Greek communist partisan
- Radoslav Mitrevski (born 1981), Bulgarian footballer
- Risto Mitrevski (born 1991), Macedonian footballer
- Tanja Mitrevska (born 1987), Macedonian footballer

== See also ==
- Mitreski, surname
