= Fertek =

Settlement in Turkey

- Neighbourhood
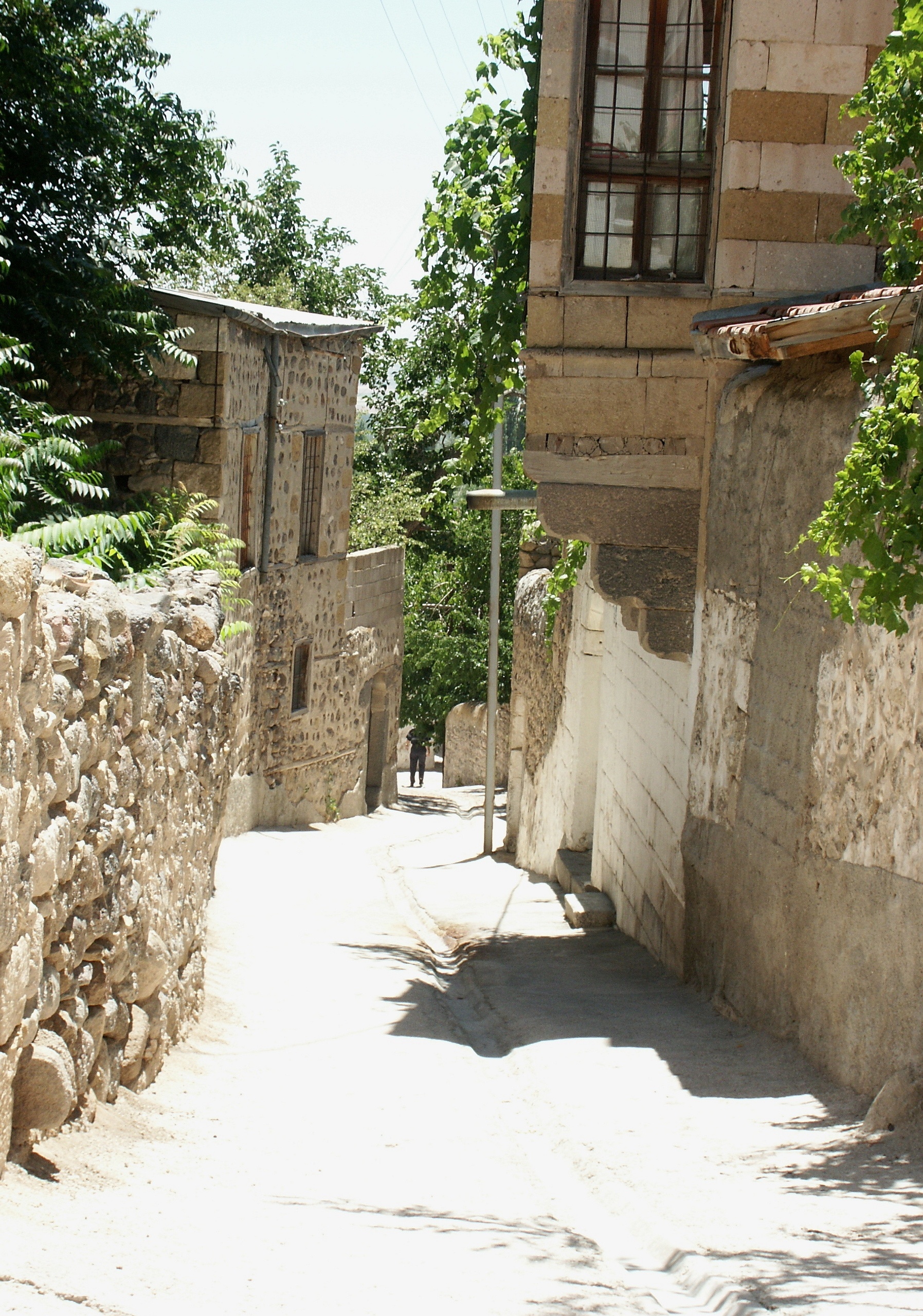
- street in Fertek

- Location within Turkey Location within Turkey Central Anatolia
- Coordinates: 37°58′N 34°37′E
- Country: Turkey
- Province: Niğde
- District: Niğde
- Municipality: Niğde
- Elevation: 1,270 m (4,170 ft)
- Population (2022): 9,287
- Time zone: UTC+3 (TRT)
- Postal code: 51000
- Area code: 0388

Fertek is a neighbourhood of the city of Niğde in the Niğde Province, Turkey. Its population is 9,287 (2022). Before the 2013 reorganisation, it was a town (belde). It has a history going back to the 3rd century, starting with the settlement of Karamanlides. The town went through Byzantine, Seljuk, and Ottoman histories.

== History ==
In Turkish, Arabic, and Persian, the word "Rum" refers to Rome and the Romans. Thus, the Greeks living in Fertek were referred to as Rum, by the Turks. Rum also implies the continuity of the ancient Roman Empire in the Byzantine millennium, as well as meaning "Romans of Asia Minor". However, the Greeks living in Fertek referred to themselves as "Karamanlides, meaning Greeks of Karaman. Karamanlides. Thus, in this article, the Greek Orthodox community, or Rum, is referred to as Karamanlides.

=== Early history ===
There is no strong evidence as to when exactly was Fertek settled. From the existence of the "underground city", the beginnings are traced to 3rd and 4th centuries, when the town started as an underground city like the ones in Capadocia to the north. Due to the similarities of the Capadocia settlements, it is assumed that the origins of Fertek is around the same period with the settlement of Karamanlides. Historical structures present clues for other settlements: the Omer Aga Mosque was built in 1669, which indicates that Muslims settled long before that. The main church was built in 1835, thus there must have been a large congregation to have a need and build the church. However, there are no known records indicating any settlements between the early periods, and the 19th century. It is assumed that the Karamanlides who were living in the Capaddocia, subject to persecution of the "aga", ran away to come and settle in Fertek.Fertek (Fertakaina) Tarihine bir bakış 1/Tarih/milliyet blog

Although the name of Fertek has remained unchanged since the Roman and Byzantine periods, it has been called by 8 different variations. During Byzantine period, the name of the town was Fertakaina, Fertaki, or Fertakion. Other names used were Fertekina, Fertaina, Fertikköy, and Bartakina. Among these names, Fertekina and Bartakina are the names given to Fertek by the villagers living in the area. The name Fertakaina is seen in religious sources and educational books. Subsequent to the exchange of Karamanlides and Turkish populations in 1923, the village was officially renamed as Aydınyurt. However, the town kept its original name Fertek; even in official records Fertek was used. Aydinyurt never gained acceptance. It is not known exactly where the name Fertek comes from; there are no reliable sources nor documents referring to its origins. There has been some local hearsay and efforts of etymology to define the source, however none are believed to be conclusive nor definitive.

Since the Byzantine and Ottoman periods, settlements in Fertek are in three regions referred to as the Upper, Lower and Middle regions. Recently a new region has been added mostly by outsiders moving into Fertek, which is around the historic bath.

=== Departure of The Karamanlides ===
The harmony of the Karamanlides and the locals living together changed when Greeks invaded western Turkey in 1919. Karamanlides celebrated the invasion and frequently expressed that they would soon join their ancestors. The bells of the church in Fertek rang till late hours of the night as part of the celebration. As the counter-offensive by Turks in Sakarya battle ended with Turkish victory, the celebrations ended in Fertek.

After the Independence war and declaration of the Republic of Turkey, Greek population in Turkey was exchanged with the Turkish population in Greece in 1924 Exchange of Greek and Turkish Populations. As a result, the Karamanlides population left Fertek for Greece through the bath (hamam) road in a very sad heart-breaking manner, many crying and against their wishes. Conversely, Turks from the Greek villages of Zelegosdi in Kastoria were moved and settled in Fertek – in fact, the area that they settled is referred to as the "migrant" district.

Descendants of the Karamanlides who left Fertek, occasionally come and visit, where the locals are always pleased to host and meet those who had connections to Fertek.

=== Regiment in preparation for the Independence War ===
Fertek sent a Regiment to Battle of Sakarya. The captain of this regiment was housed in the current residence of Enver Koc. The bath (hamam) was the training camp and sleeping quarters for the Regiment. After the completing their training in Fertek, the Regiment left for the Sakarya battlefield through the road from (bath) hamam towards the town of Bor, as the people of Fertek cried and prayed for them, knowing many would not return. Several years later, the Karamanlides would leave Fertek taking the same road with the same sadness. It is not known when the regiment reached the battlefield, nor their whereabouts thereafter.

=== Current trends ===
As with urbanization of many settlements in Turkey, Fertek is on the same trend. The life cycle started as a settlement around the 3rd century as a village. Then Fertek was designated as a township, later became a village again, then a town; now Fertek is a district of Nigde. The Turkish community learned, farming, wine making, raki producing and many other skills from the Karamanlides. But the greatest inheritance of the Turkish community from the Karamanlides were the culture and education. For many years, Fertek produced its own food through farming and vegetation, and was able sustain the needs of its community. As the population could no longer meet its economic needs, they started sending their youngsters to the big cities for higher education. As the number of the educated class increased, they started taking jobs in bigger cities, thus started population departure, and the decline of farming, wine and raki production in Fertek. Due to its proximity to Nigde, great weather, and greenery, new settlers are coming to Fertek. Also, some who had departed earlier are returning to Fertek as they retire. The new population increased the demand for housing, roads, and other amenities that are needed to sustain a community. The fields used for farming and vineyards used to make raki that fed generations are no longer farmed, only to become backyards for the new houses built on them., The paths that donkeys went on turned into highways. Eventually, Fertek has transformed from a "producing" community into a "consuming" one.

== Geography ==
Fertek is almost merged with Niğde, the distance between Fertek and Niğde city center is being about 7 kilometres (4.3 mi). The town is situated at the eastern slopes of the mountains with an altitude of about 1,270 metres (4,170 ft).

Fertek is a charming town in the middle of the Anatolian steppe, displaying shades of green through its vineyards and gardens. It's like an oasis in the middle of the desert that appeared as a mirage in front of Yusuf, Kerem and Majnun. It is a beautiful residential area surrounded by fruit orchards and vineyards. Many claim that its climate and water rejuvenate people living there. A town that lived through the Roman and Byzantine eras, gave examples of civilized life in the Seljuk-Ottoman era, and preserved its existence until today with its historical artifacts from those periods. It is a town that exposes history with its houses, streets, bridges, bath, church, which is being used as a mosque, holy water, school, fountains, and underground city that bear the characteristics of Byzantine architecture.

Fertek is one of the Cappadocia settlements located in the Niğde plateau leaning on the Melendiz Mountains, between the Taurus Mountains, and Aladağlar. It resembles other settlements in the Cappadocia region. As was the case in Cappadocia, the settlement in Fertek started with small, independent houses carved into the rocks interconnected by tunnels, in the early ages. Over time, as civilization developed, houses were built above ground, and old underground houses transformed to be used as cellars. Today, traces of these old rock-cut houses as cellars are still visible.

== Population ==
We have the following limited information as estimates collected from old records:

Source	Year	Total Population	Christians	Muslims
Konya Records	19th century	1980 with 500 households		
Konya Records	19th century (township)	2968 with 947 household		
	1895	2500	1200	1300
	1905	4000	1500	2500
census	2011	1020		
census	2017	9000		

In 1872, based on the Nevahi edict of the Ottoman Empire, Fertek became a township, which included 9 villages all together of which the major ones were: Adırmusun, (Koyunlu), Delmisun (Hançerli), İlisun (Küçükköy) and Fesleğen and records were kept as such.

Special privileges were extended to Karamanlides living in Turkey after the Greek Revolt of 1829, followed by the Tanzimat Edict in 1839, and the Reform Edict in 1856. After these, Grekization of the Christian subjects in Turkey started.

== Education ==
Today, Fertek is known to have high concentration of college educated people, which is rare for that part of the country. Perhaps, as a result of this, Fertek was renamed Aydin Yurt, (Intellectual Town) in 1923. The known origins of education in Fertek, goes back to first half of the 19th century. Although the exact dates are not known, neighborhood schools were established, most likely before 1852. We assume that the Karamanlides community had educational facilities long before Muslims had their own; we base this upon the high-level knowledge and skills Karamanlides demonstrated. These schools were located next to the mosque and inside the church. Perhaps having its own school early in the 20th century contributed for Fertek community thrive for a higher level of education more so than other regions in the area. The need and desire for higher education evolved to be a significant part of the Fertek culture during the Republican period. Today, it is a fairly well known that Fertek has produced many physicians, pharmacists, judges, prosecutors, lawyers, enough teachers to meet the needs of all Niğde schools, dozens of governors, district mayors, officers, non-commissioned officers, engineers, and administrators. Fertek takes a pride in providing such resources to the country.

== Cuisine ==
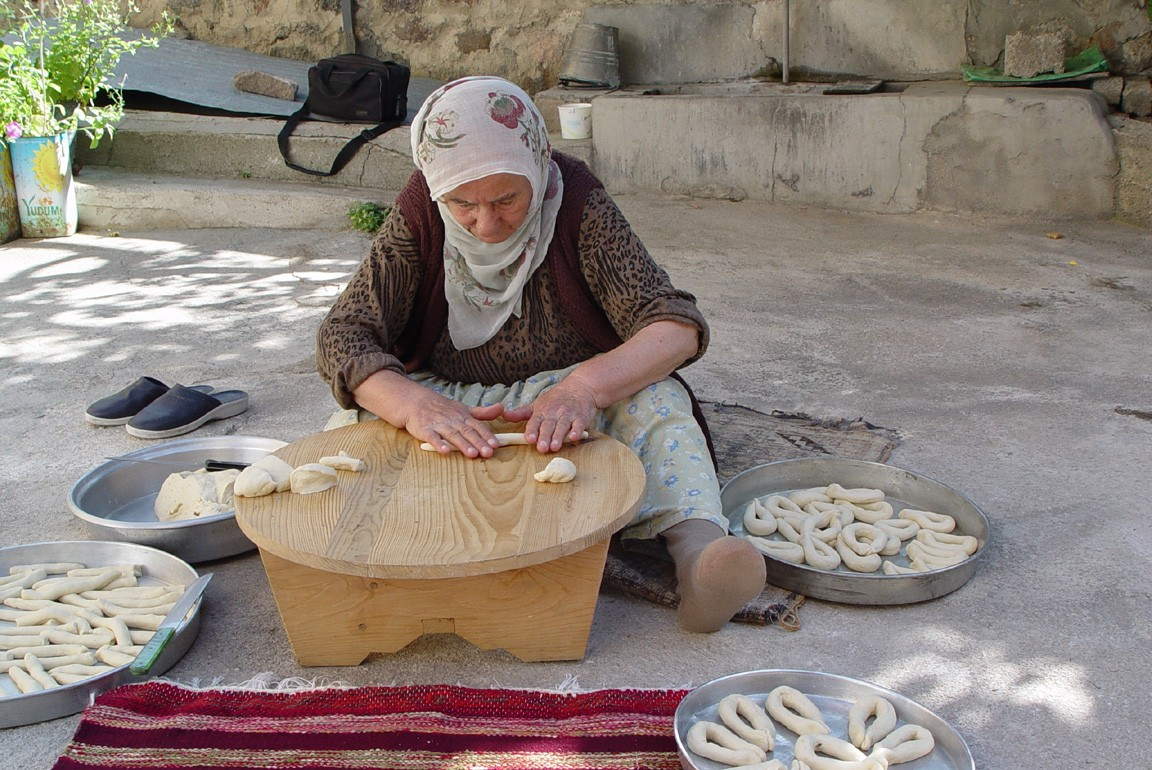
Preparing halka to be baked in tandir

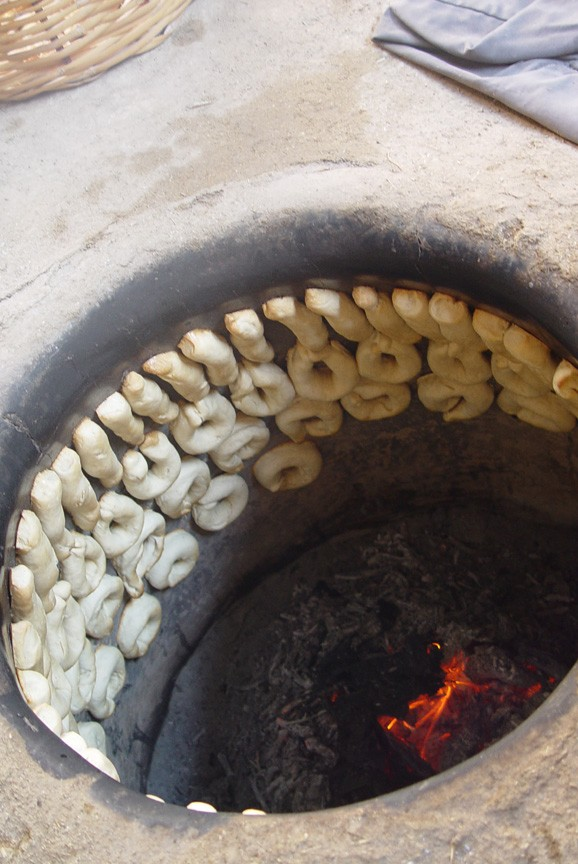
Halka being baked in tandir

As Fertek leaves behind its heritage of culinary culture through the modernizations of our times, it is reminiscent in the minds of many, how the smells of tandoori bread, and "halka" with its oily (pamuk yagi – cotton oil) and milky bread, used to spread from house to house. In addition to these tandoor breads, kavut made with plain, meaty and pastrami and mixed with grape molasses, baked beans made in pots, stuffed meat made in pots, kelles, dücük soup, gicika, mumbar, bossulus, stuffed sugar pare, roasted sugar pare with walnuts, molasses halva, and molasses continue today, albeit in decline. Another important product made in Fertek was wine. Grapes were crushed in large containers manually to make wine, especially for the ceremonies at the church, and to be consumed by the general public. Also, during the fall season, every house made their own processed meat products (sucuk, pastirma), similar to sausage and bacon. The importance of this is obvious in their saying, "may God not leave any house without sucuk and pastirma".

== Karamanlides life ==
The Muslim community and the Karamanlides lived together in harmony in Fertek. Karamanlides’ lives were plain and simple, but considered somewhat luxurious given the era they lived in. Karamanlides, especially the young women, paid attention to their clothing, and always dressed up nicely. Karamanlides were engaged with trade, farming, and held official positions in the government. They used to live in Fertek but conducted their trade mostly in Istanbul. Farming, vegetation, and vineyards were valued highly. The high walls that the Karamanlides built around their vineyards that survived to our date, is a symbol of the importance they placed on vineyards. The raki that they produced from grapes was their livelihood. Many of the vineyards also had wells. The water from the wells were used for irrigation through the water collectors to contain and distribute water to the vineyards. Some residues of these wells and water collectors have survived to our time and are still visible. To ensure continual flow of water to vineyards in Fertek, Karamanlides signed a treaty with the village of Hancerli, where every night water from Hancerli would be diverted to the "upper lake" in Fertek to fill it up till the morning. During the daytime, water collected in the upper lake was distributed into the plantations and vegetations in Fertek. This is a major inheritance that the Karamanlides left for the Muslims, where they thrived with this water source for many years thereafter, to water their gardens and vineyards.

Karamanlides were involved with trade as well as holding high positions in the government offices in Nigde. Every morning, Karamanlides would travel to Nigde on their well-groomed donkeys. Fertek was the cultural center of this region. They would organize cultural events, meet regularly to exchange ideas to improve themselves, and also to help the local Muslims. Back then, the locals were referred to as "muslims", not as Turks (note by Hayati Soykan). The locals were workers in the vineyards and gardens owned by the Karamanlides. The economic, social, and cultural structures of the locals were not as developed as Karamanlides. This could be another indicator that the locals had settled in Fertek long after the Karamanlides did.

Karamanlides community in Fertek to wrote and spoke Turkish in their daily lives, religious practices and educational activities. Greek alphabet was used in their writings. They have adopted many Turkish names for themselves, like Bayram, Karaca, Süleyman, Süllüoğlu, Kurtoğlu. Karamanlides considered themselves as Turks; in fact during the Battle of Manzikert - Wikipedia (Malazgirt) in 1071, Karamanlides realized that the army they were fighting against spoke Turkish; upon which they switched sides and contributed to victory of Seljuk leader Alp Arslan.

The following were the principles of the Karamanlides community in Fertek before the Republic of Turkey was established:

1. Harelem Efendi – lived in the house currently occupied by Recai Varol's sister, Zehra. He was a finance officer in the government in Nigde.
2. Cita Bodos – lived in the house currently occupied by Sadi Soykan, son of Nurettin Soykan (uncle of Hayati Soykan). He was a farmer. This house has a large courtyard and rooms with high ceilings. The house has a separate door for the people, and another door for the animals (cattle, sheep, donkey, etc.). The stable was at the lower floor of the house, with the door opening towards the back street. It is interesting to note how they paid attention to their living standards.
3. Kurdoglu – lived in the house currently occupied by Mustafa of Enes. He used to produce raki.
4. Chicken Farmer Bodos – lived in the house currently occupied by Ali of Tat Hakki. He used to produce raki.
5. Hariton – He used to operate a mill located at near the road to Bor, near the meadows.
6. Kozmomdis – lived in the house currently occupied by Abdi from Gede. This house is located on the road to the bath (hamam). He was a representative at the local Ottoman government. He was well known and respected by the Ottoman officials. Once, as he was coming home from an official government business, carpets were rolled out all the way from Bor intersection to his house. The current road to Nigde did not exist back then; it was built by the brigade that was trained in Fertek to join the Independence war.
7. Sarrafoglu – lived in the house currently occupied by Esat Hodja. He used to trade gold in Istanbul, thus the nickname, "sarraf”.

The houses that the Karamanlides built were well thought out and designed to maximize living conditions. This manifests itself by touring a few houses still standing. Main doors were large and mounted on single solid piece stones on both sides. Stones always had some motifs carved on them. The main door would open into a large courtyard. The floors of the court yards were covered with cut-stones fitted together to allow for easy cleaning. The rooms on the entrance floor had high ceilings with carved wooden doors. These rooms were designed and positioned to be cool in the hot days of the summer by providing natural breeze.

== Vineyard harvest and raki ==
Fertek has been famous for its vineyards from the Ottoman period to the present day. Each year, towards the end of August, grapes were harvested and laid to dry in the vineyards. The Karamanlides would give a prizes to those who would present the first ripe grapes of the season. Because the grapes would eventually be used to produce Raki, the prizes only went to red grapes. Harvest preparations included getting the barrels ready for shipment; for this, the Karamanlides would place the barrels into the "lower lake". After a period being in water, the wooden barrels would expand to become airtight to contain raki for shipment. Today, the lower lake is next to the Lake Casino and Tea Garden, which is still functioning.

In September, after the harvest, the grapes would be crushed in large vineyard containers, and the musts were thrown into cauldrons with molasses and kept overnight. The next day, the musts were moved from the cauldrons into large bowls and then slowly boiled to make molasses. Meanwhile, while molasses was being boiled, sweets were made from these fruits by adding apples, quince, pumpkin, and walnuts. After molasses was made, "köfter" was also made by mixing it with must and starch.

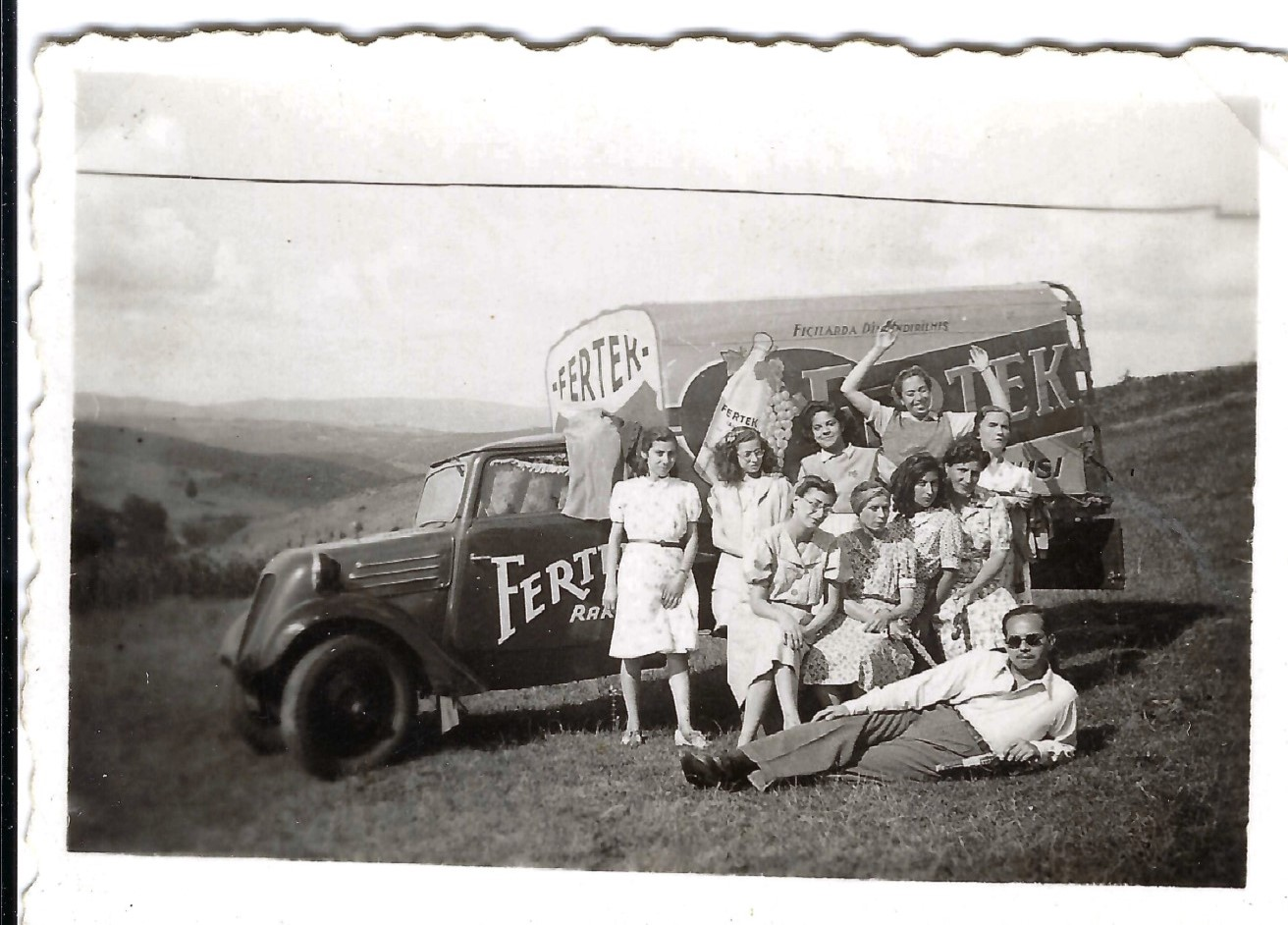
Raki truck

The most important product symbolized and branded by Fertek is of course the "Fertek Rakısı". Fertek was well known to be one of the locations to produce the highest quality of raki during the Ottoman period, from the end of the 19th century to the beginnings of the 20th century. Raki distilleries were found in many houses; once produced, barrels would be e filled with raki. Then the barrels would either be shipped to be sold or kept for general consumption. As per hearsay, raki from Fertek was not only famous in Turkey, but it was also well known in Europe. Some of the raki would be shipped to other European cities. [In a novel by Halit Ziya Usakligil, there is an episode where people were gathered around a table and enjoying their meal, when they ran out of drink, they would not order another raki, rather they would say to the server "get me another Fertek."]. Karamanlides had a decent income from this trade. At those times raki was manufactured in special facilities in the Karamanlides houses in Fertek. The best and the most volumes of raki were produced at the house of Karamanlides Kurdoglu family; this house was most recently owned by grocery store owner Mustafa of Enes.

This mastic raki, made with the aroma of chewing gum produced from plain or kenger plant in Fertek, was advertised in the newspapers in Istanbul. As the raki shipments arrived in Istanbul, they were taken to Eminönü Balıkpazarı (fish market). There, it was sold wholesale or retail by the Karamanlides brokers. Clientele from well to do neighborhoods would prefer to buy Fertek raki at these locations.

Also, there were taverns in Istanbul operated by the Karamanlides to serve "Fertek Rakısı". Those who operated these taverns were either from Feretek or had strong connections with Fertek. Of course, the most famous of these was the "Fertek Tavern", which was located in Istanbul Eminönü Balıkpazarı; it was a wine and raki warehouse. Almost all of the regulars of Fertek Tavern were poets, writers and composers. There was no place to sit, no set tables. Everyone would come with their own appetizers such as an apple, pear, some roasted chickpeas, olives and bread and drank at the counter standing up. Fertek Tavern, which opened in 1890, was sadly closed in 1908.

== Historical structures ==
=== Public fountain – Haci Osman ===
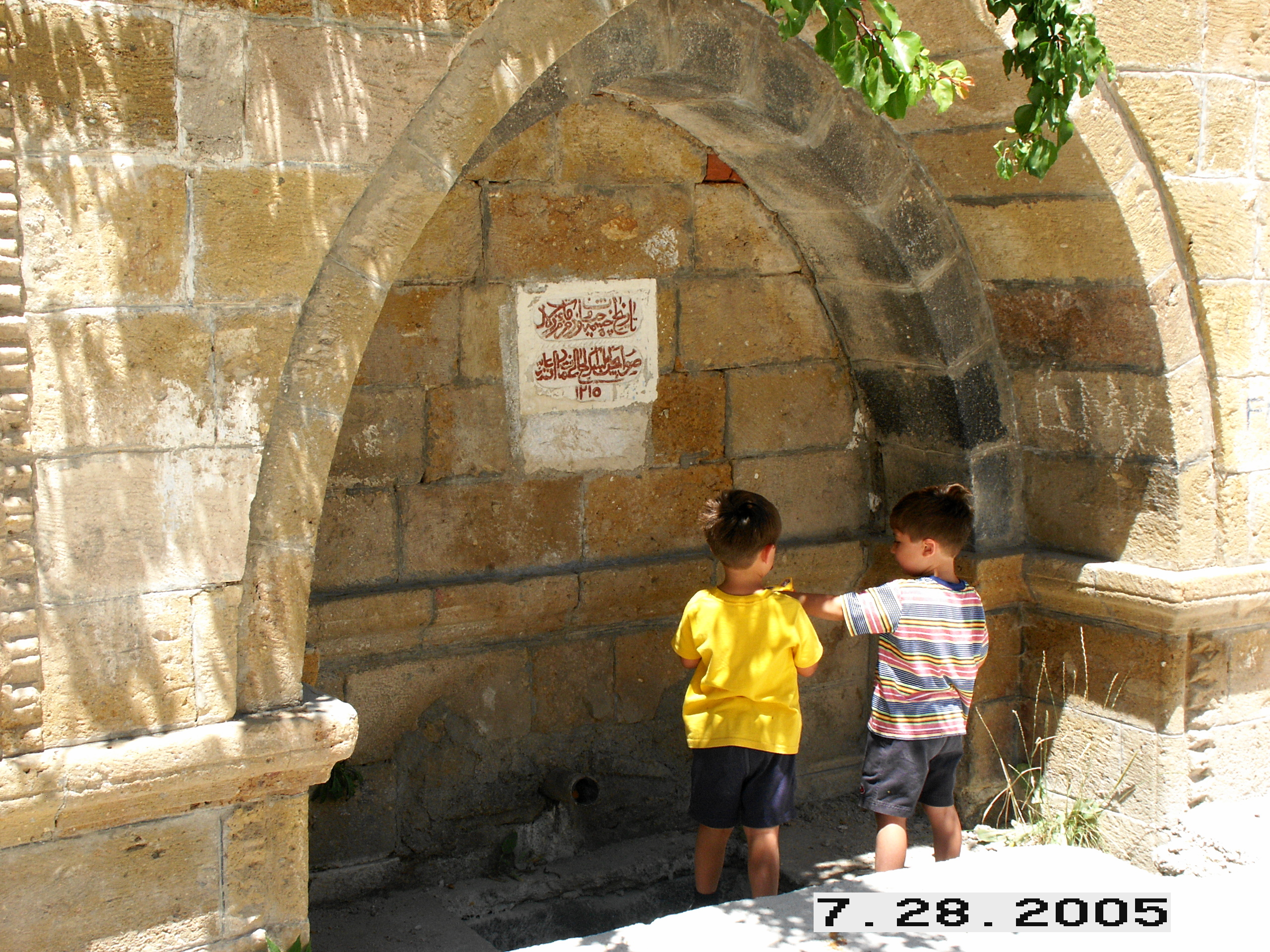

This fountain which has served the locals until quite recently was built in 1800 by Haci Osman Efendi. The fountain is located at Cay Mahallesi (Creek district). The plaque on the fountain displays the following:” life rejuvenating, cold, zamza water fountain, pray for Haci Osman Efendi as you satisfy your thirst; year 1800 AD”. The fountain is built with yellowish, cut-trachyte stones. Within the double arches of the fountain, darker stones were used to create contrast, which avoided in having a monotone structure. The source of its water has never been exactly identified, but it is known that when the creek nearby has water, so does the fountain.

=== Underground city – Mandilmos ===
One of the most important historical places in Fertek, is the "Underground City", as called Mandilmos today. It is estimated to have been built in the second half of the 3rd century. It was built as a sanctuary place to provide protection fort the early Christians, running away from the persecutions of the Roman Empire. At that time, time Romans were trying to stop the spread of Christianity. Mandilmos is very similar to the other underground cities in Cappadocia (Derinkuyu and Yeralti Sehirleri). The entrance to the underground city is through narrow and short path requiring people to bend to go through it. After the entrance, the roads widen as one walks more towards the interior. At the entrance and exit points there are large round stones called "Shaving Stone" or "Keystone" in the form of millstones, which are thought to be used to close and lock the doors to stop the intruders. In the two-storied "Fertek Underground City", there are large rooms, tandoors, ovens, wine houses, earthen jars in the warehouses, small churches (parekklisyon) and grain warehouses called "Hocere". It has a separate ventilation system. The Under Ground City is closed today. Its restoration and opening to the public would make a great contribution to both Fertek and Niğde tourism.

The name Mandilmos, comes from St. Pandeleimon. St. Pandeleimon (Agios Pandeleimon) is one of the healing Christian Saints who was born in Izmit in 271. His father's name is Eustorgios and his mother is Euvuli. After Pandeleimon received his first education, his father sent him to the famous Doctor of the time, Ephrosinos, to get his education in Medicine. During this period, he became one of the best students of Panteleimon Erosinos, who was also the physician of Emperor Maximianus.

The name Pandeleimon evolved into Mandilmos after the exchange of Karamanlides and Turkish population. Mandilmos promenade was the place where the consecration ceremony of the newborn Karamanlides was held at the freshwater spring (agaisma). It is believed that the holy water had healing effects. After the religious ceremony in the church, the congregation would gather behind the priest, sang hymns and go to Mandilmos to observe the baptism ceremony of the newborn children. Then they would return to their homes after receiving their baptismal certificates from the priest.

The construction date of this holy spring is estimated to be in the 18th century. It is a domed structure originally made of cut stone. However, with the repairs made later, it lost its old feature. Today it is used as a promenade.

=== Hamam (bath) ===
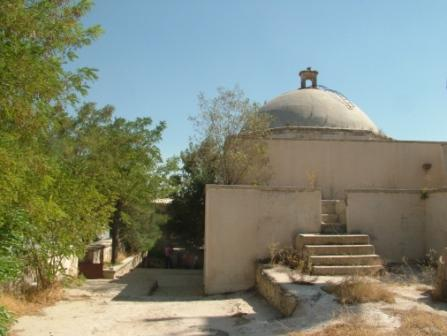
Outside view of hamam (bath)

The historical Hamam (Bath) located at the lower region of Fertek was built by the "Hacı Zambazade" family, one of the Karamanlides families from Karaman, who lived in Fertek during the reign of the Ottoman Sultan Abdülmecid. Its construction started in June 1852 and was completed on March 31, 1853. It is a domed structure made of cut stone and bears the characteristics of Byzantine-Ottoman Architecture. As per the inscription on the stones in the Church, the revenues of this bath were donated to the school operating in the church in Fertek. The Hamam served the Fertek community for many years. A ceremonial part was that the wedding party for the bride would always stop there to pick up the families of the wedding parties as they took their bath before the wedding. Today, the hamam is not being used, and is in need of repairs.

=== Church ===
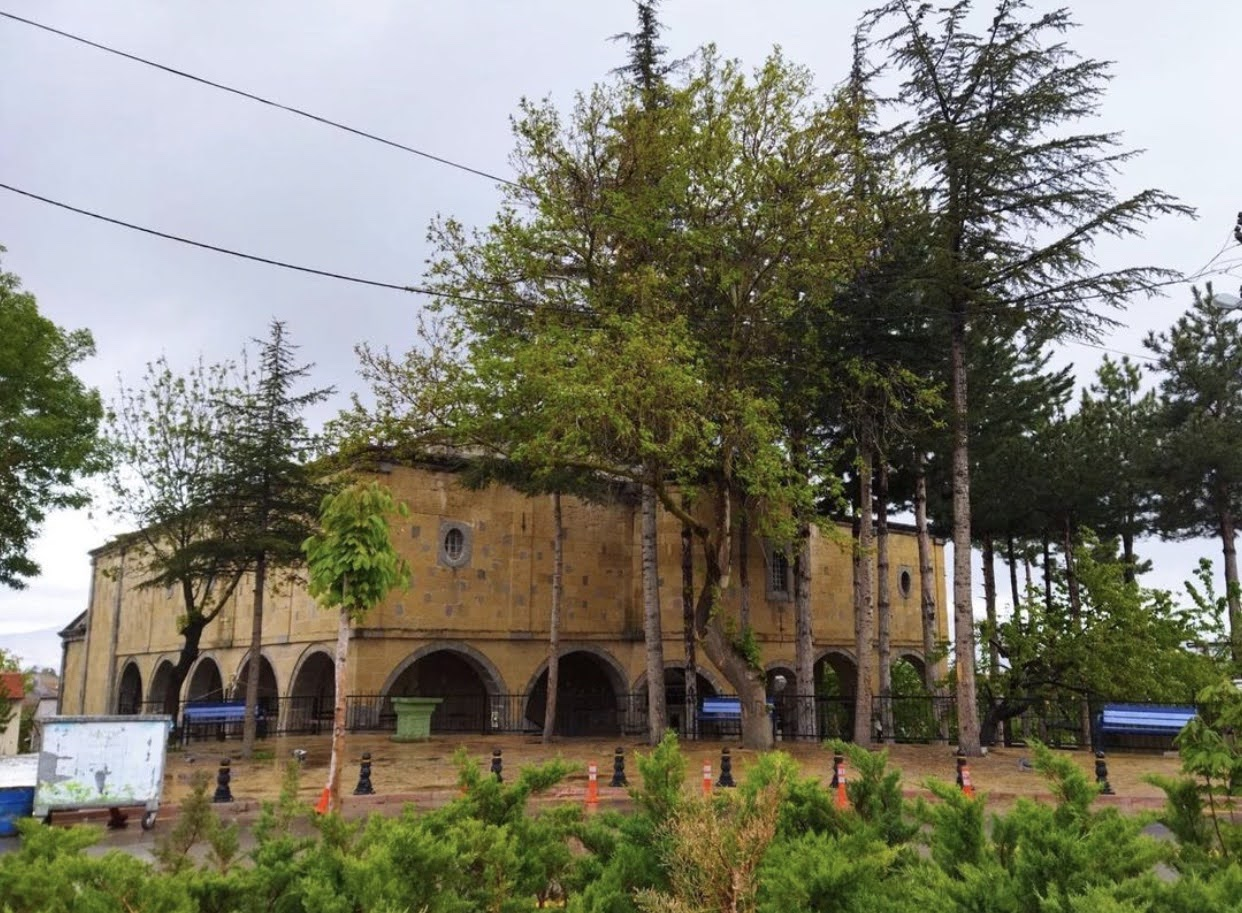
Church of Gabriel and Michael of Angels

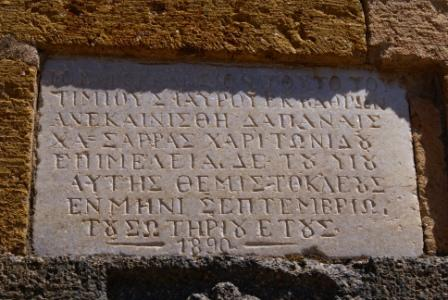
Script on the entrance of the chapel

There are two historical Karamanlides churches in Fertek (some believe there were more). One of these is originally named as the "Church of Gabriel and Michael Angels", which now is being used as a mosque and is named as the New Mosque. It is well maintained and is in very good shape. The other one is known as the chapel, which is next to Enver Arikan's house. Unfortunately, it is not maintained well, and in need of repairs. The Church of Gabriel and Michael of Angels was opened to service on September 29, 1835, by the Karamanlides, Kara Mahooğlu Hacı Nikola, who used to live in Fertek (Archangelos Mihail - Gabriel). A lady named Pipi, wife of Harelem Efendi, used to light the candles of the church every evening. This building, which is a good example of Byzantine - Ottoman Architecture was made of cut stone. The religious frescoes in the three apses of this old church are made by Provos Gambis, from the town of Talas in Kayseri. These frescos are of great importance and, await the attention of scientists, artists, and historians to illuminate the history, art, culture and religion it represents.

=== Ömer Ağa Mosque ===
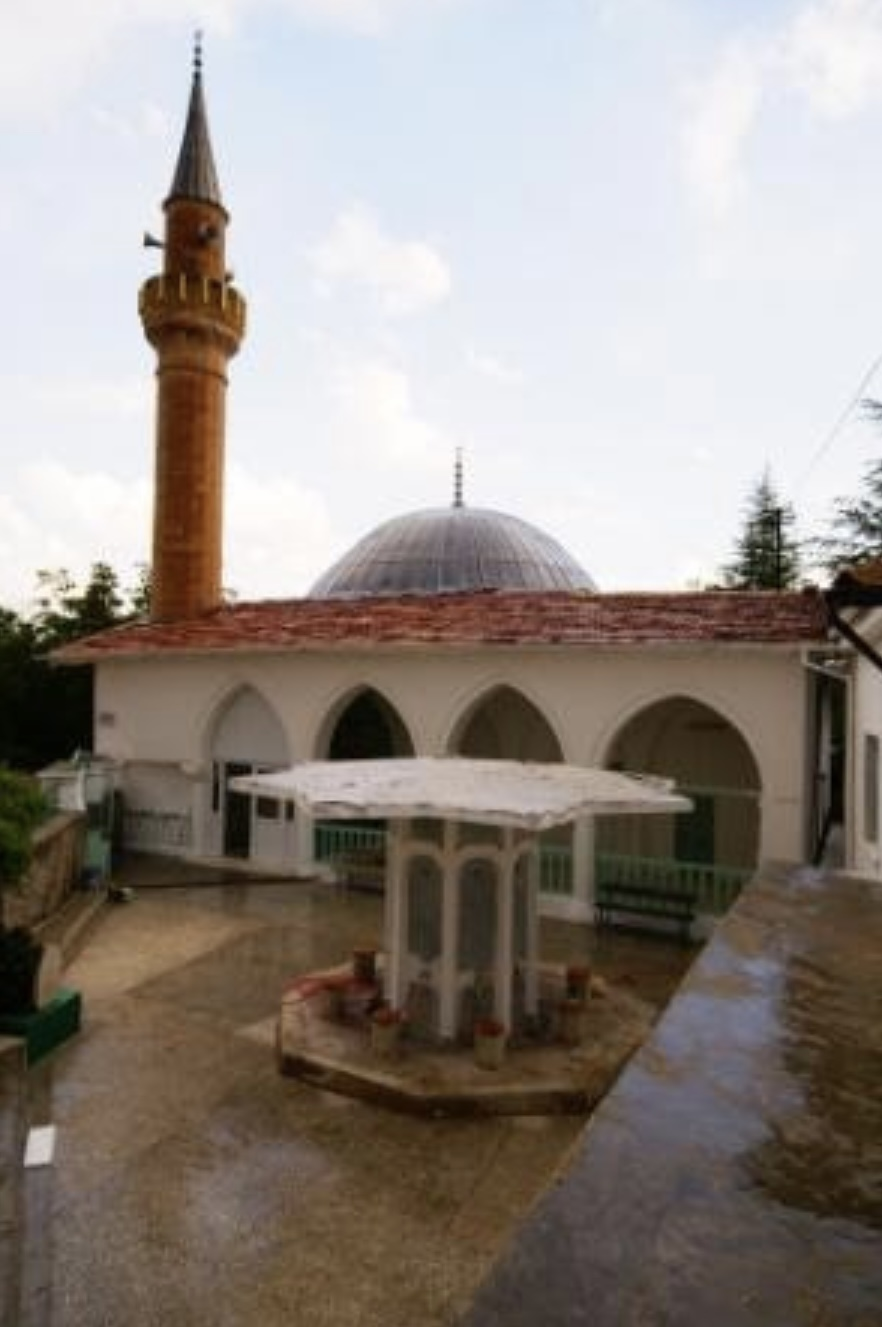
Omer Aga Cami

Another important structure in Fertek is the historical Ömerağa Mosque. The mosque is a domed structure made of cut stone. The script at the entrance door of the mosque indicates that it was built in 1669. The mosque was built by the Foundation established by the mother of the Ottoman Sultan Ahmed III, Gülnuş Sultan, originally named Evmania Voria, who was an ethnic Greek. There were two major repairs were made in the mosque, the first in 1799 and the second in 1958. The mosque is still in service today.

=== School ===
The historical old school in Fertek was built in 1904 with the help of the local merchant, Konstantinos S. Aravanopoulos, and other merchants living in Istanbul, who were originally from Fertek, or had strong connections to Fertek. This school, which survived to the present day went through renovations in the 1940s, and some other minor repairs later. However, it is not in use today and needs repair, awaiting to get the attention of the officials and the funding.

The school has 5 classrooms. At the beginning of the 19th century, about 220 boys and girls were studying at the school. In 1913, it was a secondary school with 60 male and 57 female students. The education program included old and new Greek, French, Turkish, arithmetic, music, history geography and hand-arts. Having its own school was a major asset for Fertek, which was the cornerstone of having an educated population.

== Economy ==
Fertek's economy has been mostly agricultural throughout history. Grapes and apples are the most important products. Before the exchange of Karamanlides and Turkish citizens, the raki manufacturing (spirits) distilled in Fertek were very popular in Istanbul. In modern times, being close to Niğde, city services also play a part of the town economy. At the moment there is no notable touristic revenue, but the touristic potential due to the underground city (which needs restoration) and various buildings including churches allows for the possibility of tourism.

== See also ==
- Geographical name changes in Turkey
- Mehmet I of Karaman
