= Gavros, Kastoria =

Gavros
- Community
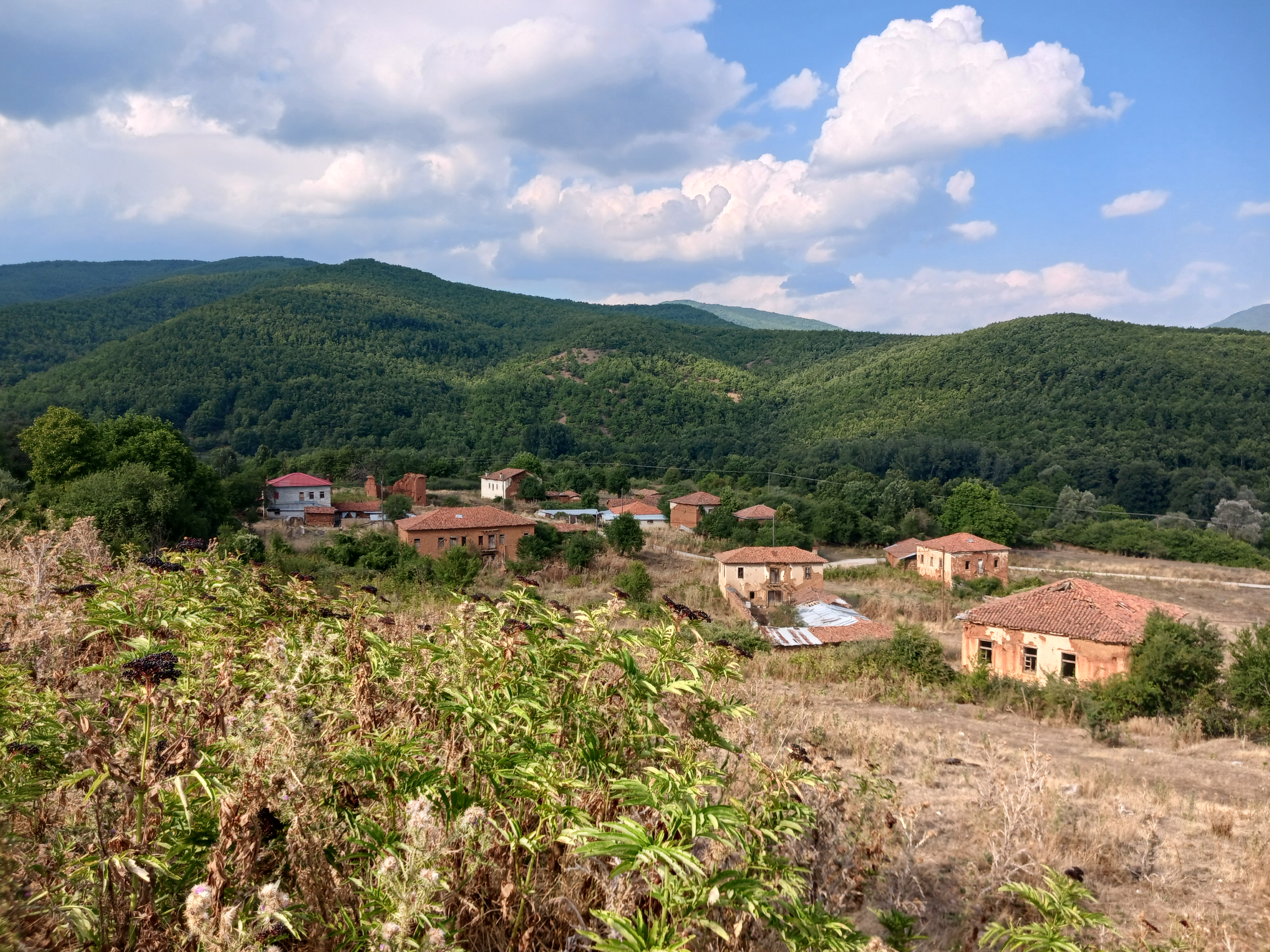
- Gavros

- Location within Greece
- Coordinates: 40°37′37.25″N 21°11′24.51″E
- Country: Greece
- Geographic region: Macedonia
- Administrative region: Western Macedonia
- Regional unit: Kastoria
- Municipality: Kastoria
- Municipal unit: Korestia

Population (2021)
  - Community: 302
- Time zone: UTC+2 (EET)
  - Summer (DST): UTC+3 (EEST)

Gavros (Greek: Γάβρος, before 1926: Γάβρεσι – Gavresi; Bulgarian/Macedonian: Габреш – Gabrеsh/Gabrеš) is a village and a community in Kastoria Regional Unit, Western Macedonia, Greece. The community consists of the villages Gavros and Neos Oikismos.

The village participated in the Ilinden Uprising (1903) and during the conflict it was razed by the Ottoman army. Inhabitants of Gavresi who were master builders and carpenters worked seasonally in the surrounding villages, in Bitola district and the wider region of Western Macedonia, Serbia, Turkey, the Greek islands and Athens. Limited arable land and difficult living conditions of the late Ottoman era and early Greek period made some villagers immigrate to Toronto, Canada. The Gavresi immigrants in Toronto participated in the early Bulgarian community to build church infrastructure.

During the occupation of Greece in the Second World War and in the Greek Civil War the village supported the separatist side and retaliation followed from supporters of the Greek side. In 1945, Greek Foreign Minister Ioannis Politis ordered the compilation of demographic data regarding the Prefecture of Kastoria. The village Gavros had a total of 355 inhabitants, and was populated by 340 Slavophones with a Bulgarian national consciousness. The inhabitants spoke the Dolna Korèshcha variant of the Kostur dialect.
