= Stavropotamos =

- Settlement
- Location within Greece
- Coordinates: 40°32′42.23″N 21°23′33.26″E
- Country: Greece
- Geographic region: Macedonia
- Administrative region: Western Macedonia
- Regional unit: Kastoria
- Municipality: Kastoria
- Municipal unit: Agioi Anargyroi
- Community: Melissotopos

Population (2021)
  - Total: 135
- Time zone: UTC+2 (EET)
  - Summer (DST): UTC+3 (EEST)

Stavropotamos (Greek: Σταυροπόταμος, before 1928: Μπομπότη – Bompoti, between 1928 and 1929: Μακροχώρι – Makrochori) is a village in Kastoria Regional Unit, Macedonia, Greece. It is part of the community of Melissotopos.

In 1945, Greek Foreign Minister Ioannis Politis ordered the compilation of demographic data regarding the Prefecture of Kastoria. The village had a total of 181 inhabitants, populated by 90 Slavophones.
