= Avgi =

Avgi (Αυγή 'dawn') may refer to:

- I Avgi, a Greek newspaper
- Avgi, Kastoria, a village in the Kastoria regional unit, Greece
- Avgi, Kozani, a village in the Kozani regional unit, Greece
- Avgi, Elis, a village in the municipal unit Pineia, Elis, Greece
- Avgi, Thessaloniki, Greece

== See also ==
- Auge, the classical transliteration of the same word
