= Chalara, Kastoria =

Chalara
- Community
- Location within Greece
- Coordinates: 40°38′48″N 21°13′57″E
- Country: Greece
- Geographic region: Macedonia
- Administrative region: Western Macedonia
- Regional unit: Kastoria
- Municipality: Kastoria
- Municipal unit: Korestia

Population (2021)
  - Community: 9
- Time zone: UTC+2 (EET)
  - Summer (DST): UTC+3 (EEST)

Chalara (Greek: Χαλάρα, before 1927: Podovista – Ποδοβίστα) is a village and a community in Kastoria Regional Unit, Macedonia, Greece.

In 1945, Greek Foreign Minister Ioannis Politis ordered the compilation of demographic data regarding the Prefecture of Kastoria. The village Chalara had a total of 723 inhabitants, and was populated by 700 Slavophones with a Bulgarian national consciousness. The inhabitants spoke the Dolna Koreshcha variant of the Kostur dialect
