= Maniakoi =

Maniakoi Μανιάκοι
- Community
- Location within Greece
- Coordinates: 40°30.1′N 21°14.7′E
- Country: Greece
- Geographic region: Macedonia
- Administrative region: Western Macedonia
- Regional unit: Kastoria
- Municipality: Kastoria
- Municipal unit: Agia Triada

Population (2021)
  - Community: 2,612
- Time zone: UTC+2 (EET)
  - Summer (DST): UTC+3 (EEST)

Maniakoi (Greek: Μανιάκοι) is a town in the municipal unit of Agia Triada, Kastoria regional unit, Western Macedonia, Greece. Since the 2010 local government reform, it is part of the municipality Kastoria. It was the seat of the former municipality Agia Triada between 1997 and 2010. In 2021 its population was 2,612. It is situated 3 km (1.9 mi) southwest of the city centre of Kastoria, near A29 motorway.

In 1945, Greek Foreign Minister Ioannis Politis ordered the compilation of demographic data regarding the Prefecture of Kastoria. The village Maniakoi had a total of 156 inhabitants, and was populated by 146 Slavophones with a Bulgarian national consciousness.

== See also ==
- List of settlements in the Kastoria regional unit
