= Regions of Greece (disambiguation) =

Regions of Greece are the 13 current administrative regions of Greece.

Regions of Greece may also refer to:

- The regions of ancient Greece
- The traditional geographic regions of Greece in the modern era
