= Pentavryso, Kastoria =

Village in Macedonia, Greece

Pentavryso
- Community
- Location within Greece
- Coordinates: 40°27′14″N 21°8′32″E
- Country: Greece
- Geographic region: Macedonia
- Administrative region: Western Macedonia
- Regional unit: Kastoria
- Municipality: Kastoria
- Municipal unit: Agia Triada
- Highest elevation: 790 m (2,590 ft)

Population (2021)
  - Community: 566
- Time zone: UTC+2 (EET)
  - Summer (DST): UTC+3 (EEST)

Pentavryso (Greek: Πεντάβρυσο, before 1928: Ζελιγκόσδη – Zeligkosdi) is a village in Kastoria Municipality, in Kastoria regional unit of Macedonia, Greece.

The village centre is on an altitude of 790 m. Pentavryso is sprawling from the northern slopes of a range of green and sandy hills of the Tsemna range (900 m). Kinina hill (902 m), at the forefront of the range stands over Pentavryso and overlooks the Kastoria plain. The village is 15 km SW from Kastoria and approximately 13 km W from Argos Orestiko. To the north and at about 1 km from Pentavryso is the eastward flowing Aliakmon river.l

== Name ==
Linguist Ivan Duridanov states the village's original name comes from the Slavic personal name Zhelegod.

The modern Greek name of the village Pentavryso (Πεντάβρυσο) got its name from the 5 taps in the town, pentavrises a.k.a. pentavryso

== History ==
The discovery of various antiquities testifies to the existence of a settlement during the Roman Empire on the currently flattened hill "Agios Spyridonas", at a distance of only one kilometer from the current village. In Pentavryso, in the summer of 1999, archaeologists discovered the oldest tomb relief of Upper Macedonia and one of the best classical works (in female form) that have ever been discovered in the entire Macedonia.

== Demographics ==
The 1920 Greek census recorded 705 people in the village, and 575 inhabitants (70 families) were Muslim in 1923. Following the Greek–Turkish population exchange, Greek refugee families in Zeligkosdi were from Pontus (103) in 1926. The 1928 Greek census recorded 597 village inhabitants. In 1928, the refugee families numbered 105 (358 people).

== Culture ==
The Association of Friends of the Environment in the village organizes every July events on the mountain Profitis Elias.

From a sports point of view, the local football team is active, playing in the first amateur category for the Kastoria championship.

But the biggest event in the village is the cultural activities of the 15th of August with emphasis on Pontic traditions. These activities are organized every year by the Cultural Association "The Pontos" culminating in a two-day (usually) party attracting people from Greece and abroad that exceeds 5 to 6 thousand participants.

== See also ==
- Orestis (region)
