= Agia Kyriaki, Kastoria =

Village in Western Macedonia, Greece

Agia Kyriaki
- Community
- Location within Greece
- Coordinates: 40°31′30″N 21°7′13″E
- Country: Greece
- Geographic region: Macedonia
- Administrative region: Western Macedonia
- Regional unit: Kastoria
- Municipality: Kastoria
- Municipal unit: Mesopotamia

Population (2021)
  - Community: 205
- Time zone: UTC+2 (EET)
  - Summer (DST): UTC+3 (EEST)

Agia Kyriaki (Greek: Αγία Κυριακή) is a village in Kastoria Regional Unit, Western Macedonia, Greece.

The 1920 Greek census recorded 395 people in the village, and 467 inhabitants (180 families) were Muslim in 1923. Following the Greek–Turkish population exchange, Greek refugee families in Agia Kyriaki were from Pontus (60) in 1926. The 1928 Greek census recorded 264 village inhabitants. In 1928, the refugee families numbered 60 (208 people).
