= Melidoni, Kozani =

Melidoni
- Settlement
- Location within Greece
- Coordinates: 40°20′52″N 21°23′45″E
- Country: Greece
- Geographic region: Macedonia
- Administrative region: Western Macedonia
- Regional unit: Kozani
- Municipality: Voio
- Municipal unit: Neapoli
- Community: Neapoli

Population (2021)
  - Total: 27
- Time zone: UTC+2 (EET)
  - Summer (DST): UTC+3 (EEST)

Melidoni (Greek: Μελιδόνι), is a village in Kozani Regional Unit, Macedonia, Greece. It is part of the community of Neapoli.

The 1920 Greek census recorded 90 people in the village. Following the Greek–Turkish population exchange, Greek refugee families in Melidoni were from Asia Minor (1) in 1926. The 1928 Greek census recorded 121 village inhabitants. In 1928, the refugee families numbered 1 (6 people).
