= Kalochori =

Kalochori (Greek: Καλοχώρι) may refer to the following places in Greece:

- Kalochori, Thessaloniki, a town in the Thessaloniki regional unit
- Kalochori, Kastoria, a village in the Kastoria regional unit
- Kalochori, Ioannina, a village in the Ioannina regional unit
- Kalochori, Larissa, a village in the Larissa regional unit
- Kalochori, Serres, a village in the Serres regional unit
- Kalochori-Panteichi, a village in Euboea regional unit
