= Lithia, Kastoria =

Lithia
- Community

- Location within Greece
- Coordinates: 40°31′15″N 21°24′36″E
- Country: Greece
- Geographic region: Macedonia
- Administrative region: Western Macedonia
- Regional unit: Kastoria
- Municipality: Kastoria
- Municipal unit: Agioi Anargyroi

Population (2021)
  - Community: 263
- Time zone: UTC+2 (EET)
  - Summer (DST): UTC+3 (EEST)

Lithia (Greek: Λιθιά, before 1926: Κομανίτσοβον – Komanitsovon) is a village in Kastoria Regional Unit, Macedonia, Greece.

The 1920 Greek census recorded 755 people in the village, and 260 inhabitants (30 families) were Muslim in 1923. Following the Greek–Turkish population exchange, Greek refugee families in Komanitsovo were from East Thrace (3) and Pontus (20) in 1926. The 1928 Greek census recorded 642 village inhabitants. In 1928, the refugee families numbered 21 (76 people).

In 1945, Greek Foreign Minister Ioannis Politis ordered the compilation of demographic data regarding the Prefecture of Kastoria. The village Lithia had a total of 733 inhabitants, and was populated by 365 Slavophones with a Bulgarian national consciousness. The inhabitants speak the Popole variant of the Kostur dialect.
