= Melissotopos =

- Community
- Location within Greece
- Coordinates: 40°34′41″N 21°23′50″E
- Country: Greece
- Geographic region: Macedonia
- Administrative region: Western Macedonia
- Regional unit: Kastoria
- Municipality: Kastoria
- Municipal unit: Agioi Anargyroi

Population (2021)
  - Community: 286
- Time zone: UTC+2 (EET)
  - Summer (DST): UTC+3 (EEST)

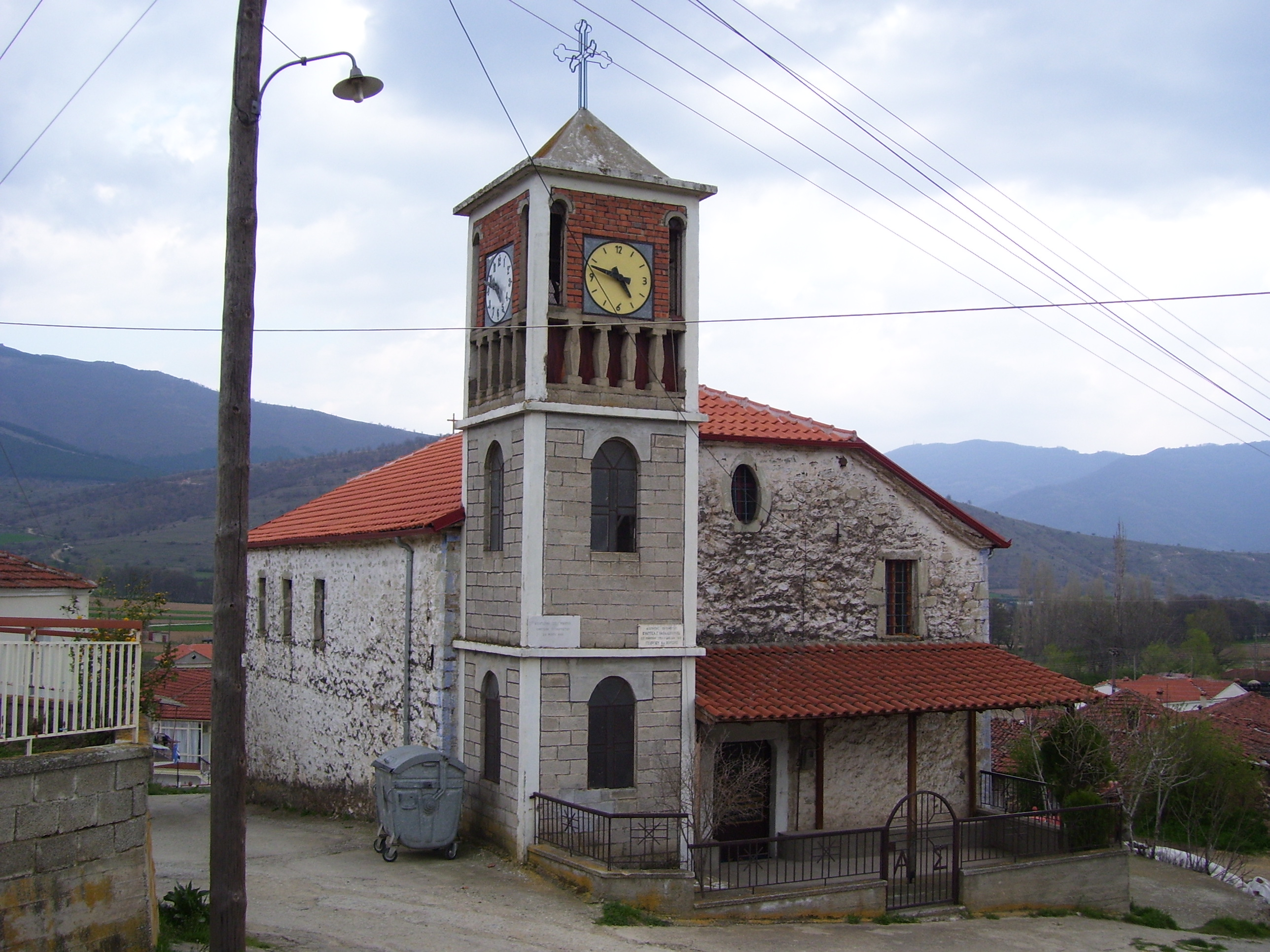

Melissotopos (Greek: Μελισσότοπος, before 1927: Χόλιστα – Cholista) is a village and a community in Kastoria Regional Unit, Macedonia, Greece. The community consists of the villages Melissotopos and Stavropotamos.

In 1945, Greek Foreign Minister Ioannis Politis ordered the compilation of demographic data regarding the Prefecture of Kastoria. The village Melissotopos had a total of 723 inhabitants, and was populated by 700 Slavophones with a Bulgarian national consciousness.
