= Mavrokampos =

- Community
- Location within Greece
- Coordinates: 40°37′41.9″N 21°13′59.2″E
- Country: Greece
- Geographic region: Macedonia
- Administrative region: Western Macedonia
- Regional unit: Kastoria
- Municipality: Kastoria
- Municipal unit: Korestia

Population (2021)
  - Community: 2
- Time zone: UTC+2 (EET)
  - Summer (DST): UTC+3 (EEST)

Mavrokampos (Greek: Μαυρόκαμπος, before 1927: Τσερνολίτσα – Tsernolitsa) is a village and a community in Kastoria Regional Unit, Macedonia, Greece.

In 1945, Greek Foreign Minister Ioannis Politis ordered the compilation of demographic data regarding the Prefecture of Kastoria. The village Mavrokampos had a total of 350 inhabitants, and was populated by 325 Slavophones with a Bulgarian national consciousness. The inhabitants spoke the Dolna Koreshcha variant of the Kostur dialect.
