= Archangelos, Kastoria =

Archangelos
- Settlement
- Location within Greece
- Coordinates: 40°26′45″N 21°3′41″E
- Country: Greece
- Geographic region: Macedonia
- Administrative region: Western Macedonia
- Regional unit: Kastoria
- Municipality: Kastoria
- Municipal unit: Nestorio
- Community: Nestorio
- Time zone: UTC+2 (EET)
  - Summer (DST): UTC+3 (EEST)

Archangelos (Greek: Αρχάγγελος, before 1955: Τσούκα – Tsouka) is an abandoned village in Kastoria Regional Unit, Macedonia, Greece. It is part of the community of Nestorio.

In 1945, Greek Foreign Minister Ioannis Politis ordered the compilation of demographic data regarding the Prefecture of Kastoria. The village Archangelos had a total of 202 inhabitants, and was populated by 180 Slavophones without a Bulgarian national consciousness.
