= Avgi, Kastoria =

Avgi
- Community
- Location within Greece
- Coordinates: 40°25′9″N 21°10′36″E
- Country: Greece
- Geographic region: Macedonia
- Administrative region: Western Macedonia
- Regional unit: Kastoria
- Municipality: Kastoria
- Municipal unit: Agia Triada

Population (2021)
  - Community: 129
- Time zone: UTC+2 (EET)
  - Summer (DST): UTC+3 (EEST)

Avgi (Greek: Αυγή, before 1928: Μπρέστενη – Bresteni, renamed until 1929: Κρύα Νερά – Krya Nera) is a village in Kastoria Regional Unit, Macedonia, Greece.

The 1920 Greek census recorded 312 people in the village, and 200 inhabitants (40 families) were Muslim in 1923. Following the Greek–Turkish population exchange, Greek refugee families in Bresteni were from East Thrace (2), Asia Minor (8), Pontus (5), the Caucasus (22) and one other from an unidentified location in 1926. The 1928 Greek census recorded 265 village inhabitants. In 1928, the refugee families numbered 39 (143 people). After the population exchange, the Pontian refugees who settled in the village demolished its mosque.

In 1945, Greek Foreign Minister Ioannis Politis ordered the compilation of demographic data regarding the Prefecture of Kastoria. The village Avgi had a total of 416 inhabitants, and was populated by 208 Slavophones with 80 percent having a Bulgarian national consciousness.
