= Oinoi, Kastoria =

Oinoi
- Community
- Location within Greece
- Coordinates: 40°31′00″N 21°05′04″E
- Country: Greece
- Geographic region: Macedonia
- Administrative region: Western Macedonia
- Regional unit: Kastoria
- Municipality: Kastoria
- Municipal unit: Mesopotamia

Population (2021)
  - Community: 419
- Time zone: UTC+2 (EET)
  - Summer (DST): UTC+3 (EEST)

Oinoi (Greek: Οινόη, before 1927: Όσιανη – Osiani) is a village in Kastoria Regional Unit, Macedonia, Greece.

The 1920 Greek census recorded 824 people in the village, and 841 inhabitants (145 families) were Muslim in 1923. Following the Greek–Turkish population exchange, Greek refugee families in Osiani were from Pontus (154) in 1926. The 1928 Greek census recorded 602 village inhabitants. In 1928, the refugee families numbered 153 (565 people).
