= Agios Antonios, Kastoria =

Agios Antonios
- Community
- Location within Greece
- Coordinates: 40°38′7″N 21°16′30″E
- Country: Greece
- Geographic region: Macedonia
- Administrative region: Western Macedonia
- Regional unit: Kastoria
- Municipality: Kastoria
- Municipal unit: Korestia

Population (2021)
  - Community: 39
- Time zone: UTC+2 (EET)
  - Summer (DST): UTC+3 (EEST)

Agios Antonios (Greek: Άγιος Αντώνιος, before 1928: Ζέρβαινη – Zervaini; Bulgarian and Macedonian: Жервени, Zherveni or Žerveni) is a village in Kastoria Regional Unit, Macedonia, Greece.

Zervaini (Zhèrveni) was inhabited by Slavic speaking Muslims and its villagers (called Zherventsi) had converted to Islam in 1800. Zervaini villagers spoke the same dialect of the wider Koresta region and only a few men could speak Turkish. After their religious conversion, intermarriage with surrounding Christian villages ceased and their spoken Slavic dialect diverged by keeping some archaic linguistic features lost in other villages and the emergence of new local forms.

The 1920 Greek census recorded 537 people in the village, and 500 inhabitants (55 families) were Muslim in 1923. Following the Greek–Turkish population exchange, the Muslim population of Zervaini entered Turkey through İzmir and Mersin and most resettled in Mustafapaşa with a small number in Cemilköy. Muslim Zervaini people in Turkey had difficulties adjusting to their new environment, due to language differences and unfriendly locals. In early twenty first century Turkey, young people descended from Muslim Zervaini villagers do not speak their Slavic dialect and certain elderly individuals have knowledge of it. Zervaini villagers in Turkey call their language Makedonski (Macedonian).

After the population exchange, Greek refugee families in Zervaini were from Asia Minor (2) and Pontus (48) in 1926. The 1928 Greek census recorded 185 village inhabitants. In 1928, the refugee families numbered 50 (180 people). After the population exchange, the village mosque was destroyed and a church built in its place. In the modern period, the village population is descended from Pontian refugees.
