= A29 motorway (Greece) =

Road in Western Macedonia, Greece

A29 motorway
- Αυτοκινητόδρομος Α29
- Route of the A29 motorway, in green
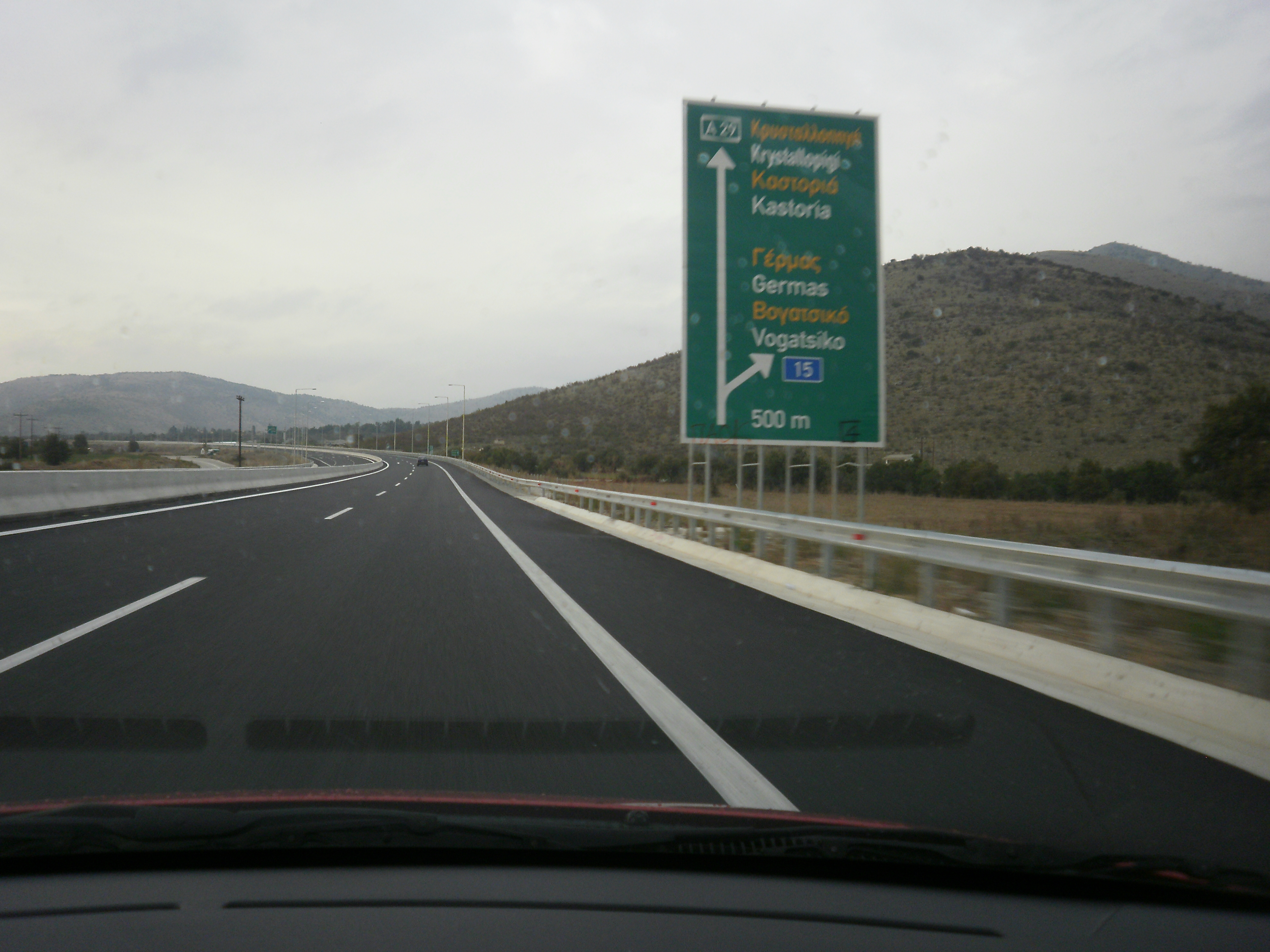
- The A29 near Kastoria

Route information
- Length: 77 km (48 mi)

Major junctions
- South end: Siatista (A2)
- North end: Border with Albania (Krystallopigi)

Location
- Country: Greece
- Regions: Western Macedonia
- Primary destinations: Statista; Kastoria; Koromilia; Ieropigi; Border with Albania (Krystallopigi)

Highway system
- Highways in Greece; Motorways; National roads
← A27	→ A3

The A29 motorway is a branch of the A2 Egnatia Odos motorway in northern Greece, connecting it with the city of Kastoria and the Greek–Albanian border crossing at Krystallopigi. As from July 2017, the motorway is fully operational after the completion of the 15 km part between Koromilia and Krystallopigi at 14/7/17.

== Exit list ==
Regional unit	Exit	Name	Destinations	Notes/Also as
Florina		Krystallopigi border crossing	SH3 E86; Albania	North-western terminus of the A29 motorway
Kastoria
Kastoria		Krystallopigi	EO2 E86 to Florina	
Kastoria		Ieropigi		
Kastoria		Larko		
Kastoria		Koromilea		
Kastoria		Kastoria		
Kastoria		Argos Orestiko - Kastoria National Airport	EO15	
Kastoria		Vogatsiko		
Kozani		Neapoli		
Kozani		Mikrokastro	EO15 EO20	
Kozani		Siatista west	A2 E90 to Ioannina, Thessaloniki	Southern terminus of A29
