= Koromilia, Kastoria =

Koromilia
- Community
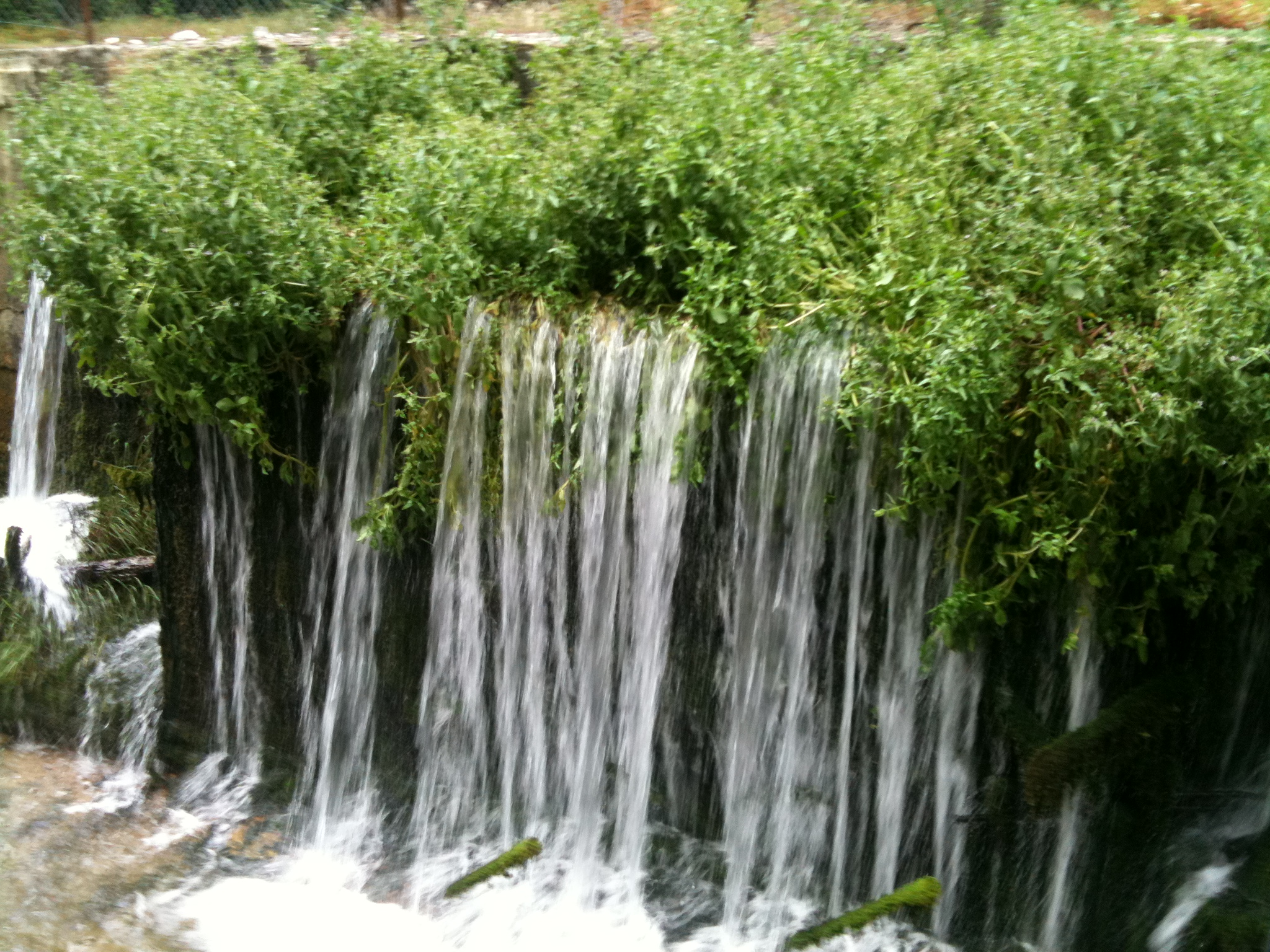
- Ladopotamos river

- Location within Greece
- Coordinates: 40°32′8″N 21°10′56″E
- Country: Greece
- Geographic region: Macedonia
- Administrative region: Western Macedonia
- Regional unit: Kastoria
- Municipality: Kastoria
- Municipal unit: Agia Triada

Population (2021)
  - Community: 308
- Time zone: UTC+2 (EET)
  - Summer (DST): UTC+3 (EEST)

Koromilia (Greek: Κορομηλιά, before 1928: Σλίβενη – Sliveni) is a village in Kastoria Regional Unit, Macedonia, Greece.

It is famous in this region for its natural water springs. In the 19th century, Koromilia had an Albanian Muslim population. It was known as Sliveni among the Bulgarians of the surrounding villages.

The 1920 Greek census recorded 430 people in the village, and 460 inhabitants (60 families) were Muslim in 1923. Following the Greek–Turkish population exchange, Greek refugee families in Sliveni were from East Thrace (2), Asia Minor (5) and Pontus (74) in 1926. The 1928 Greek census recorded 315 inhabitants. In 1928, the refugee families numbered 80 (337 people).
