= Mitreski =

Mitreski (Macedonian: Митрески) is a Macedonian surname. Notable people with the surname include:

- Aleksandar Mitreski (born 1980), Macedonian footballer
- Igor Mitreski (born 1979), Macedonian footballer

== See also ==
- Mitrevski, surname
