= Kalochori, Kastoria =

Kalochori
- Community
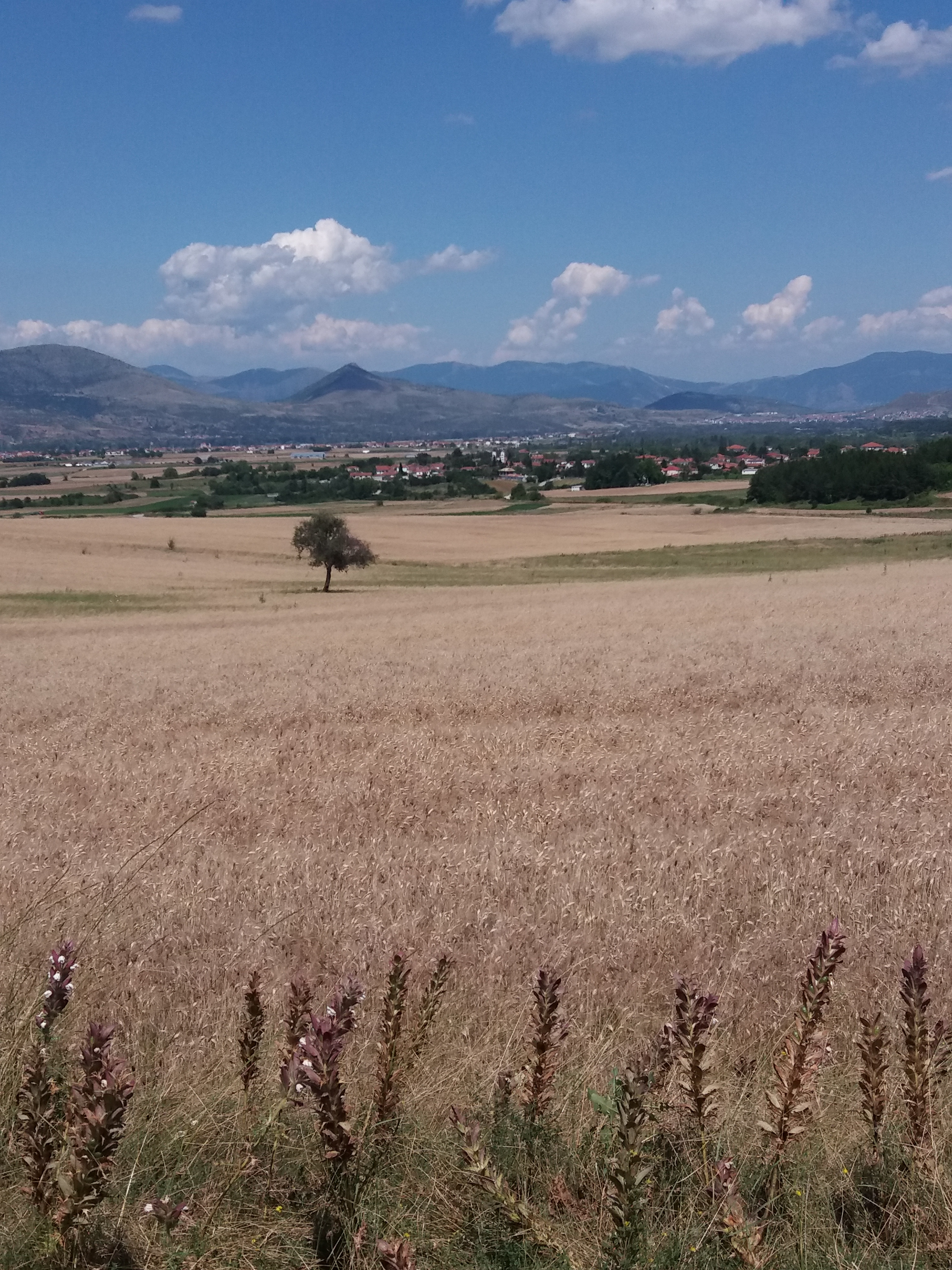
- Kalochori from a distance

- Location within Greece
- Coordinates: 40°29′9″N 21°8′1″E
- Country: Greece
- Geographic region: Macedonia
- Administrative region: Western Macedonia
- Regional unit: Kastoria
- Municipality: Kastoria
- Municipal unit: Kastoria

Population (2021)
  - Community: 329
- Time zone: UTC+2 (EET)
  - Summer (DST): UTC+3 (EEST)

Kalochori (Greek: Καλοχώρι, before 1926: Δοβρόλιτσα – Dovrolitsa; Macedonian: Добролишта Dobrolišta; Bulgarian: Добролища Dobrolishta, Добролишча Dobrolishcha in the Kostur dialect), is a small rural village, part of the municipal unit of Kastoria, Kastoria regional unit, Greece. Kalochori is also located 14 kilometers away from the city of Kastoria and 14 kilometers away from the village of Nestorio. It was a part of the former municipal unit of Mesopotamia. The village has an elevation of 721 meters above sea level.

== History ==
=== Ottoman Empire ===
According to Academician Ivan Duridanov, the etymology of the name is from the original patronymic of ishti, which comes from the personal name Dobrol

In the fifteenth century, the village had 140 names of households that were named.

Families from Dobrolishta, along with Slimnitsa and Omotsko, settled in 1791 and in the Nevrokop village of Kovachevitsa, where they formed the so-called Arnautska neighborhood. They are engaged in construction and founded the Kovachevitsa architectural-building school.

In the beginning of the 20th century, the entire Christian population of Dobrolishta was under the influence of the Patriarchate of Constantinople, but after the Ilinden uprising in the beginning of 1904 it was under the influence of the Bulgarian Exarchate.

The same year, Ottoman authorities did not allow teacher A. Naumov from Aposkep to open a Bulgarian school in the village.

In October 1906, Ottoman forces succeeded in killing the voivode Nikola Dobrolitski and two of his chetniks in Dobrolishta

Also in 1906, Dobrolista was attacked by Greek forces led by Nikolaos Platanias (Lahtaras).

An Ottoman built structure found in the village.

=== Greece ===
At the outbreak of the Balkan Wars in 1912, two people from Dobrolishta were volunteers in the Macedonian-Adrianople Corps.

During the Balkan Wars, the village was occupied by Greek troops and remained in Greece after the Balkan Wars.

Borivoje Milojevic, a Serbian geographer, wrote in his book Južna Makedonija (1921) that Dobrolishta had 30 Slavic Christian houses and 40 Turkish houses.

The 1920 Greek census recorded 434 people in the village, and 198 inhabitants (140 families) were Muslim in 1923. Following the Greek–Turkish population exchange, Greek refugee families in Dovrolitsa were from Pontus (39) in 1926. The 1928 Greek census recorded 455 village inhabitants. In 1928, the refugee families numbered 40 (139 people).

In 1926, Dobrolishta is changed to Kalohorion which translates to good village.

During the Second World War, Kalochori was in the Italian occupation zone. The village suffered from the Italian detachments.

In 1945, Greek Foreign Minister Ioannis Politis ordered the compilation of demographic data regarding the Prefecture of Kastoria. The village Kalochori had a total of 620 inhabitants, and was populated by 310 Slavophones without a Bulgarian national consciousness.

On 4 May 1945, Kalochori was pillaged by the Greek detachment of Andonios Amanatidis, many women and men are abused. 13 children from Kalochori, are moved out of the country by the communist authorities as refugees to the Eastern Bloc during the Greek Civil War. There are nine political killings in the village during the Greek Civil War.

The village of Tsartsista was eventually abandoned around the 1970s and its inhabitants were relocated to Kalochori.

Kalochori typically produces tobacco, wheat, and lentils in its surrounding fields.

=== Censuses ===
- 1913 – 468 people
- 1920 – 434 people
- 1928 – 455 people
- 1940 – 634 people
- 1951 – 585 people
- 1961 – 520 people
- 1971 – 458 people
- 1981 – 475 people
- 1991 – 459 people
- 2001– 458 people
- 2011 – 398 people
