= Avgi, Kozani =

Avgi Αυγή
- Community
- Location within Greece
- Coordinates: 40°21′N 22°02′E
- Country: Greece
- Administrative region: Western Macedonia
- Regional unit: Kozani
- Municipality: Kozani
- Municipal unit: Ellispontos

Population (2021)
  - Community: 17
- Time zone: UTC+2 (EET)
  - Summer (DST): UTC+3 (EEST)

Avgi is a village in the Ellispontos municipal unit, Kozani regional unit, Greece.
