= Evangelos Kofos =

Greek historian and writer (1934–2022)

Evangelos Kofos (Greek: Ευάγγελος Κωφός; 1934 – 25 April 2022) was a Greek historian and writer.

== Life and career ==
Kofos was born in Edessa, Macedonia, Greece in 1934. He graduated from Anatolia College of Thessaloniki in 1952. His grandfather, Evangelos Ant. Kofou, had been an elected elder of the Greek Community Council in the then Ottoman-held Edessa, responsible for the Greek schools of the region. A generation later, his father, Andonis Ev. Kofou, had been organized in the Resistance in Edessa during the German occupation, until his arrest and imprisonment in 1943 in a notorious prison camp in Thessaloniki. As a result, the family moved to the mother’s (Anna Avaropoulou Kofou) native town, Thessaloniki.

Kofos was a special adviser on Balkan affairs at the Hellenic Foundation for European and Foreign Policy, Athens, Greece.

In 1995 he was appointed visiting fellow on Greek studies at Brasenose College, Oxford. Prior to this he had served for over thirty years at the Greek Ministry of Foreign Affairs as Special Consultant on Balkan Affairs and retired with the rank of ambassador-counselor.

He held a Ph.D. in history from Birkbeck College, University of London (1993), a M.A. in international relations from Georgetown University, Washington D.C. (1959), and a B.Sc. in journalism from Ohio University, Athens, Ohio (1955). Kofos was a member of several academic societies and served for many years as special counsellor on Balkan affairs in the Ministry of Foreign Affairs in Athens. He is also the author of a number of books and essays on Greek and Balkan issues. Two of his books, Greece and the Eastern Crisis, 1875-1878, (Thessaloniki 1975 in English. Athens, 2001 in Greek) and The History of the Macedonian Question in the 19th and 20th centuries \[in Greek, 1993, unpublished\],) have received Academy of Athens awards. His earlier book, Nationalism and Communism in Macedonia, (Thessaloniki, 1964, reissued with additional essays, New York, 1993) has been considered a pioneering work on a controversial Balkan issue.

In later years he was engaged with projects dealing with the Kosovo and Macedonian issues. In 1998, he co-edited with Thanos Veremis the book Kosovo, Avoiding Another Balkan War (Athens, ELIAMEP) and subsequently he published his own book Kosovo and the Albanian Unification; The Burden of the Past, the Anguish of the Future (Athens, 1998, in Greek). In 2005, he co-edited with Vlasis Vlasidis the book, Athens-Skopje: An Uneasy Symbiosis, 1995-2002 (Athens, ELIAMEP, in English) and in 2008 he co-edited with Ioannis Stefanidis and Vlasis Vlasidis a new volume, Makedonikes Taftotites sto Chrono. Diepistimonikes Prosengisies ("Macedonian Identities in Times. Interdisciplinary Approaches"), Thessaloniki, Athens, Patakis publishers, 2008.

In 1999 the President of the Hellenic Republic Constantine Stephanopoulos decorated him with the Golden Cross of the Order of Phoenix for his services and all round meritorious work,. Ten years later, in 2010, the Academy of Athens bestowed on him its Award for the entirety of his scholarly work.

Kofos died on 25 April 2022, at the age of 88.
