= Tanja Mitrevska =

Macedonian footballer

Personal information
- Date of birth: 27 February 1987 (age 39)
- Position: Defender

International career^{‡}
Years	Team	Apps	(Gls)
2009–2014	North Macedonia	22	(0)
- ‡ National team caps and goals as of 11:52, 19 September 2021 (UTC)

Tanja Mitrevska (born 27 February 1987) is a Macedonian footballer who plays as a defender for the North Macedonia national team.

== International career ==
Mitrevska made her debut for the North Macedonia national team on 19 September 2009, against Slovakia.
