= Korestia =

Korestia Κορέστια
- Municipal unit
- Location within the regional unit

- Location within Greece
- Coordinates: 40°40′N 21°16′E
- Country: Greece
- Geographic region: Macedonia
- Administrative region: Western Macedonia
- Regional unit: Kastoria
- Municipality: Kastoria

Area
  - Municipal unit: 122.3 km^{2} (47.2 sq mi)

Population (2021)
  - Municipal unit: 553
  - Municipal unit density: 4.52/km^{2} (11.7/sq mi)
- Time zone: UTC+2 (EET)
  - Summer (DST): UTC+3 (EEST)
- Vehicle registration: KT

Korestia (Greek: Κορέστια) is a municipal unit of Kastoria municipality in Kastoria regional unit, Western Macedonia, Greece. The municipal unit has an area of 122.281 km^{2}. Population 553 (2021). The seat of the former municipality was in Makrochori.
