= Agia Triada, Kastoria =

Place in Western Macedonia, Greece

Agia Triada Αγία Τριάδα
- Municipal unit
- Location within the regional unit

- Location within Greece
- Coordinates: 40°30′N 21°14′E
- Country: Greece
- Administrative region: West Macedonia
- Regional unit: Kastoria
- Municipality: Kastoria

Area
  - Municipal unit: 99.1 km^{2} (38.3 sq mi)
- Elevation: 696 m (2,283 ft)

Population (2021)
  - Municipal unit: 5,676
  - Municipal unit density: 57.3/km^{2} (148/sq mi)
- Time zone: UTC+2 (EET)
  - Summer (DST): UTC+3 (EEST)
- Vehicle registration: KT

Agia Triada (Greek: Αγία Τριάδα) is a former municipality in Kastoria regional unit, Western Macedonia, Greece. Since the 2011 local government reform it is part of the municipality Kastoria, of which it is a municipal unit. The municipal unit has an area of 99.092 km^{2}. Population 5,676 (2021). The seat of the municipality was in Maniakoi.
