= Kastoria (regional unit) =

Kastoria Περιφερειακή ενότητα Καστοριάς
- Regional unit
- Municipalities of Kastoria

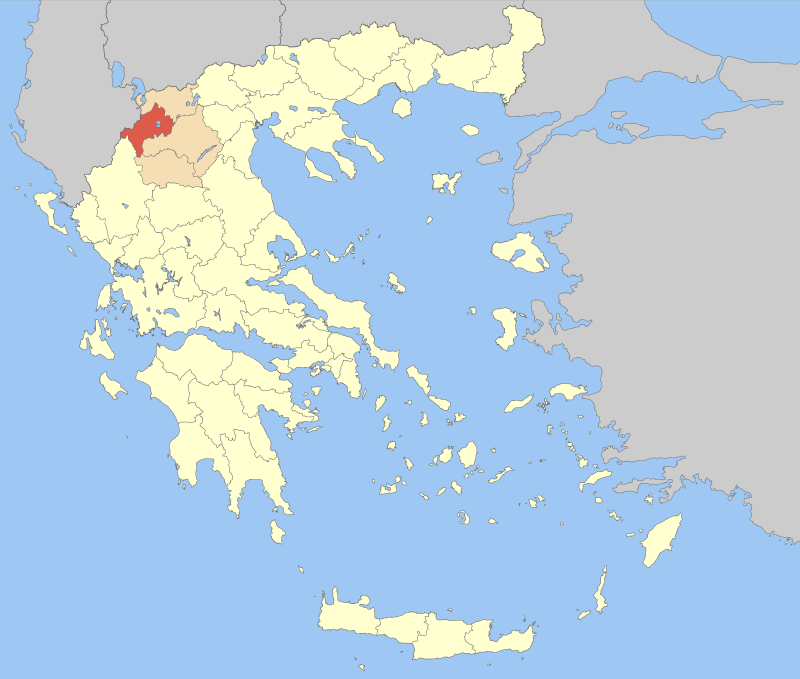
- Kastoria within Greece

- Location within Greece
- Coordinates: 40°30′N 21°15′E
- Country: Greece
- Geographic region: Macedonia
- Administrative region: Western Macedonia
- Seat: Kastoria

Area
  - Total: 1,720 km^{2} (660 sq mi)

Population (2021)
  - Total: 45,929
  - Density: 26.7/km^{2} (69.2/sq mi)
- Time zone: UTC+2 (EET)
  - Summer (DST): UTC+3 (EEST)
- Postal code: 52x xx
- Area code: 24670
- Vehicle registration: ΚΑ
- Website: www.kastoria.gr

Kastoria (Greek: Περιφερειακή Ενότητα Καστοριάς, Perifereiakí Enótita Kastoriás) is one of the 74 regional units of Greece and is part of the region of Western Macedonia. Its capital is the homonymous city of Kastoria.

== Geography ==
Kastoria is situated at the western end of Macedonia in the far north of the country. It borders the regional units of Florina to the north, Kozani to the southeast, Grevena to the south and Ioannina to the southwest. The area of the regional unit roughly corresponds to the ancient Greek region of Orestis of Upper Macedonia. The international border with the Albanian district of Korçë lies on the western edge of the regional unit.

The main mountain ranges are Gramos and Voio in the west (both part of the Pindus range) and Verno in the northeast. The Haliacmon river flows through the area. Lake Orestiada is the largest lake. The regional unit is mountainous with a pronounced continental climate, characterised by cold winters and hot summers.

== Administration ==
The regional unit Kastoria is subdivided into 3 municipalities. These are (number as in the map in the infobox):

- Kastoria (1)
- Nestorio (2)
- Argos Orestiko (3)

=== Prefecture ===
Kastoria was created as a prefecture (Greek: Νομός Καστοριάς) in 1941. As a part of the 2011 Kallikratis government reform, the regional unit Kastoria was created out of the former prefecture Kastoria. The prefecture had the same territory as the present regional unit. At the same time, the municipalities were reorganised, according to the table below.

New municipality	Old municipalities	Seat
Kastoria	Kastoria	Kastoria
Kastoria	Agia Triada	Kastoria
Kastoria	Agioi Anargyroi	Kastoria
Kastoria	Vitsi	Kastoria
Kastoria	Kastraki	Kastoria
Kastoria	Kleisoura	Kastoria
Kastoria	Korestia	Kastoria
Kastoria	Makednoi	Kastoria
Kastoria	Mesopotamia	Kastoria
Nestorio	Nestorio	Nestorio
Nestorio	Akrites	Nestorio
Nestorio	Arrenes	Nestorio
Nestorio	Gramos	Nestorio
Argos Orestiko	Argos Orestiko	Argos Orestiko
Argos Orestiko	Ion Dragoumis	Argos Orestiko

== Demographics ==
The Kastoria region was part of the Ottoman Empire for several centuries and following the Balkan Wars (1912–1913) became part of Greece. There were religious communities such as Christians, Muslims and Jews and groups of Turcophones, Greeks, Aromanians and Slavophones. The rural areas of Kastoria province were multi–ethnic, as the north was largely, though not entirely populated by Slavic speakers, while the south mainly had Grecophones. The demographics of the Kastoria region were affected by the population exchanges Greece had with Bulgaria (voluntary, 1919) and Turkey (compulsory, 1923). Numbers of Slavic speakers decreased. After 1913, a few Christian families from the new state of Albania settled in several villages within Kastoria district.

The official and unpublished Greek census (1923) recorded 68,245 people in Kastoria district, with 29,598 Slav Macedonian Christians and 22,768 Greeks who also included Aromanian speakers and Albanian speakers. Muslims numbered either 13,767 people (or 2425 families) or 14,448 inhabitants and 1,794 Jews. Historian John Koliopoulos described the 1923 census as "the least unreliable" for its numbers of language groups in the area. A quarter of all inhabitants in the Kastoria region were Muslims and they, including Muslim Albanophones were sent to Turkey as part of the Greek–Turkish population exchange based on religious criteria. A small number of Muslim Albanians were excluded from the population exchange and remained in the Kastoria region.

In 1924, Greek authorities compiled data of the ethnological composition of Greek Macedonia. Kastoria district had a total of 68,340 inhabitants composed of 22,768 Greeks; 14,448 Muslims; 7,519 Slavophone former Patriarchists; 22,079 Slavophone former Exarchists; 220 Aromanian speakers (pro–Romanian); 1,211 Jews and 95 refugees. Political categories from a nationalist perspective were used to describe ethnic groups or religious affiliations in the 1924 data by Greek authorities.

Greek refugees arrived in the Kastoria area, while their settlement was limited by the lack of fertile land and the need for stable bilateral relations with Yugoslavia which also prevented mass Slavophone emigration. In Greek Macedonia, Kastoria province remained an area in the interwar period where Slavophones were a large part of the population. A 1925 study by the Greek 10th Army Division of Western Macedonia recorded 1,866 refugee families were settled in 28 villages within the Kastoria region. Greek refugee families in Kastoria prefecture were from East Thrace (41), Asia Minor (441), Pontus (1,417), the Caucasus (23) and unidentified locations (9) in 1926. In 1928, there were 1,928 refugee families (7,554 people). In the Kastoria region, the number of refugees reached 8,370.

The official and unpublished Greek census (1925) for the Kastoria district recorded 17,737 native Greeks and 5,962 Greek refugees; 14,807 Slavophone former Exarchists; 7,339 Slavophone former Patriarchists; 2,195 Aromanian speakers (pro–Greek), 135 Aromanian speakers (pro–Romanian); 525 Jews, 213 Muslim Albanians and 29 foreigners. A report (January 1925) by the Florina prefect stated the total Kastoria district population was 47,500. Slavophones (29,500) were the majority population and divided between Exarchists or "Schismatics" (22,000) who supported Bulgaria and Patriarchists (7,500) who supported Greece. Native Greeks numbered 10,500 and refugees were 7,500.

A refugee committee report (1942) from Bulgarian occupied northern Greece using League of Nations data covering 1913 to 1928 stated the numbers of Slav Macedonian emigrants from Kastoria district to Bulgaria were 4,070. Koliopoulos commented 4,200 emigrants was a figure reflecting nearer the realities of the period. The 1942 report wrote the combined number of Slav Macedonians of the interwar period in Kastoria and Florina districts was 37,000. Another estimate on the interwar period put the number of Slav Macedonians in Kastoria district at 12,000.

A report in 1930 by Florina prefect P. Kalligas recorded the combined population of the Florina/Kastoria region as 125,722 and 58,882 had Greek sentiments and 61,950 were without a Greek national consciousness. Language groups: 76,370 Slavophones; 38,844 Grecophones (natives and refugees); 3,508 Turcophones (refugees); 4,500 Aromanians and 2,500 Albanians. Greek sentiments among language groups: 14,420 Slavophones; 38,854 Grecophones (natives and refugees); 3,508 Turcophones (refugees); 3,000 Aromanians and 1,800 Albanians.

In 1940, Kastoria district had a population of 68,237. The Greek ministers for Military Affairs, Justice and the Interior ordered a census (1945) of citizens with "Bulgarian sentiments" who numbered 11,380 in Kastoria Prefecture. Greek Foreign Minister Ioannis Politis ordered the compilation of demographic data by a committee from the Greek political establishment regarding the Prefecture of Kastoria in 1945. The total prefecture population was 58,590, and Slavophones numbered 21,867 with 13,517 having a Bulgarian national consciousness. Colonel Anastasios Dalipis in 1945 stated Kastoria prefecture had a total of 110 villages with 75 populated by Slavophones.

During 1951, the Greek census recorded 1,009 Slavophones in Kastoria district. The Greek National Intelligence Service conducted a secret census in 1954 and Slavophones in Kastoria district numbered 17,229. Information supplied to diplomat Dimitrios Bitsios and academic Evangelos Kofos by local representatives in 1965 estimated Slavophones in Kastoria district numbered 40,000.

In the 1990s, the European Commission's Euromosaic project documenting minority languages recorded 77 (Slavo) Macedonian/Bulgarian villages in the Prefecture of Kastoria, and a presence in Kastoria and Argos Orestiko. Slavophones were concentrated in certain areas within the prefecture and a significant small part of the population had knowledge of and used the Macedonian language, being aware of its cultural value. A survey (1999–2005) conducted by linguist Christian Voss of Slavic speaking villages in Greece, counted 117 villages in the administrative region of Western Macedonia which included the prefecture of Kastoria.

== Transport ==
The main roads that pass through the regional unit are the A29 motorway and EO15 road. The EO20 briefly passes through the unit to the south, through Eptachori.

== See also ==
- List of settlements in the Kastoria regional unit
- Dispilio Tablet
