= Traditional regions of Greece =

Overview of Greek geographical regions

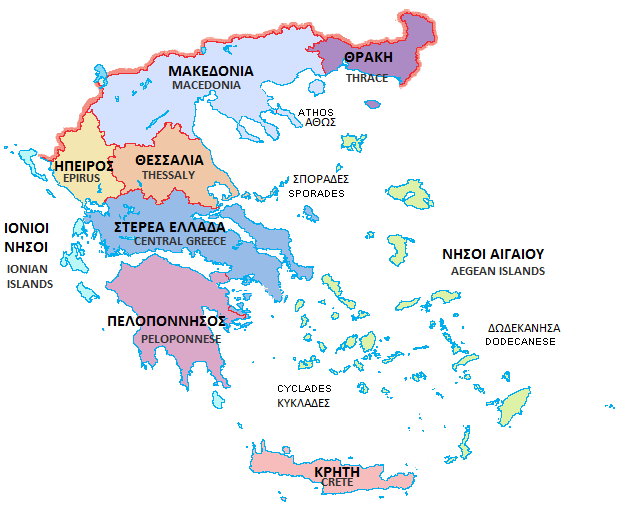
Map showing Regions of Greece

The traditional geographic regions of Greece (Greek: γεωγραφικά διαμερίσματα, lit. 'geographic departments') are the country's main historical-geographic regions, and were also official administrative regional subdivisions of Greece until the 1987 administrative reform. Despite their replacement as first-level administrative units by only partly identical administrative regions (Greek: περιφέρειες), the nine traditional geographic regions—six on the mainland and three island groups—are still widely referred to in unofficial contexts and in daily discourse.

As of 2011, the official administrative divisions of Greece consist of 13 regions (Greek: περιφέρειες)—nine on the mainland and four island groups—which are further subdivided into 74 regional units and 325 municipalities. Formerly, there were also 54 prefectures or prefectural-level administrations.

The largest of the geographical regions in size is Macedonia and the largest in population is Central Greece. The Ionian Islands are the smallest in both size and population.

Geographic region	Land area (% of total)	Population 2021 (% of total)	Largest city	Post-1987 administrative region(s)
Aegean Islands	9,165 km² (6.9%)	522,763 (5.0%)	Rhodes	split into North Aegean, South Aegean
Central Greece	24,107 km² (18.3%)	4,495,920 (42.9%)	Athens	split into Attica, Central Greece, part of Western Greece
Crete	8,341 km² (6.3%)	624,408 (6.0%)	Heraklion	identical
Epirus	9,160 km² (6.9%)	319,991 (3.1%)	Ioannina	identical
Ionian Islands	2,604 km² (2.0%)	208,176 (2.0%)	Corfu	identical, apart from Kythira, which became part of Attica
Macedonia (Note: In Macedonia there is one autonomous region, Mount Athos (Ayion Oros, or "Holy Mountain"), a monastic state under Greek sovereignty. It is located on the easternmost of the three large peninsulas jutting into the Aegean from the Macedonian mainland.)	34,213 km² (25.9%)	2,266,206 (21.6%)	Thessaloniki	split into Western Macedonia, Central Macedonia, part of East Macedonia and Thrace
Peloponnese	21,782 km² (16.5%)	1,010,509 (9.6%)	Patras	split into Peloponnese, part of Western Greece
Thessaly	14,051 km² (10.6%)	688,255 (6.6%)	Larissa	identical
Thrace	8,594 km² (6.5%)	346,259 (3.3%)	Alexandroupolis	merged into East Macedonia and Thrace

== See also ==
- Regions of ancient Greece
