= Maslina Grancharova =

Bulgarian teacher and revolutionary (1874–1958)

Maslina Grancharova>
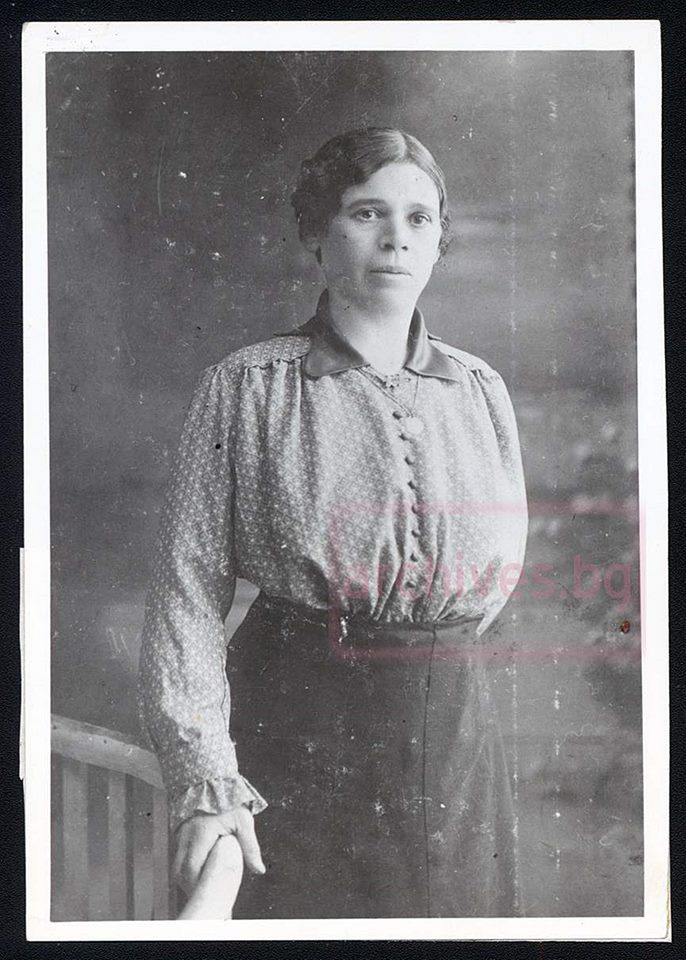
- Born: 1874; Zagorichani (today Vasiliada), Kastoria, Ottoman Empire
- Died: 1958 (aged 83–84)
- Occupations: teacher and revolutionary

Maslina Ivanova Grancharova (Bulgarian: Маслина Иванова Грънчарова; 1874–1958), also known as the Rayna Knyaginya of Kastoria (Bulgarian: Костурската Райна Княгиня), was a Bulgarian teacher and revolutionary from the village of Zagorichani (Bulgarian: Загоричани, present day Vassiliada), Manastir Vilayet, Ottoman Empire. She was a member of the Internal Macedonian Revolutionary Organization (IMRO) and participated in the Macedonian Struggle, most notably in the Ilinden Uprising. She sewed the flag that represented the liberation of Dumbeni (today Dendrochori), Kastoria from the Ottomans and was the flag-bearer for her unit during the Ilinden Uprising.

== Biography ==
Grancharova was born in 1874 in the small village of Zagorichani (today Vasiliada) in Kastoria during Ottoman rule. Her father's name was Ivan, and she had a brother named Vangel. She graduated from a Bulgarian high school for girls in Thessaloniki and began teaching in Didymoteicho. After joining IMRO in 1895, she moved to Surovichevo (today Amyntaio) and Zeleniche (today Sklithro) and performed courier duties for the organization in addition to continuing teaching. She and a fellow teacher, Elena Minasova, sewed and bore the flag representing the movement to liberate Dumbeni. In 1901, she briefly returned to her hometown of Zagorichani, where she met famous IMRO leader Gotse Delchev.

Grancharova was arrested by Turkish authorities and imprisoned in Korçë (today in Albania) along with fellow revolutionaries Manol Rizov, Lazar Poptrajkov, and Pavel Christov. After her release, she became secretary of the Central Committee and member of the Kastoria Regional Committee of IMRO. In these high-seated positions, she assisted in the planning of the Ilinden Uprising.

On 2 August 1903, at the start of the uprising, Grancharova rode on horseback, carrying the flag next to her commander, Manol Rizov. She was compared to Rayna Knyaginya, who had carried the flag alongside Georgi Benkovski during the April Uprising of 1876, and Grancharova was thereafter nicknamed the "Rayna Knyaginya of Kastoria" (Bulgarian: Костурската Райна Княгиня).

Following the Ilinden Uprising, Grancharova was arrested a second time in Neveska (today Nymfaio), but was given amnesty and released. Afterward, she returned to her home town of Zagorichani. When her brother Vangel's widow Zoya Belova died during the 1918 flu pandemic, Maslina Grancharova took in Zoya's orphaned fifteen-year-old daughter Kitcha (born 20 October 1903).

In 1924, Maslina Grancharova arranged for Kitcha to be married to Sotir Tancheff, a native of Tikveni (modern day Kolokythou) who had obtained United States citizenship during World War I by joining the United States 3rd Infantry Division. Sotir returned from the U.S. to Kastoria, where he and Kitcha were married. They then left for the United States, arriving on 7 November 1925.

Following the population exchange agreements Kalfov-Politis (1925) and Mollov-Kafandaris (1927) after World War I, the bulk of the Slavic population in Greece was forced to leave. As a consequence, some time after Kitcha left for the United States, Maslina Grancharova emigrated to Bulgaria and settled in Krivodol, where she found asylum from Greek prejudice against Bulgarians, feelings left over from the Macedonian Struggle and the following wars. She remained in Krivodol until she died in 1958. She was buried as a heroine, and in 1997, her gravestone was adorned with a commemorative plaque with a photograph depicting her in full guerrilla attire. Her actions were celebrated in Krivodol again in 2010.
