= Pteria, Kastoria =

Pteria
- Community
- Location within Greece
- Coordinates: 40°30′20″N 21°3′16″E
- Country: Greece
- Geographic region: Macedonia
- Administrative region: Western Macedonia
- Regional unit: Kastoria
- Municipality: Kastoria
- Municipal unit: Kastoria

Population (2021)
  - Community: 111
- Time zone: UTC+2 (EET)
  - Summer (DST): UTC+3 (EEST)

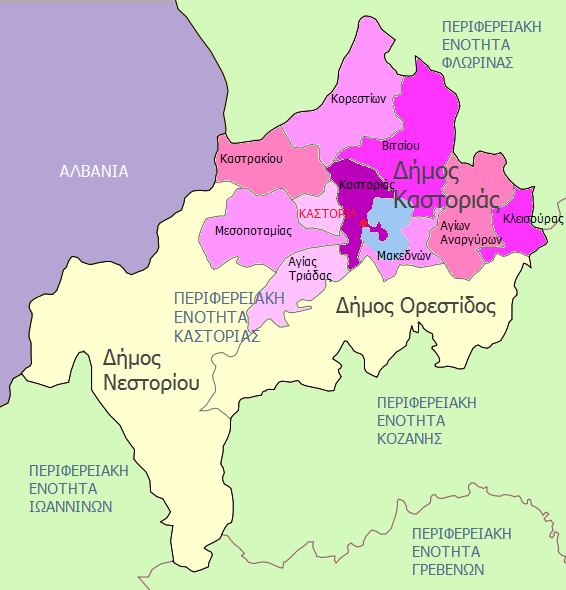

Pteria (Greek: Πτεριά, before 1926: Άνω Παπράτσκο – Ano Papratsko) is a village and a community in Kastoria Regional Unit, Macedonia, Greece. The community consists of the villages Pteria, Kato Pteria and Akontio.

The 1920 Greek census recorded 454 people in the village, and 450 inhabitants (60 families) were Muslim in 1923. Following the Greek–Turkish population exchange, Greek refugee families in Papratsko were from Pontus (50) in 1926. The 1928 Greek census recorded 294 village inhabitants. In 1928, the refugee families numbered 49 (194 people).

In 1945, Greek Foreign Minister Ioannis Politis ordered the compilation of demographic data regarding the Prefecture of Kastoria. The village had a total of 511 inhabitants, and was populated by 91 Slavophones without a Bulgarian national consciousness.
