= Agios Nikolaos, Kastoria =

Agios Nikolaos
- Settlement
- Location within Greece
- Coordinates: 40°29′53″N 21°23′45″E
- Country: Greece
- Geographic region: Macedonia
- Administrative region: Western Macedonia
- Regional unit: Kastoria
- Municipality: Kastoria
- Municipal unit: Agioi Anargyroi
- Community: Korisos

Population (2021)
  - Total: 26
- Time zone: UTC+2 (EET)
  - Summer (DST): UTC+3 (EEST)

Agios Nikolaos (Greek: Άγιος Νικόλαος, before 1955: Τσιρίλοβον – Tsirilovon) is a village in Kastoria Regional Unit, Macedonia, Greece. It is part of the community of Korisos.

In 1945, Greek Foreign Minister Ioannis Politis ordered the compilation of demographic data regarding the Prefecture of Kastoria. The village had a total of 139 inhabitants, and was populated by 100 Slavophones without a Bulgarian national consciousness.
