= Akontio, Kastoria =

Akontio
- Settlement
- Location within Greece
- Coordinates: 40°29′30″N 21°2′41″E
- Country: Greece
- Geographic region: Macedonia
- Administrative region: Western Macedonia
- Regional unit: Kastoria
- Municipality: Kastoria
- Municipal unit: Mesopotamia
- Community: Pteria

Population (2021)
  - Total: 1
- Time zone: UTC+2 (EET)
  - Summer (DST): UTC+3 (EEST)

Akontio (Greek: Ακόντιο, before 1928: Τέρστικα – Terstika) is a village in Kastoria Regional Unit, Macedonia, Greece. It is part of the community of Pteria.

The 1920 Greek census recorded 144 people in the village, and 115 inhabitants (18 families) were Muslim in 1923. Following the Greek–Turkish population exchange, Greek refugee families in Terstika were from Pontus (12) in 1926. The 1928 Greek census recorded 40 village inhabitants. In 1928, the refugee families numbered 11 (40 people) in 1928.
