= Verga, Kastoria =

Verga
- Settlement
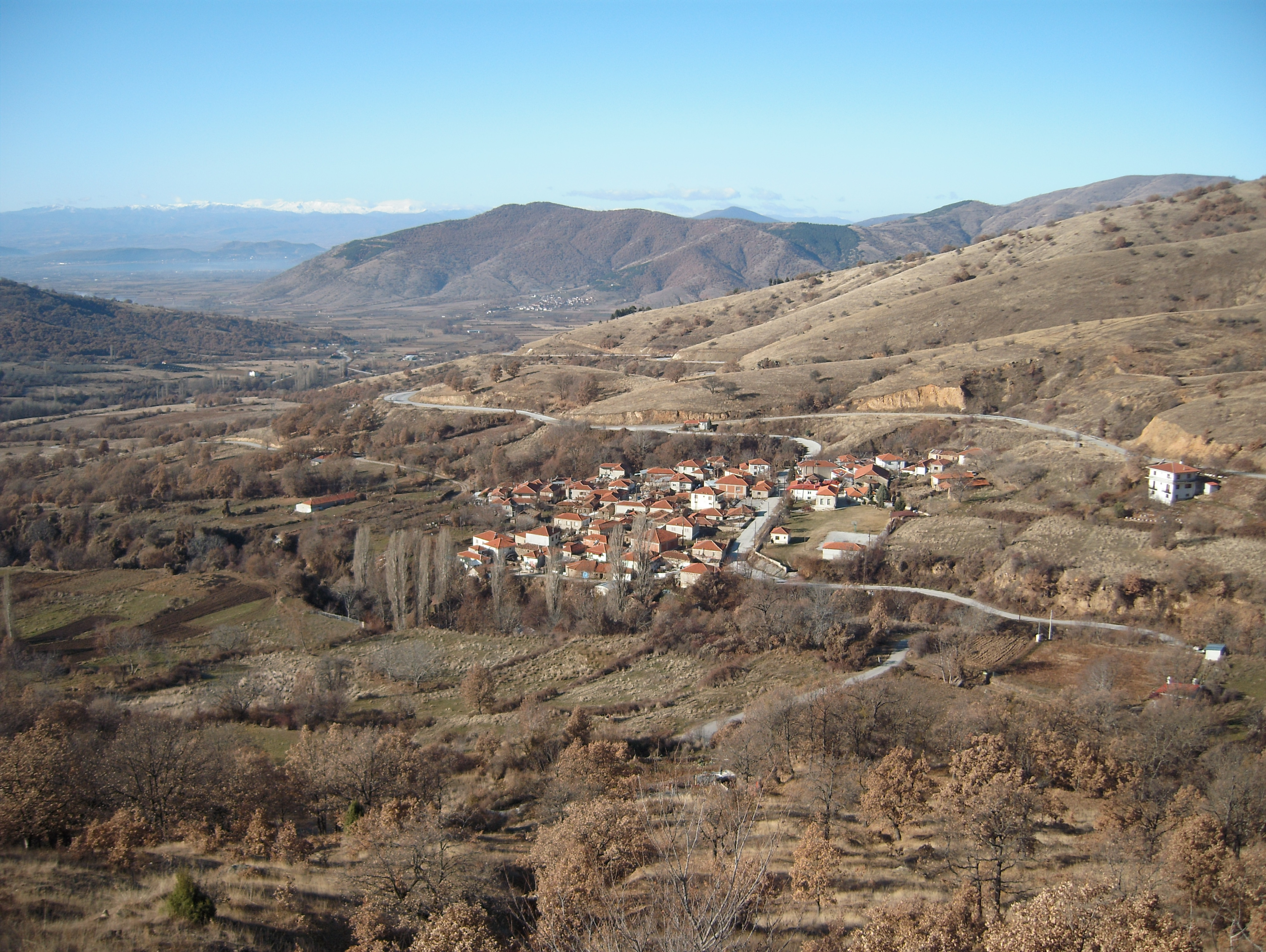
- Verga

- Location within Greece
- Coordinates: 40°33′8″N 21°26′46″E
- Country: Greece
- Geographic region: Macedonia
- Administrative region: Western Macedonia
- Regional unit: Kastoria
- Municipality: Kastoria
- Municipal unit: Agioi Anargyroi
- Community: Vasileiada

Population (2021)
  - Total: 73
- Time zone: UTC+2 (EET)
  - Summer (DST): UTC+3 (EEST)

Verga (Greek: Βέργα, before 1926: Μπόεμπιτσα – Boempitsa) is a village in Kastoria Regional Unit, Macedonia, Greece. It is part of the community of Vasileiada.

In 1945, Greek Foreign Minister Ioannis Politis ordered the compilation of demographic data regarding the Prefecture of Kastoria. The village Verga had 196 inhabitants, all populated by Slavophones with a Slavophones Macedonian national consciousness.
