= Vasileiada =

- Community
- Location within Greece
- Coordinates: 40°33′52″N 21°25′49″E
- Country: Greece
- Geographic region: Macedonia
- Administrative region: Western Macedonia
- Regional unit: Kastoria
- Municipality: Kastoria
- Municipal unit: Agioi Anargyroi

Population (2021)
  - Community: 375
- Time zone: UTC+2 (EET)
  - Summer (DST): UTC+3 (EEST)

Vasileiada (Greek: Βασιλειάδα, before 1928: Ζαγοριτσάνη – Zagoritsani; Macedonian and Bulgarian: Загоричани) is a village in Kastoria Regional Unit, Macedonia, Greece. The community consists of the villages Vasileiada, Agia Paraskevi and Verga.

Originally named Zagorichani, the village had a Slavic speaking population during Ottoman rule. After the rise of nationalism the locals were divided in pro-Bulgarian and pro–Greek community. During the struggle for Macedonia, a massacre occurred and around 80 Bulgarian inhabitants were killed on March 25 (April 7, New Style), 1905 by a Greek bands.

After Zagoritsani became part of Greece in 1913, the village mosque was demolished. The 1920 Greek census recorded 1,105 inhabitants in the village. Following the Greek–Turkish population exchange, Greek refugee families in Zagoritsani were from Pontus (32) in 1926. The 1928 Greek census recorded 735 village inhabitants. In 1928, the refugee families numbered 33 (112 people).

In 1945, Greek Foreign Minister Ioannis Politis ordered the compilation of demographic data regarding the Prefecture of Kastoria. The village Vasileiada had a total of 1,136 inhabitants, and was populated by 910 Slavophones with a Bulgarian national consciousness. The inhabitants speak the Popole variant of the Kostur dialect.

== Notable people ==
- Dimitar Blagoev (1856–1924), Bulgarian political leader and philosopher
- Anastas Yankov (1857–1906), Bulgarian Army officer
- Maslina Grancharova (1874–1958), Bulgarian teacher and revolutionary
