= Želenice =

Želenice may refer to places in the Czech Republic:

- Želenice (Kladno District), a municipality and village in the Central Bohemian Region
- Želenice (Most District), a municipality and village in the Ústí nad Labem Region

== See also ==
- Zeleniche, a village in Greece
