= Museum of Gold and Silver-smithery, Folklore, and History (Nymfaio) =

- Μουσείο Χρυσοχοΐας, Αργυροχοΐας, Λαογραφίας και Ιστορίας
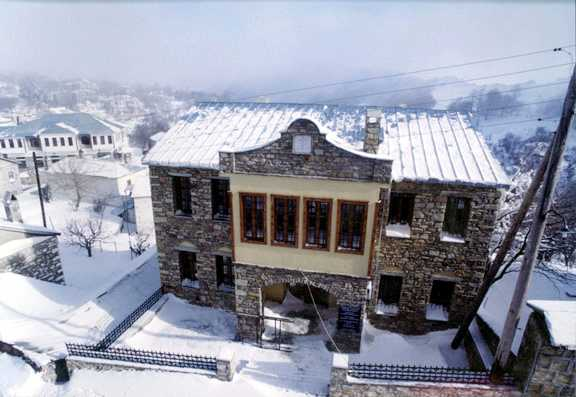
- Outside view
- Established: 10 September 2000
- Location: Nymfaio, Greece
- Coordinates: 40.64345205150408°N 21.49358268199271°E
- Type: Art museum History museum

Museum of Gold and Silver-smithery, Folklore, and History is an ethnographic museum located in the village of Nymfaio, West Macedonia, Greece. The museum was open on 10 September 2000 and inaugurated by Konstantinos Stephanopoulos, president of Greece in that year.

== Description ==
Nymfaio is a traditional Macedonian village with Aromanian heritage, turned into a resort. The museum is located in a three-storey town house in the centre of the village in the traditional style known as the Neveska House of Goldsmiths (Neveska being the old name of Nymfaio). The modern building is decorated with old mural paintings and furnished with authentic furniture and domestic amenities of a nineteenth-century house.

The museum has showcases displaying two sets of rare goldsmith's tools and a collection of goldsmith's work (including men's and women's jewellery, ecclesiastical objects, buckles, belts, snuff-boxes, and household utensils). There are also showcases displaying authentic women's costumes as well as photographs and other memorabilia of the Macedonian Struggle including original letters written by leaders of the Macedonian Struggle as Pavlos Melas, Euthymios Kaoudis, Germanos Karavangelis, Georgios Katechakis, general Papoulas, and documents from the Archive of Euthymios Kaoudis and Nikolaos Mertzos.

== Gallery ==
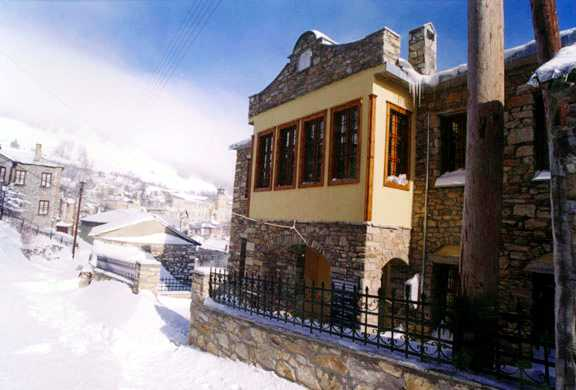
Outside view

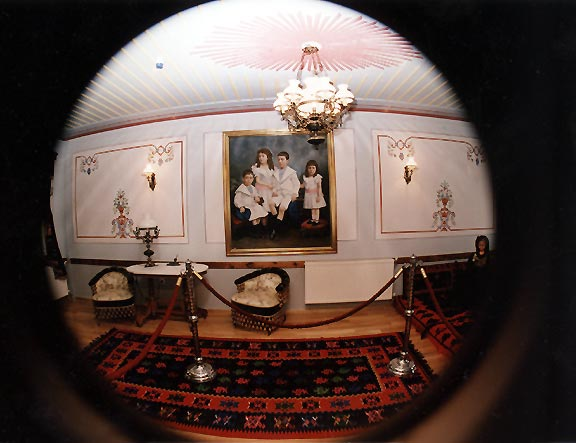
View of the interior

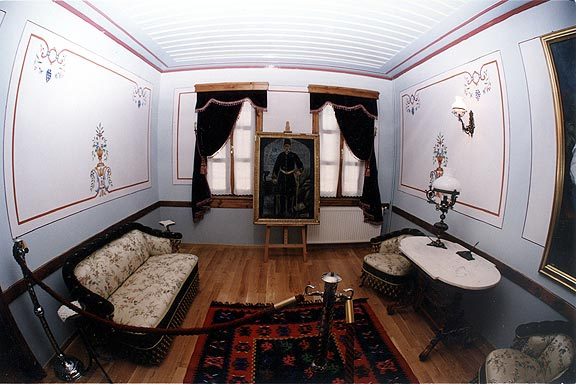
View of the interior
