= Korisos, Kastoria =

Korisos
- Community
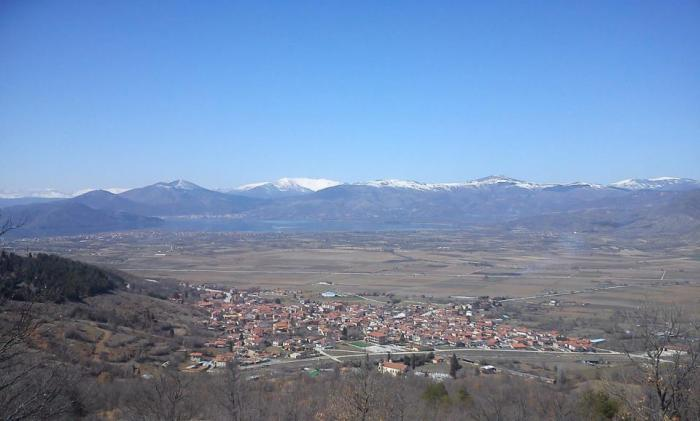

- Location within Greece
- Coordinates: 40°30′18″N 21°22′37″E
- Country: Greece
- Geographic region: Macedonia
- Administrative region: Western Macedonia
- Regional unit: Kastoria
- Municipality: Kastoria
- Municipal unit: Agioi Anargyroi

Population (2021)
  - Community: 902
- Time zone: UTC+2 (EET)
  - Summer (DST): UTC+3 (EEST)

Korisos (Greek: Κορησός, before 1919: Γκορένση – Gkorensi) is a village in Kastoria Regional Unit, Macedonia, Greece. The community consists of the villages Korisos and Agios Nikolaos.

The 1920 Greek census recorded 1921 people in the village, and 650 inhabitants (75 families) were Muslim in 1923. Following the Greek–Turkish population exchange, Greek refugee families in the village were from East Thrace (5), Asia Minor (67) and Pontus (15) in 1926. The 1928 Greek census recorded 1,468 village inhabitants. In 1928, the refugee families numbered 88 (358 people).

In 1945, Greek Foreign Minister Ioannis Politis ordered the compilation of demographic data regarding the Prefecture of Kastoria. The village Korisos had a total of 1552 inhabitants, and was populated by 775 Slavophones without a Bulgarian national consciousness.
