= Třebusice =

- Municipality
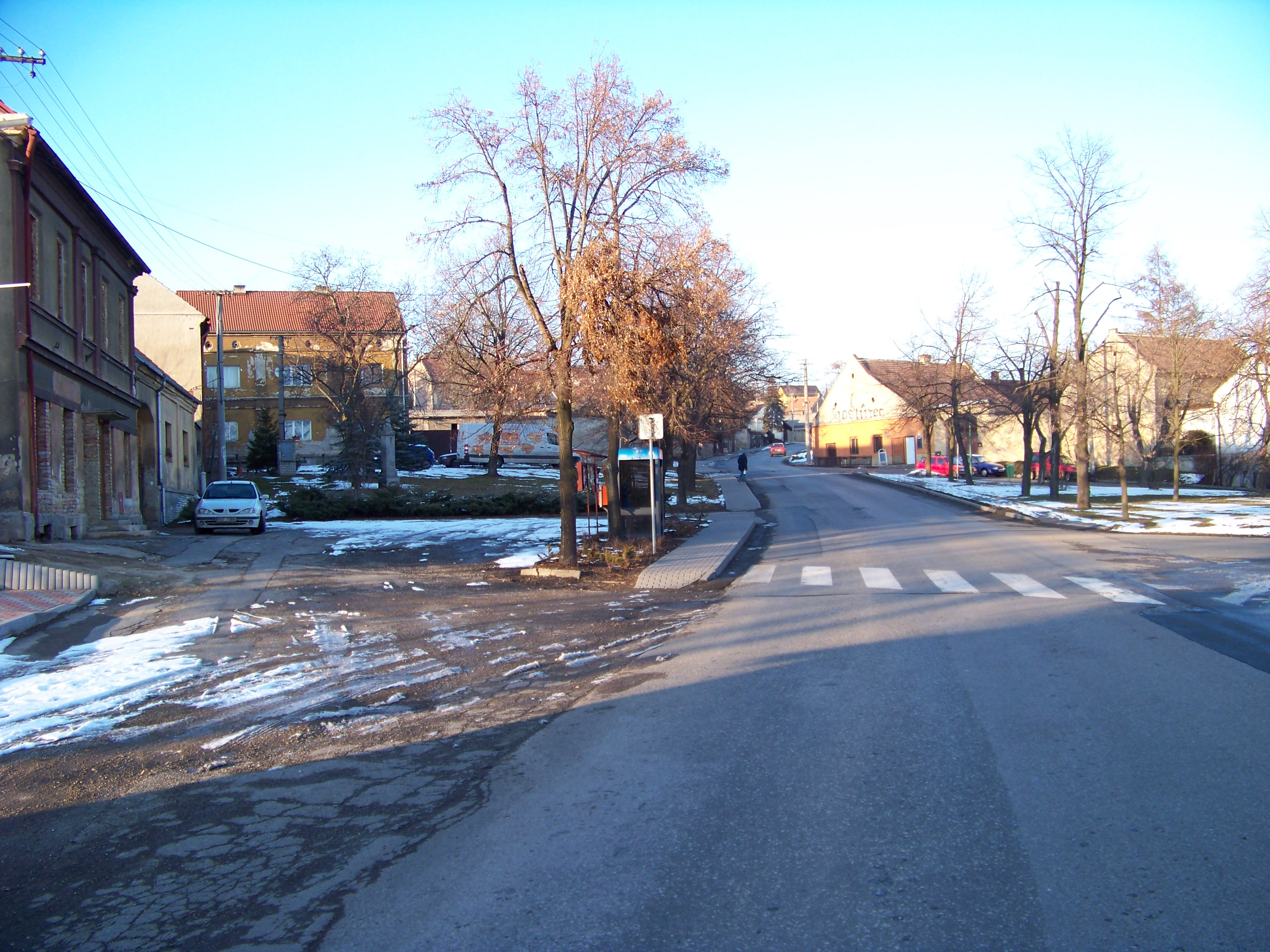
- Centre of Třebusice

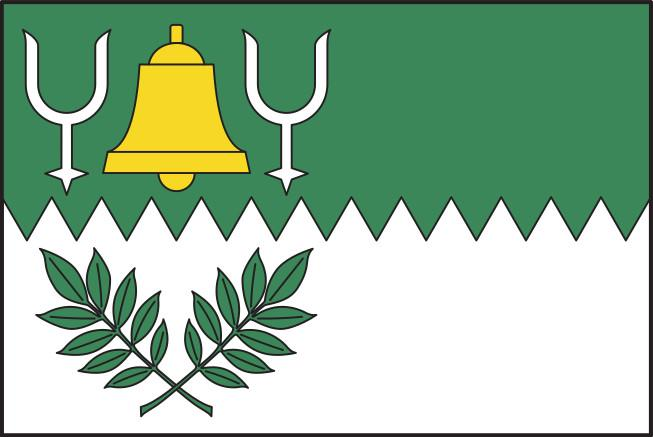
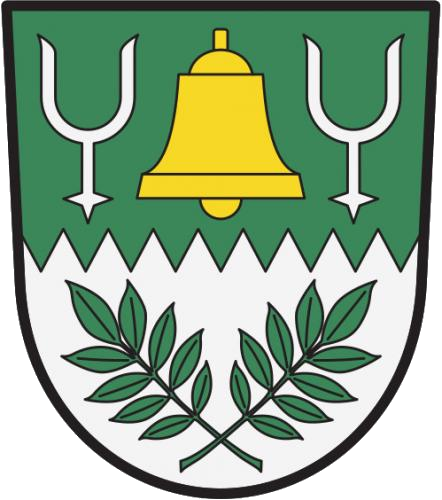
- Flag Coat of arms

- Location in the Czech Republic
- Coordinates: 50°12′3″N 14°10′51″E
- Country: Czech Republic
- Region: Central Bohemian
- District: Kladno
- First mentioned: 1228

Area
  - Total: 4.27 km^{2} (1.65 sq mi)
- Elevation: 295 m (968 ft)

Population (2026-01-01)
  - Total: 544
  - Density: 127/km^{2} (330/sq mi)
- Time zone: UTC+1 (CET)
  - Summer (DST): UTC+2 (CEST)
- Postal code: 273 41
- Website: www.trebusice.cz

Třebusice is a municipality and village in Kladno District in the Central Bohemian Region of the Czech Republic. It has about 500 inhabitants.

== History ==
On the border of the municipalitys of Třebusice and Želenice, a large cemetery of the Roman Imperial Age containing 960 cremation burials has been documented during several excavations between 1921 and 1963.

== Administrative division ==
Třebusice consists of two municipal parts (in brackets population according to the 2021 census):

- Třebusice (441)
- Holousy (21)

== Demographics ==
Historical population
Year	Pop.	±%
1869	412	—
1880	462	+12.1%
1890	563	+21.9%
1900	623	+10.7%
1910	714	+14.6%
1921	678	−5.0%
1930	662	−2.4%
1950	512	−22.7%
1961	554	+8.2%
1970	506	−8.7%
1980	453	−10.5%
1991	483	+6.6%
2001	477	−1.2%
2011	475	−0.4%
2021	462	−2.7%
Source: Censuses
