= Little Sofia =

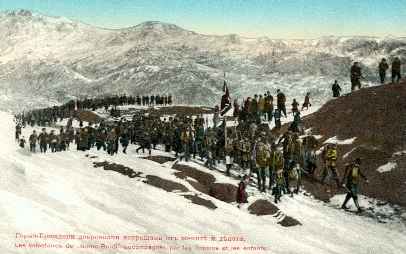
Bulgarian volunteers leave their native Gorno Brodi (today's Ano Vrontou), one of the villages nicknamed "Little Sofia", to join the Bulgarian Army's Macedonian-Adrianopolitan Volunteer Corps during the Balkan Wars (1912–1913).

Little Sofia (Bulgarian: Малка София, Malka Sofia or Мала София, Mala Sofia; Greek: Μικρή Σόφια, Mikri Sofia) is a designation applied to localities outside the modern borders of Bulgaria; it is used in the late Ottoman era to emphasize the population's strong Bulgarian national identity. The term most often refers to villages in the region of Macedonia during the late Ottoman era and for a brief period after (particularly in Vardar Macedonia and Greek Macedonia).

== Villages nicknamed Little Sofia ==
- Akir, Israel (for its Jewish Bulgarian population)
- Ano Vrontou (Горно Броди, Gorno Brodi), Serres regional unit, Greece.
- Dračevo (Драчево), Kisela Voda municipality, North Macedonia
- Lokvica (Локвица), Makedonski Brod municipality, North Macedonia
- Raotince (Раотинце), Jegunovce municipality, North Macedonia
- Vasileiada (Загоричани, Zagorichani), Kastoria regional unit, Greece
- Velgošti (Велгощи, Velgoshti), Ohrid municipality, North Macedonia
- Vevi (Баница, Banitsa), Florina regional unit, Greece
- Xino Nero (Екши Су, Ekshi Su), Florina regional unit, Greece
- Ydroussa (Долно Котори, Dolno Kotori), Florina regional unit, Greece
