= Dimitrios Golnas =

Greek chieftain of the Macedonian Struggle

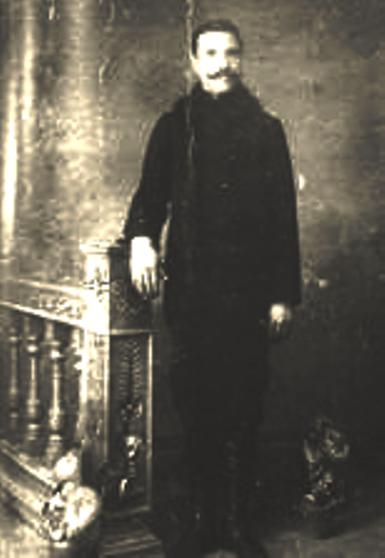
- Dimitrios Golnas c. early 1900s
- Native name: Δημήτριος Γκόλνας
- Nicknames: Takis; Τάκης
- Born: c. 1880s Neveska, Monastir Vilayet, Ottoman Empire (now Nymfaio, Greece)
- Allegiance: Kingdom of Greece
- Branch: HMC
- Conflicts: Macedonian Struggle †
- Other work: Chairman of the Neveska Struggle Committee

Dimitrios (Takis) Golnas (Greek: Δημήτριος Γκόλνας) was a Greek chieftain of the Macedonian Struggle.

== Biography ==
Golnas was born in the 1880s in Neveska (now Nymfaio) of Florina. From early on he participated in guerrilla groups of the region with the aim of limiting the action of the Bulgarian komitadjis. He participated in the bodies of Georgios Dikonymos Makris and Ioannis Kalogeris in operations against Bulgarian komitadjis in Strebeno (now Asprogeia) of Florina, in 1905. He then set up his own body of 15 men. As a chieftain he worked with his body in the areas of Lechovo-Drosopigi from 1905 to 1908. He also served as chairman of the Neveska Struggle Committee, which was set up to confront the Bulgarian danger.

The spread of rumours that he was an agent of the Bulgarians led the secret Greek organization "Athena" to issue an order for his extermination. When he learned of these rumours, he travelled to the Greek consulate of Monastir to ask for explanations from the Greek consul Nikolaos Xydakis. Golnas was declared innocent, but upon leaving the consulate, he fell into an ambush by an execution squad organized by the Greek Youth of Monastir. Unaware of the latest developments, they attacked and seriously injured Golnas.

He died during his transportation to the Greek hospital of Monastir in 1908.

== Sources ==
- "Ημερολόγιο Βάρδα 1904-1907", diligence Γ. Πετσίβα, volume Α΄, p. 128, 169
- "Αφανείς, Γηγενείς Μακεδονομάχοι", editor: John S. Koliopoulos, Society for Macedonian Studies, University Studio Press, 2008
