= Sklithro, Florina =

Sklithro Σκλήθρο
- Community
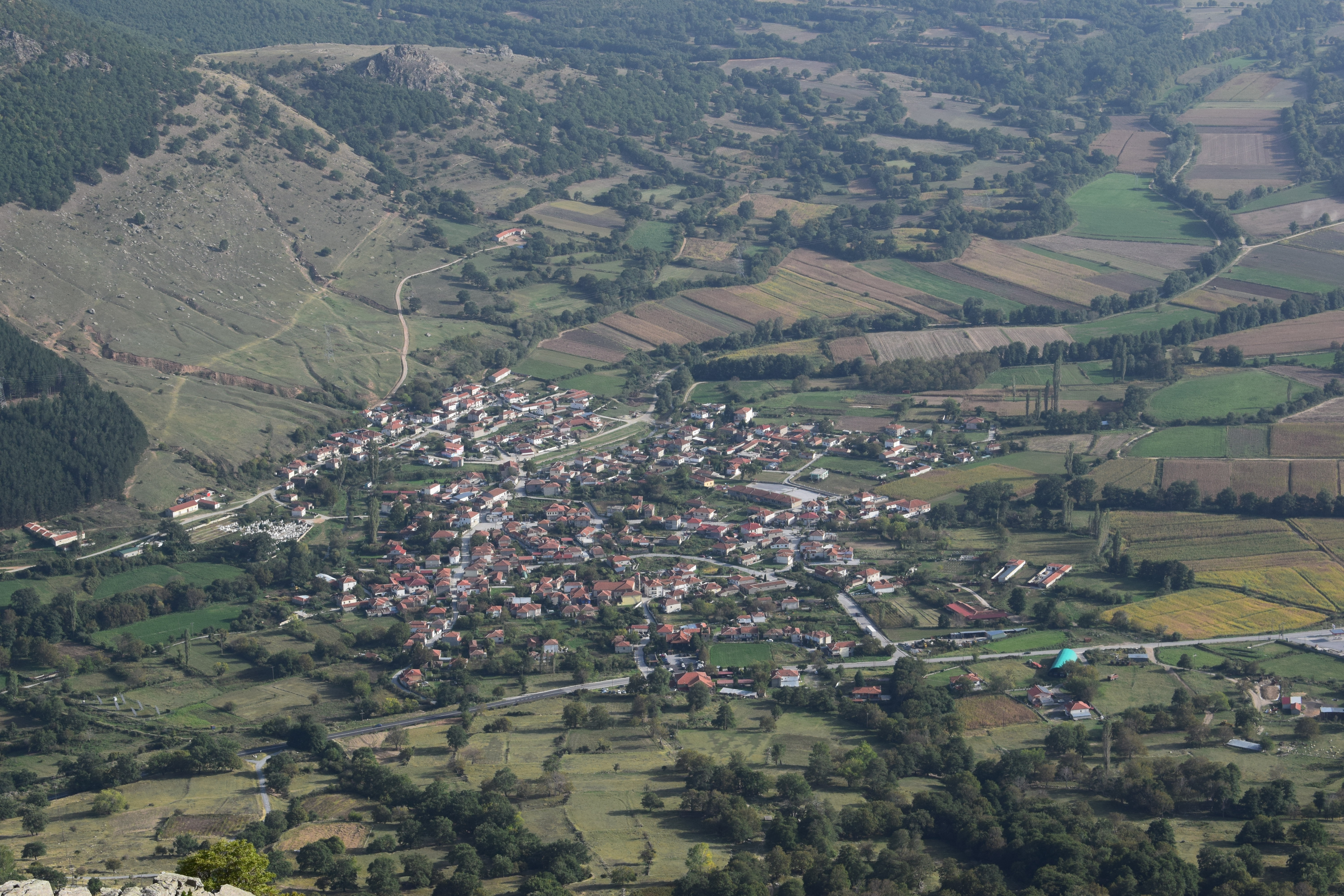
- Aerial view of Sklithro

- Location within Greece
- Coordinates: 40°37′N 21°30′E
- Country: Greece
- Administrative region: West Macedonia
- Regional unit: Florina
- Municipality: Amyntaio
- Municipal unit: Aetos
- Elevation: 680 m (2,230 ft)

Population (2021)
  - Community: 420
- Time zone: UTC+2 (EET)
  - Summer (DST): UTC+3 (EEST)
- Postal code: 530 75
- Area code: 23860

Sklithro (Greek: Σκλήθρο, before 1927: Ζέλενιτς – Zelenits; Bulgarian and Macedonian: Зеленѝче, Zelenìche) is a small village located about 40 kilometres southwest of Florina, the capital of Florina regional unit in northwestern Greece. It is situated in a valley at the foot of the Vitsi mountain range halfway along the Amyntaio – Kastoria local road.

Sklithro is currently inhabited by 420 permanent residents (2021 census).

== History ==
In 1845 the Russian slavist Victor Grigorovich recorded Zelenich as mainly Bulgarian village.

At its peak in the first part of the twentieth century, the population of the village had reached about 3,500 inhabitants. There were two Bulgarian and one Greek school in the village in the beginning of 20th century.

The 1920 Greek census recorded 2,219 people in the village and in 1923 there were 1,100 inhabitants (or 170 families) who were Muslim. Following the Greek–Turkish population exchange, Greek refugee families in Zelenits were from East Thrace (23), Asia Minor (53), the Caucasus (10) and three others from an unidentified location in 1926. The 1928 Greek census recorded 1,347 village inhabitants. In 1928, the refugee families numbered 87 (379 people).

The population decrease can be attributed to many causes including World War I, the population exchange with Turkey following the Treaty of Lausanne, World War II, as well as the Greek Civil War which affected Sklithro and the surrounding region. Following the Civil War, the village saw an exodus of people migrating to North America, Australia, and other European countries, where opportunity and a better way of life existed.

Sklithro had 623 inhabitants in 1981. In fieldwork done by anthropologist Riki Van Boeschoten in late 1993, Sklithro was populated by Slavophones and a Greek population descended from Anatolian Greek refugees who arrived during the population exchange.

In the modern period, the village is experiencing a bit of a rejuvenation. Many of the formerly abandoned homes have been or are in the process of being renovated. Agriculture continues to be the mainstay of the village and is celebrated with an annual potato festival in the month of August. During the summer months tourism also plays an important role, with visitors including former residents or their decedents. Also, nearby are the tourist attractions of Nymfaio and the Arcturos bear refuge.
