= Kolokythou, Kastoria =

Kolokythou
- Settlement
- Location within Greece
- Coordinates: 40°30′17″N 21°12′43″E
- Country: Greece
- Geographic region: Macedonia
- Administrative region: Western Macedonia
- Regional unit: Kastoria
- Municipality: Kastoria
- Municipal unit: Mesopotamia
- Community: Mesopotamia

Population (2021)
  - Total: 691
- Time zone: UTC+2 (EET)
  - Summer (DST): UTC+3 (EEST)

Kolokythou (Greek: Κολοκυνθού, before 1926: Τίκβενη – Tikveni) is a village in Kastoria Regional Unit, Macedonia, Greece. It is part of the community of Mesopotamia.

In 1945, Greek Foreign Minister Ioannis Politis ordered the compilation of demographic data regarding the Prefecture of Kastoria. The village Kolokythou had a population of 280 inhabitants, all Slavophones with 60 percent having a Bulgarian national consciousness.
