= Arcturos (organization) =

Greek environmental organization

- Αρκτούρος
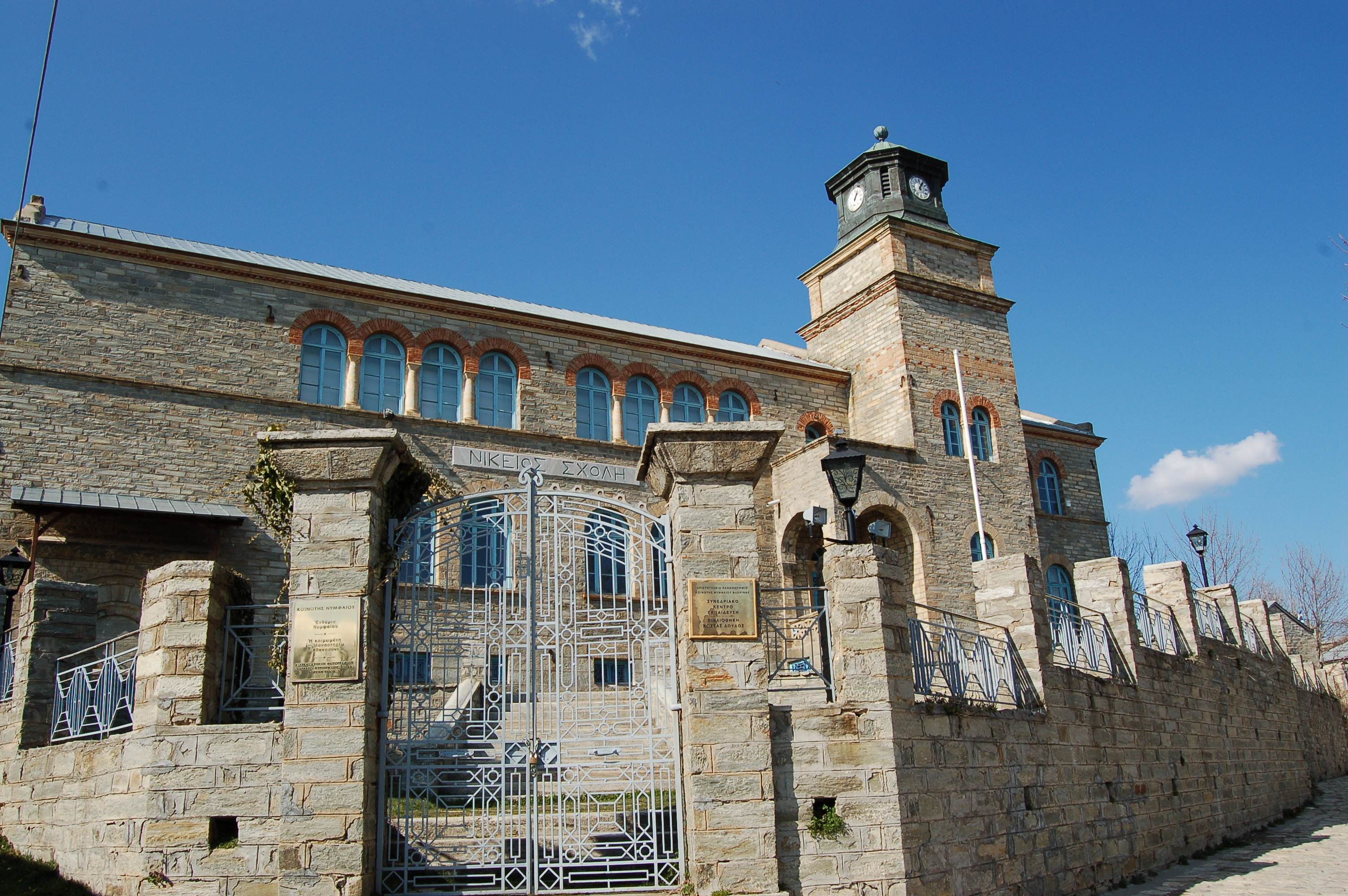
- Arcturos Bear Information Centre in Nymfaio
- Named after: Arcturus
- Formation: 1992
- Founder: Yiannis Boutaris
- Type: NGO, Nonprofit
- Purpose: Protection of wildlife fauna and natural habitat
- Headquarters: Nymfaio, Greece
- Region served: Greece and abroad
- Website: https://www.arcturos.gr/en/

Arcturos (Greek: Αρκτούρος, sometimes stylized as ΑΡΚΤΟΥΡΟΣ) is a non-profit, non-governmental, environmental conservation organization in Greece focused on the protection of wildlife and their natural habitats. It was founded in 1992 in response to wolf and bear hunting in Greece and the mistreatment of these animals, such as dancing bears for entertainment. The organization remains primarily concerned with the protection of these native populations of large mammals, including through lobbying for animal and environmental protection laws and their enforcement, and operating a number of wildlife sanctuaries. Among their other activities, the organization conducts scientific research, provides veterinary and rehabilitative care to wild animals, and works to reintroduce them into nature. The organization also collaborates across national borders, accepting animals from neighboring North Macedonia, Albania and Bulgaria, also working to protect shared mountainous regional ecosystems, and sharing animal population data with researchers in Slovenia and Croatia.

== Name ==
Arcturos (Greek: Αρκτούρος, Ancient Greek: Ἀρκτοῦρος) means "Guardian of the Bear", from ἄρκτος (arktos), "bear" and οὖρος (ouros), "watcher, guardian". The name is taken from the star Arcturus, the fourth-brightest star in the Northern Hemisphere.

The star is associated with the Ancient Greek myth of Arcas, a young man who was about to shoot his own mother, Callisto, not realizing she had been turned into a bear. Zeus rescued Callisto by placing her in the sky as the constellation Ursa Major, and Arcas became Arcturus, a star in the Boötes constellation, known in Ancient Greece as Arctophylax (Ἀρκτοφύλαξ) or "Bear Protector."

== Contributions ==
=== Animal welfare and nature conservation ===
In 1997, Arcturos was a key proponent in the passing of laws prohibiting the use of animals in circuses and of dancing bears. Despite listings as protected species in both Greek and European Union law, bears and wolves are still killed by humans, out of fear that the animals can harm livestock and cause property damage.

Since 1993, the organization has operated wildlife sanctuaries for Eurasian brown bears and Eurasian wolves that cannot be reintroduced into the wild, often as a result of injury or of being raised in captivity. At one time, the bear sanctuary included "three bears from circuses, five from a zoo, three orphans and one blind bear." More recently a sanctuary for Eurasian lynxes was also created. Arcturos has an Emergency Response Team (ERT) that attends to injured animals and car accidents involving wildlife. Injured or sick animals are taken to the Veterinary Centre in Aetos.

The organization has also supported a breeding program for traditional Greek Shepherd dogs since 1998. Aiming to reduce wildlife-human conflict, in which livestock farmers, whose herds graze in the native habitats of large carnivores, would trap or kill bears and wolves, often with poisoned bait, these dogs are given for a small fee (corresponding to the cost of early vaccinations) to farmers across the country for use as livestock guardians. These dogs have lived and worked in the region for centuries and have also been dwindling in number, with only 3,000 estimated left in the world. Conservationists at the organization therefore consider the program an effort to maintain both the breed and the traditional biodiversity of the region, and every year about 50 puppies are born in the program.

The organization also lobbies against road planning that threatens the local environment and plants trees in bald woodland areas in afforestation efforts.

=== Environmental Education ===
The Bear Information Centre in the village of Nymfaio accept visits from the public, where programs promote preventive measures for cooperative living in bear-heavy regions. It is housd in the historical building of the Nikios School.

=== Scientific research ===
Arcturos has been conducting genetic studies of the population of brown bears in Greece since 2003. In 2005, it launched the Hellenic Bear Register which has identified and monitored the movements of hundreds of bears using DNA samples collected from special hair-traps on utility poles. It also monitors bear populations using automatic motion capture systems in the Pindus and Rhodope mountains, as well as via telemetry with transmitter collars. In 2015, scientists documented a significant increase in Greece’s bear population since the start of the millennium: “With more than 450 registered bears, Greece’s bear population is considered one of the most significant in the Balkan region."

Arcturos is a member of the International Association for Bear Research and Management and in 2014 it hosted the 23rd International Conference on Bear Research and Management.

== Wildlife sanctuaries ==
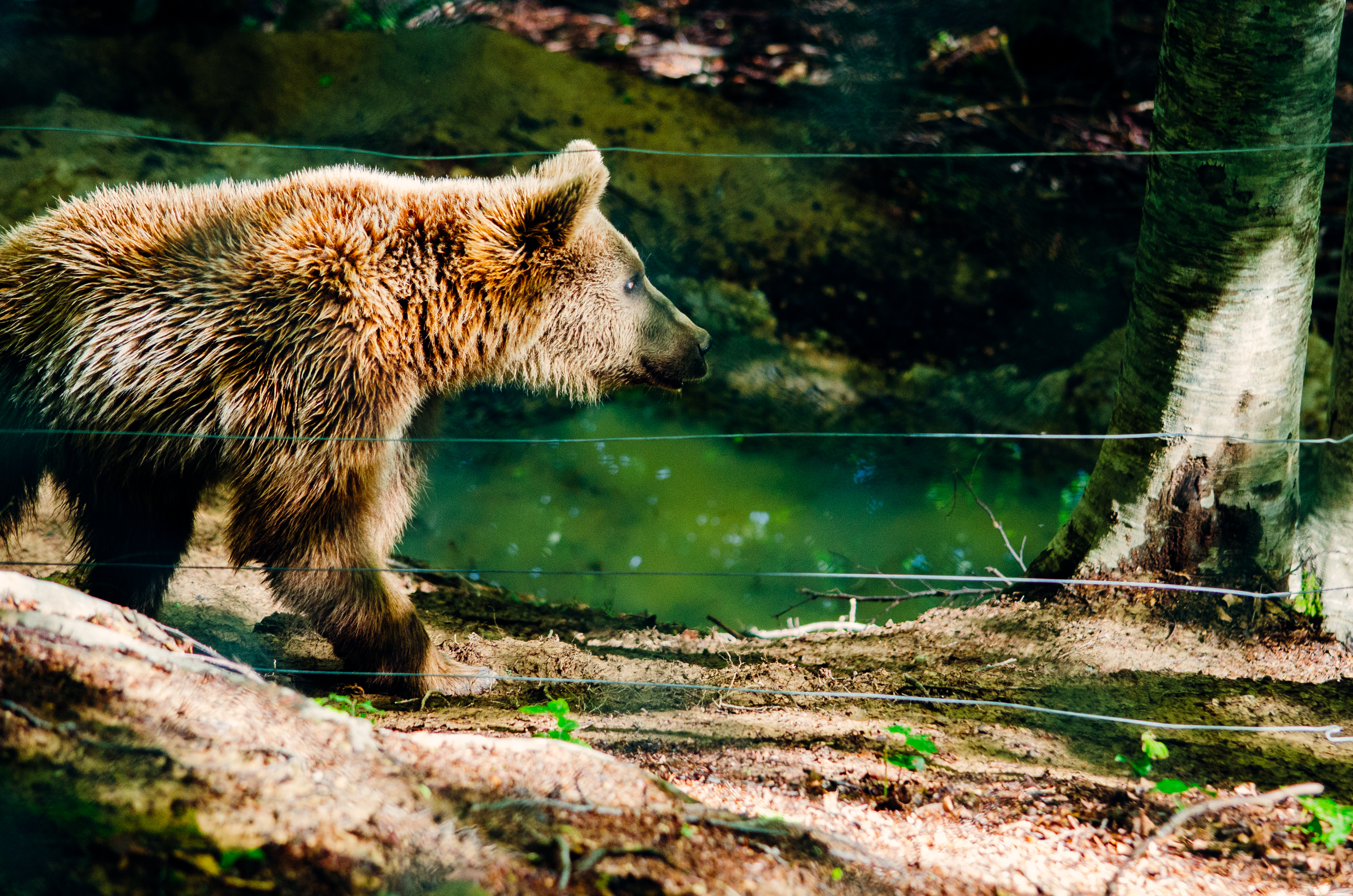
A bear in the Bear Conservation Area

=== Bear Conservation Area ===
The brown bear sanctuary opened in 1993 and is located near the village of Nymfaio at an altitude of 1,350 metres (4,430 ft). It consists of a 50,000 square metres (12 acres) fenced area of a natural beech forest. A special area of the sanctuary is dedicated to young orphan bears with the aim to release them into the wild. This sanctuary was also home to the oldest brown bear ever recorded, a male bear named Andreas who died in 2013 at the age of 50.

=== Wolf & Lynx Conservation Area ===
A separate sanctuary houses wolves and lynxes that cannot be reintroduced into the wild. It is located near the village of Agrapidies, at an altitude of 650 metres (2,130 ft) and consists of a 70,000 square metres (17 acres) fenced area of natural oak forest. It was created in 1993, at first only for wolves. A separate fenced enclosure for lynxes was created in 2021, after a group of 3 lynxes and 4 wolves were rescued from a zoo in Andorra.

== See also ==
- Prespa, Lake Prespa and Prespa National Park
- Kajmakčalan and the Voras Mountains
- Pindus Mountains
- Rhodope Mountains
- List of dog breeds originating in Greece
- Natura 2000
- Large Carnivore Initiative for Europe
