= Mesopotamia, Kastoria =

Village in Macedonia, Greece

Mesopotamia Μεσοποταμία
- Municipal unit
- Location within the regional unit

- Location within Greece
- Coordinates: 40°30′11″N 21°09′36″E
- Country: Greece
- Geographic region: Macedonia
- Administrative region: Western Macedonia
- Regional unit: Kastoria
- Municipality: Kastoria

Area
  - Municipal unit: 99.2 km^{2} (38.3 sq mi)

Population (2021)
  - Municipal unit: 3,855
  - Municipal unit density: 38.9/km^{2} (101/sq mi)
  - Community: 2,791
- Time zone: UTC+2 (EET)
  - Summer (DST): UTC+3 (EEST)
- Vehicle registration: KT

Mesopotamia (Greek: Μεσοποταμία, before 1926: Τσετιράκι – Tsetiraki; Bulgarian/Macedonian: Чéтирок) is a village and since the 2011, a municipal unit of Kastoria Municipality, in Kastoria regional unit, Macedonia, Greece. The municipal unit has an area of 99.173 km^{2} with a population of 3,855 according to the 2021 Greek census. The community consists of the villages Mesopotamia and Kolokythou.

== History & Geography ==
The village seems to be populated from the 15th century, eleven kilometers west of Kastoria. Mesopotamia was built in the middle of the flatland between the rivers of Haliacmon and Vrochopotamos, which springs at the peak of Alevitsa mountain from the Grammos mountain range.

At the end of the 19th century, there was a mosque and two Christian churches, while there were Ottoman, Greek and Bulgarian schools. The Muslim neighbourhood occupied the western part of the settlement, while the Orthodox Christian one occupied the eastern part. The parish mosque was located in the place where the community building was erected after the First Balkan War, while there were two churches, the parish church of St. Demetrios and St. Konstantinos and Eleni.

After the population exchange between Greece and Turkey, Mesopotamia received large Greek refugee populations, almost exclusively from Pontus.

== Sights ==
Mesopotamia has three Byzantine style Greek Orthodox churches. The most recent and largest is that of the cathedral of St. Peter and St. Paul. The oldest church is the church of St. Constantine and St. Helen which contains the village cemetery, and the church of Saint Demetrios. The chapel of St. George is a few kilometers outside of the village.

There is a Cultural Center as well. This center supports and preserves the local culture. It holds annual ceremonies on May 19, a day of remembrance for the population, at the Forest of Mesopotamia near the Haliacmon River. Finally, the town also has bars and nightclubs.

== Economy ==
Mesopotamia is a rural residential community. Its economy is almost dependent on the agriculture of wheat. It also houses small private fur industry that is outsourced from the major fur traders of Kastoria. As the former seat of the Aliakmonas municipality, Mesopotamia contains the Aliakmonas Municipal Building. It also contains a pharmacy, and a supermarket. The community of Mesopotamia has recently been linked to a branch of Northern Greece's A2 motorway (Egnatia Odos).

== Sports ==
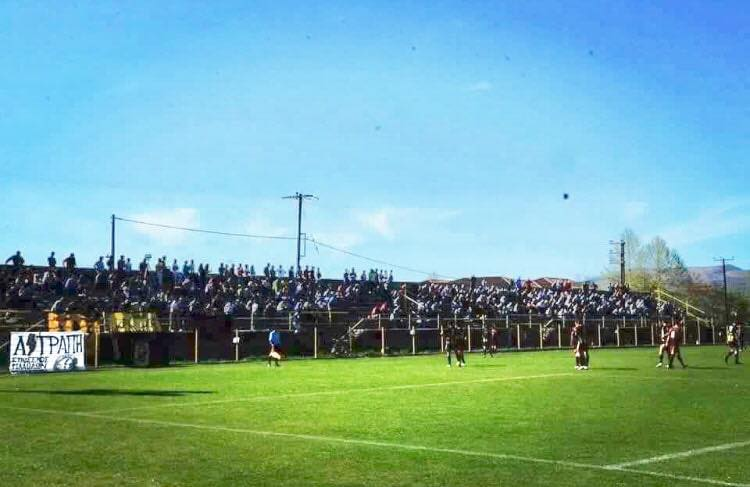
The football field of Mesopotamia.

Mesopotamia has a football (soccer) team called Astrapi Mesopotamia or simply Astrapi (Greek: Αστραπή) and its origin year is believed to be in the mid-1950s, 1956-1957. It hosts games at the Municipal stadium of Mesopotamia.

== Demographics ==
The 1920 Greek census recorded 1,021 people in the village, and 300 inhabitants (140 families) were Muslim in 1923. Following the Greek–Turkish population exchange, Greek refugee families in Tsetiraki were from Pontus (140) in 1926. The 1928 Greek census recorded 1,083 village inhabitants. In 1928, the refugee families numbered 141 (594 people).

In 1945, Greek Foreign Minister Ioannis Politis ordered the compilation of demographic data regarding the Prefecture of Kastoria. The village Mesopotamia had a total of 1643 inhabitants, and was populated by 700 Slavophones with 80 percent having a Bulgarian national consciousness.

== Notable people ==
- Georgios Amanatidis, footballer, player of Olympiakos F.C.
- Anestis Afentoulidis, footballer, player of PAOK F.C. and A.S. Kastoria
