= Nymfaio =

Nymfaio Νυμφαίο
- Municipal unit
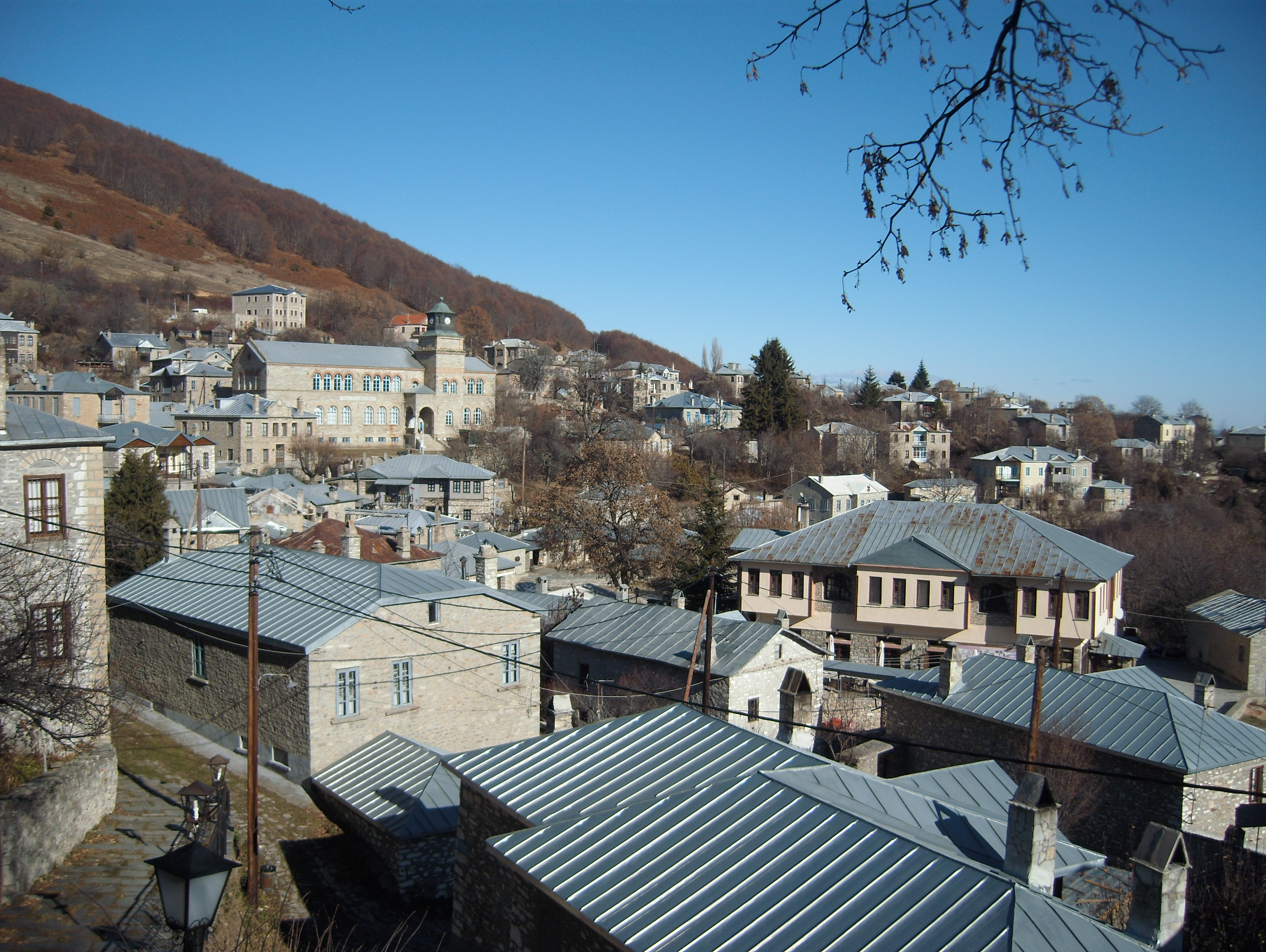
- The village of Nymfaio.

- Location within the regional unit

- Location within Greece
- Coordinates: 40°39′N 21°30′E
- Country: Greece
- Geographic region: Macedonia
- Administrative region: Western Macedonia
- Regional unit: Florina
- Municipality: Amyntaio

Area
  - Municipal unit: 28.2 km^{2} (10.9 sq mi)
- Elevation: 1,350 m (4,430 ft)

Population (2021)
  - Municipal unit: 63
  - Municipal unit density: 2.2/km^{2} (5.8/sq mi)
- Time zone: UTC+2 (EET)
  - Summer (DST): UTC+3 (EEST)
- Vehicle registration: ΡΑ

Nymfaio (Greek: Νυμφαίο, before 1926: Νέβεσκα – Neveska; Aromanian: Nevesca) is a village and a former community in Florina regional unit, Western Macedonia, Greece. After the 2011 local government reform it became a member of the municipality Amyntaio. The municipal unit has an area of 28.209 km^{2}. As of 2021 the village had a population of 63 residents. The village is protected by the Hellenic Ministry of Culture in order to preserve its architectural integrity.

== Name ==
First mentioned in an Ottoman defter in 1481, the village, then known as Neveska, had only six households. The name of the town in Aromanian (Vlach) is Nevesca from the ancient Greek (Doric) νυφεσος´, meaning snowy, snowclad.

== Geography ==
Nymfaio is a mountain village, situated at 1350 m elevation in the densely forested Verno mountains. It is 3 km north of Sklithro, 5 km west of Aetos, 16 km west of Amyntaio and 17 km southeast of Florina.

== History ==
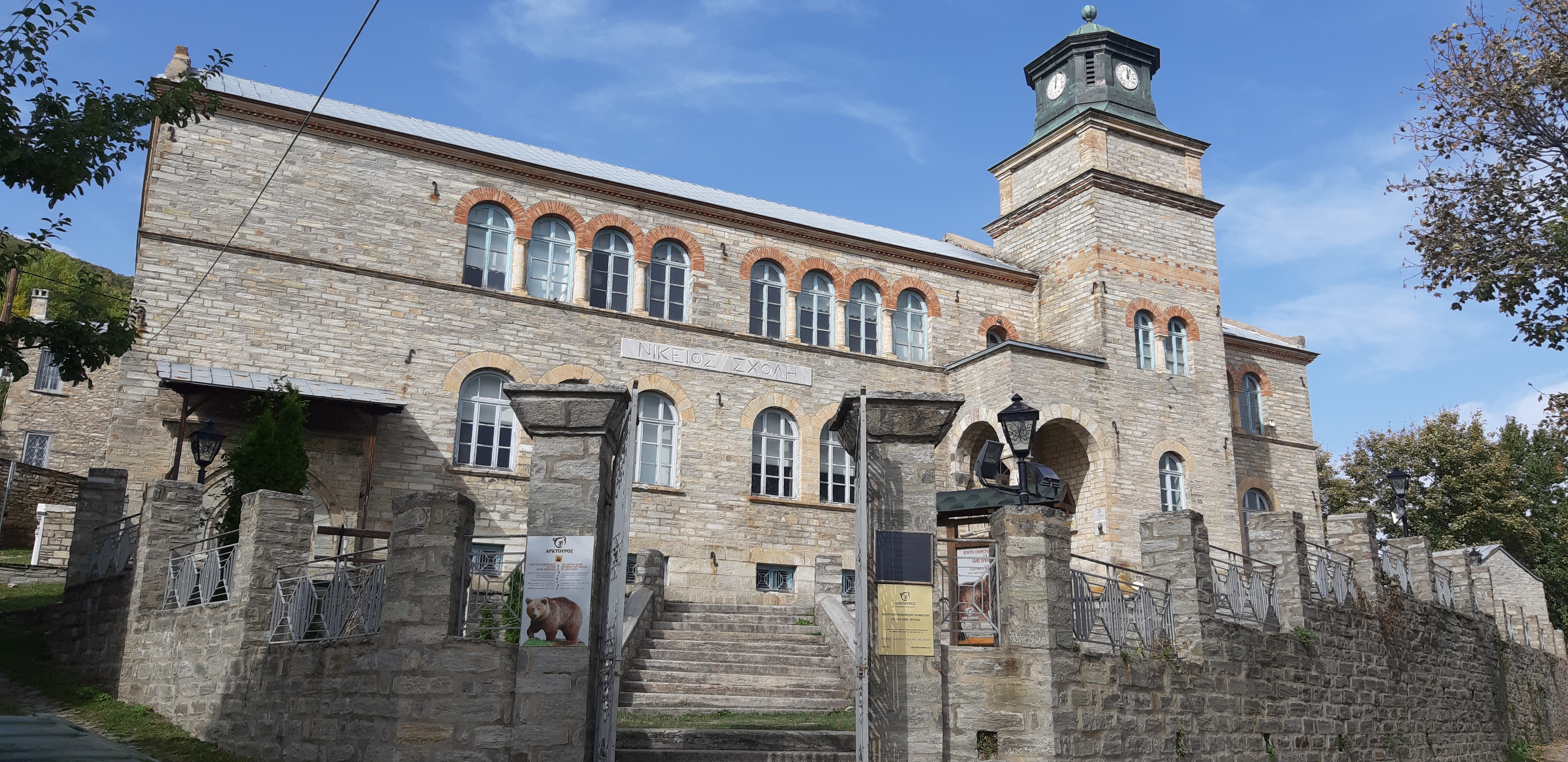
The old Nikeios School

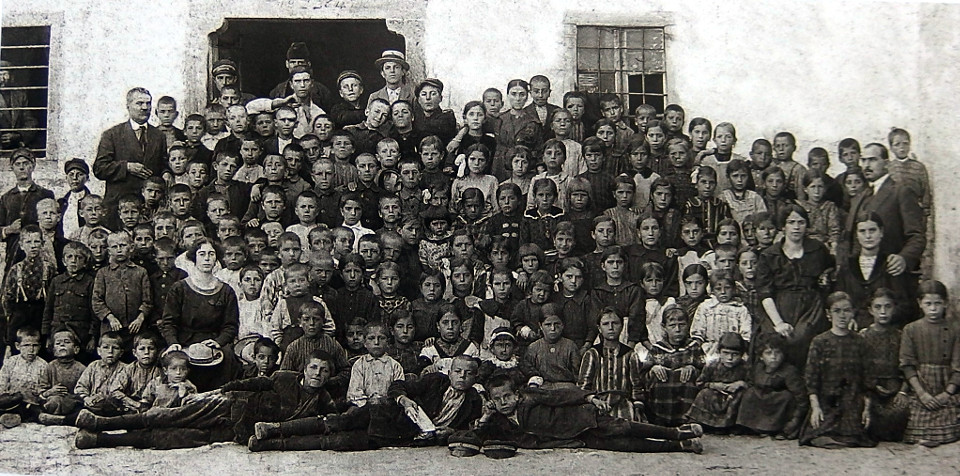
Old photo from the Greek school, c. 1910

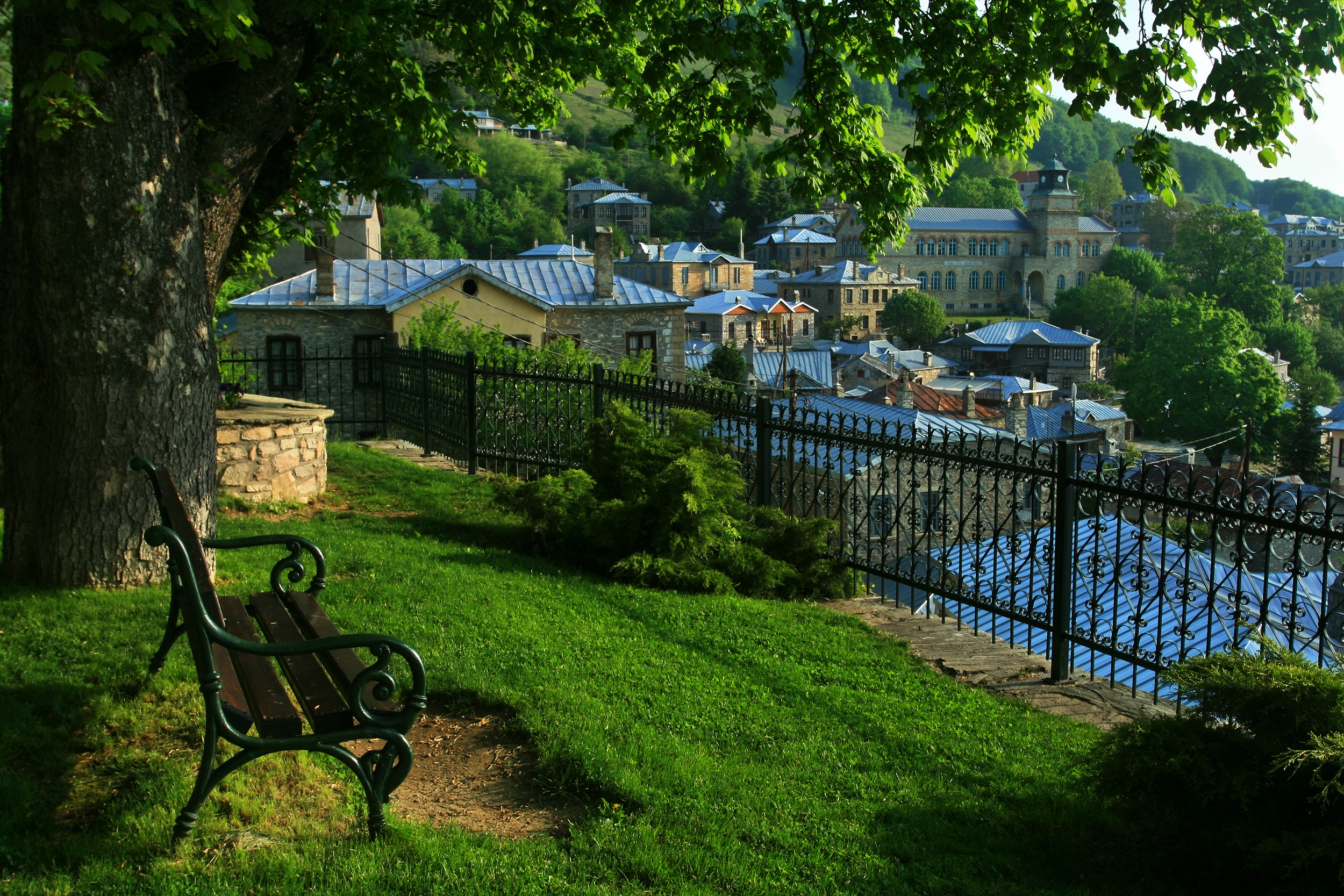
View of the village

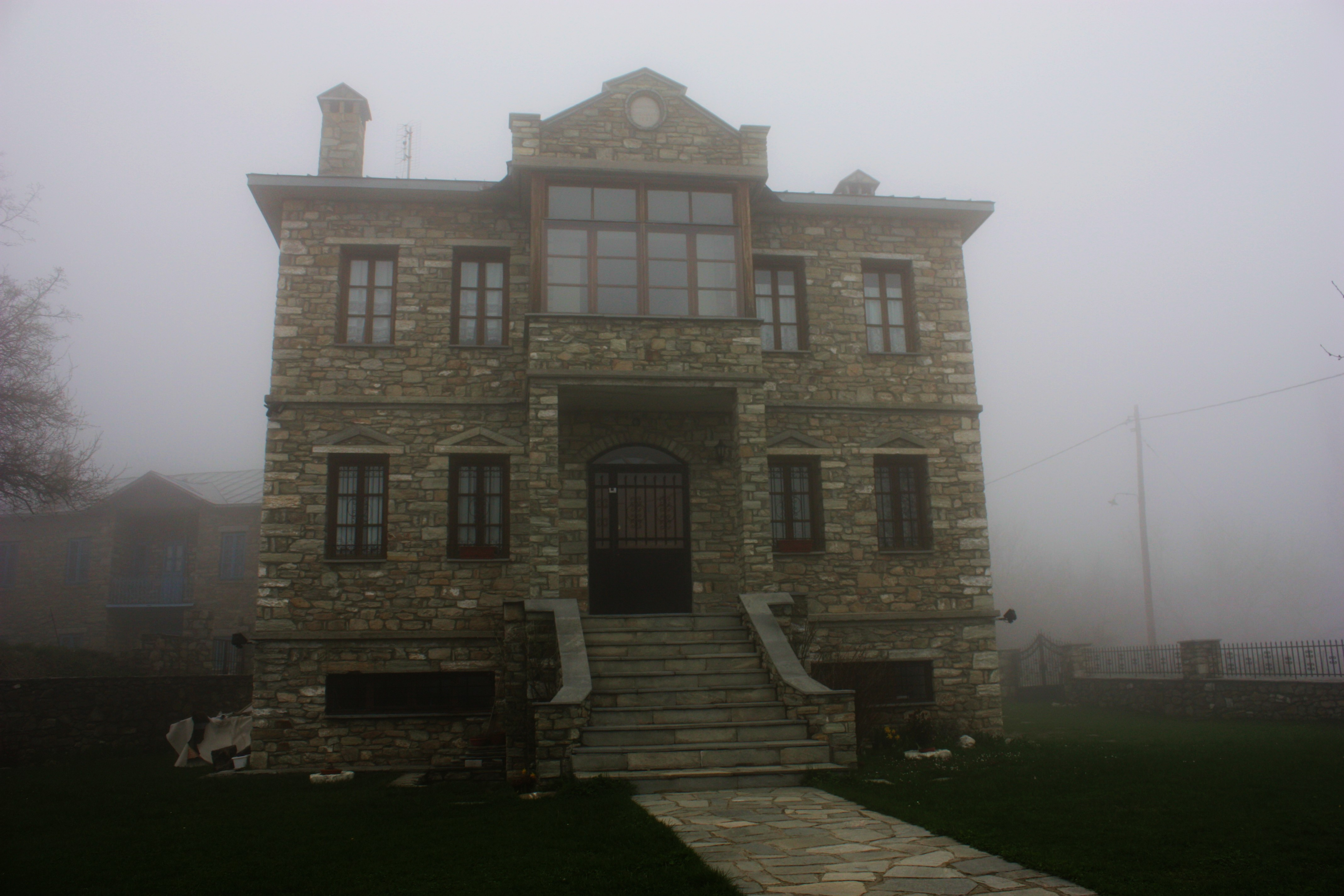
A reconstructed traditional mansion.

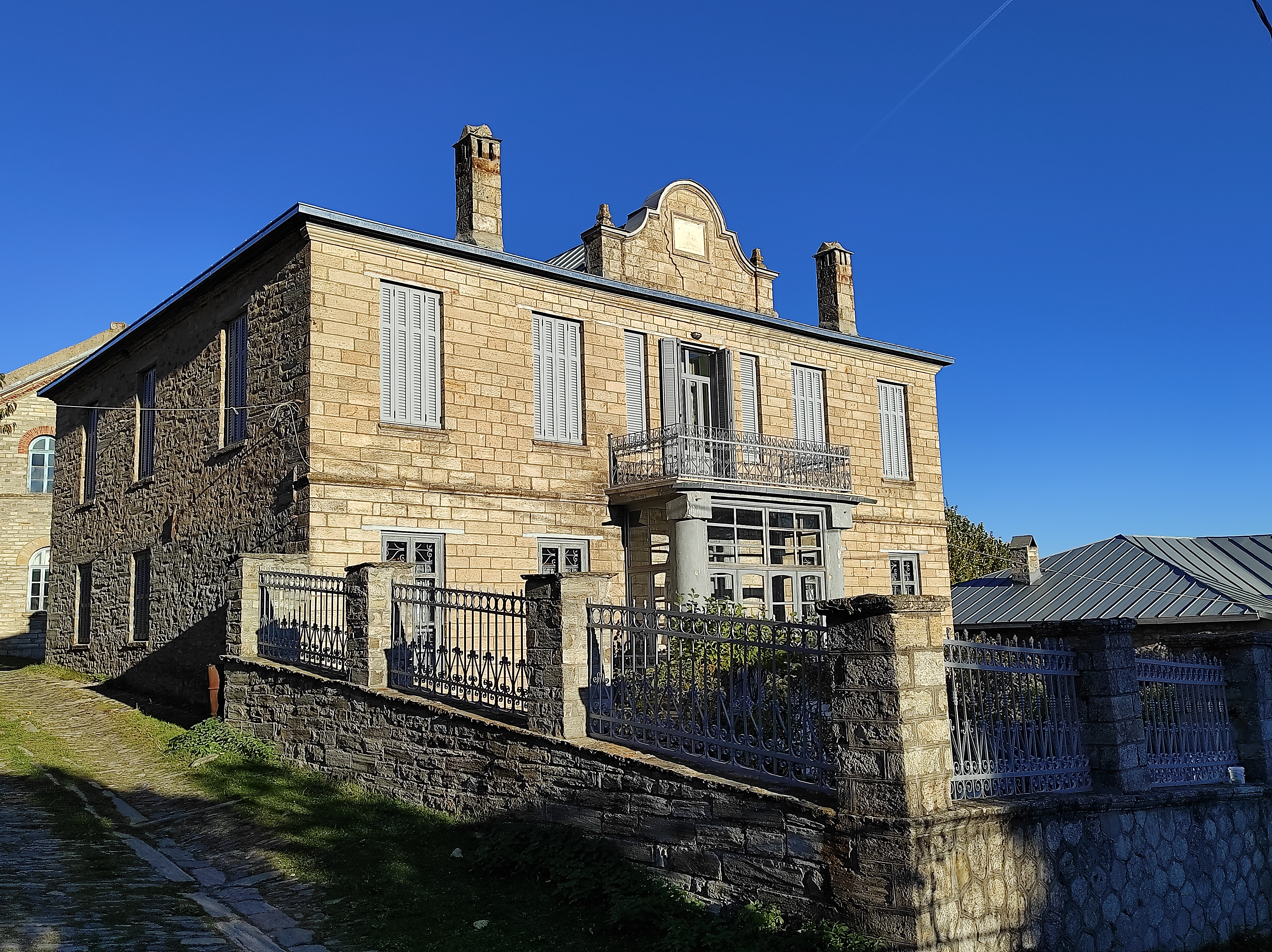
Misios mansion

Nymfaio, or Neveska as it was called then, was settled around 1385 by Vlach travellers, who fled into the mountains after heavy battles with the Ottomans. The fighters of Neveska capitulated conditionally: they remained armed and autonomous, directly ruled by Valide sultan (the mother of the Sultan), and paid reduced taxes. Until the early 17th century, their main source of income was raiding the estates in the plains. Around 1630, the village became a centre of silversmithing, known all over Macedonia for the next three centuries.

During the Albanian incursions in the late 18th century, after the Orlov revolt, Neveska accepted Vlach refugees from Moscopole, Nikolicë, Linotopi and other Vlach places that were ruined by the raiders. Furthermore, people from Neveska moved to places in eastern Macedonia, including Ano Poroia, Kato Tzoumagia, Alistrati, Nigrita, Serres and others. During the 1878 Macedonian rebellion, the revolutionary leader Vasileios Zourkas from Neveska operated in the areas of Varnous and Mariovo.

== Demographics ==
Nymfaio had 158 inhabitants in 1981. In fieldwork done by anthropologist Riki Van Boeschoten in late 1993, Nymfaio was populated by Aromanians.

== Culture ==
=== Sights ===
Nymfaio hosts a Museum of Gold and Silver-smithery, Folklore, and History, inaugurated in 2000 and located in a traditional building in the centre of the village. It displays furniture, artisan jewelry, and religious silverware. There are also showcases displaying authentic costumes as well as photographs and other memorabilia of the Macedonian Struggle, including letters written by leaders of the Macedonian Struggle as Pavlos Melas and Germanos Karavangelis.

The Environmental Centre ARCTUROS is active in the area, and manages an environmental protection center for brown bears and wolves one-and-a-half kilometres from the village. The center is home to 13 bears and several wolves that were believed too weak to survive in the wild. The information centre is open to the public for several months of the year. There are currently 6 functioning hotels in Nymfaio, as well as an Orthodox Church. Next to the church is an old cemetery dating to the 18th and 19th centuries.

== People ==
- Giannis Boutaris, mayor of Thessaloniki
- Nikolaos Mertzos, diplomat
- Dimitrios Golnas, chieftain of the Macedonian Struggle
