= Raotince =

Raotince Раотинце
- Village
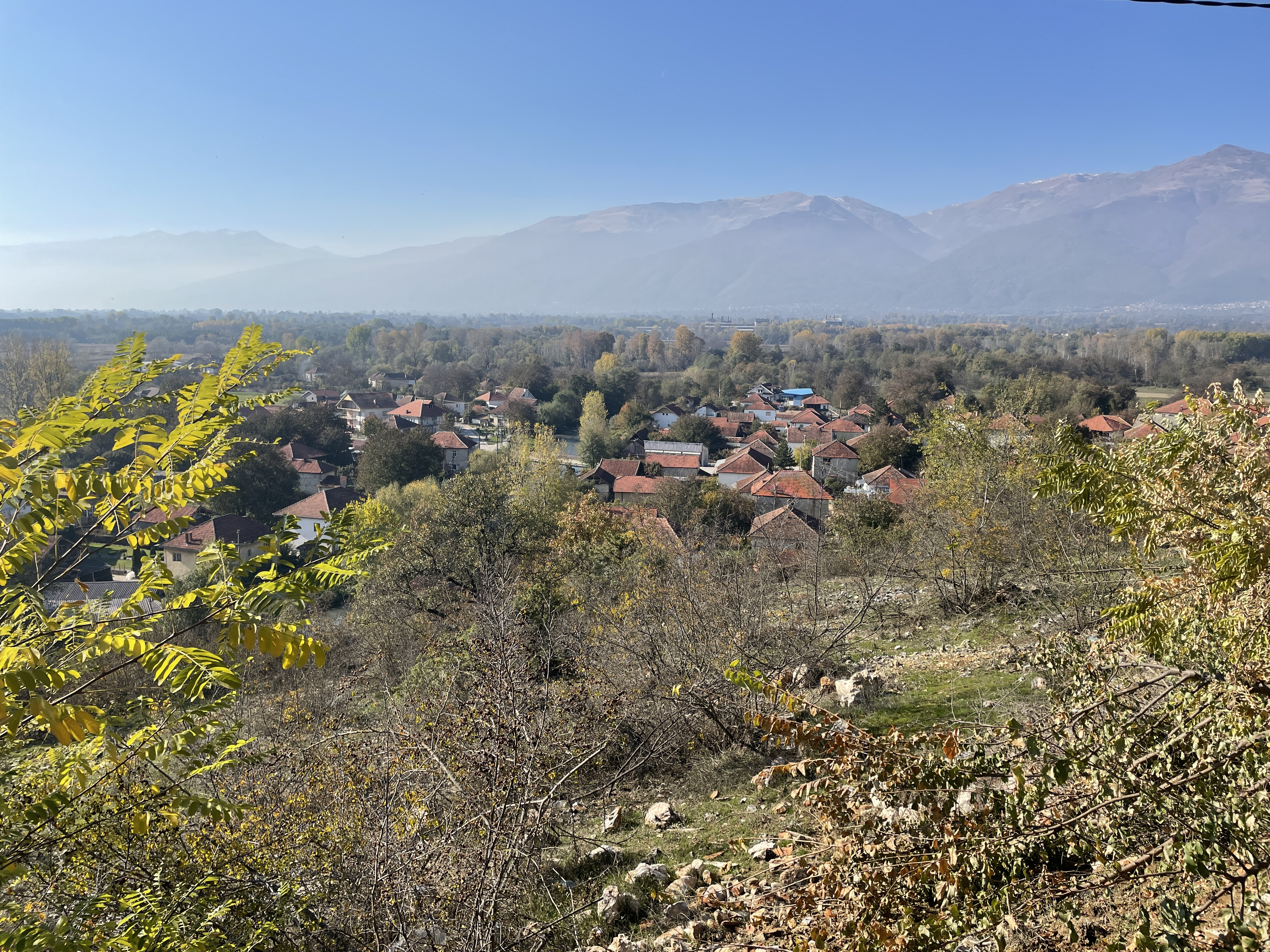
- View of the village

- Location within North Macedonia
- Country: North Macedonia
- Region: Polog
- Municipality: Jegunovce

Population (2002)
  - Total: 565
- Time zone: UTC+1 (CET)
  - Summer (DST): UTC+2 (CEST)
- Car plates: TE
- Website: .

Raotince (Macedonian: Раотинце) is a village located about 10 miles (14 km) northeast from the city of Tetovo in Jegunovce Municipality, North Macedonia.

== History ==
Raotince is attested in the 1467/68 Ottoman tax registry (defter) for the Nahiyah of Kalkandelen. The village had a total of 25 Christian households and 2 bachelors.

West of present-day Raotince is the Late Antiquity archaeological site Arbino, a former village from which many archaeological remains have been excavated. Its etymological formation stems from the old South Slavic ethnonym for Albanians, Arban.

== Demographics ==
According to the 2002 census, the village had a total of 565 inhabitants. Ethnic groups in the village include:

- Macedonians: 559
- Albanians: 4
- Serbs: 1
- others: 1

In statistics gathered by Vasil Kanchov in 1900, the village of Raotince (Raotinci) was inhabited by 360 Christian Bulgarians.
