= Agioi Anargyroi, Kastoria =

Place in Western Macedonia, Greece

Agioi Anargyroi Άγιοι Ανάργυροι
- Municipal unit
- Location within the regional unit

- Location within Greece
- Coordinates: 40°32′N 21°24′E
- Country: Greece
- Administrative region: West Macedonia
- Regional unit: Kastoria
- Municipality: Kastoria

Area
  - Municipal unit: 97.3 km^{2} (37.6 sq mi)

Population (2021)
  - Municipal unit: 1,826
  - Municipal unit density: 18.8/km^{2} (48.6/sq mi)
- Time zone: UTC+2 (EET)
  - Summer (DST): UTC+3 (EEST)
- Vehicle registration: KT

Agioi Anargyroi (Greek: Άγιοι Ανάργυροι) is a former municipality in Kastoria regional unit, Western Macedonia, Greece. Since the 2011 local government reform it is part of the municipality Kastoria, of which it is a municipal unit. The municipal unit has an area of 97.340 km^{2}. Population 1,826 (2021). The seat of the municipality was in Korisos.
