= Želenice (Kladno District) =

- Municipality
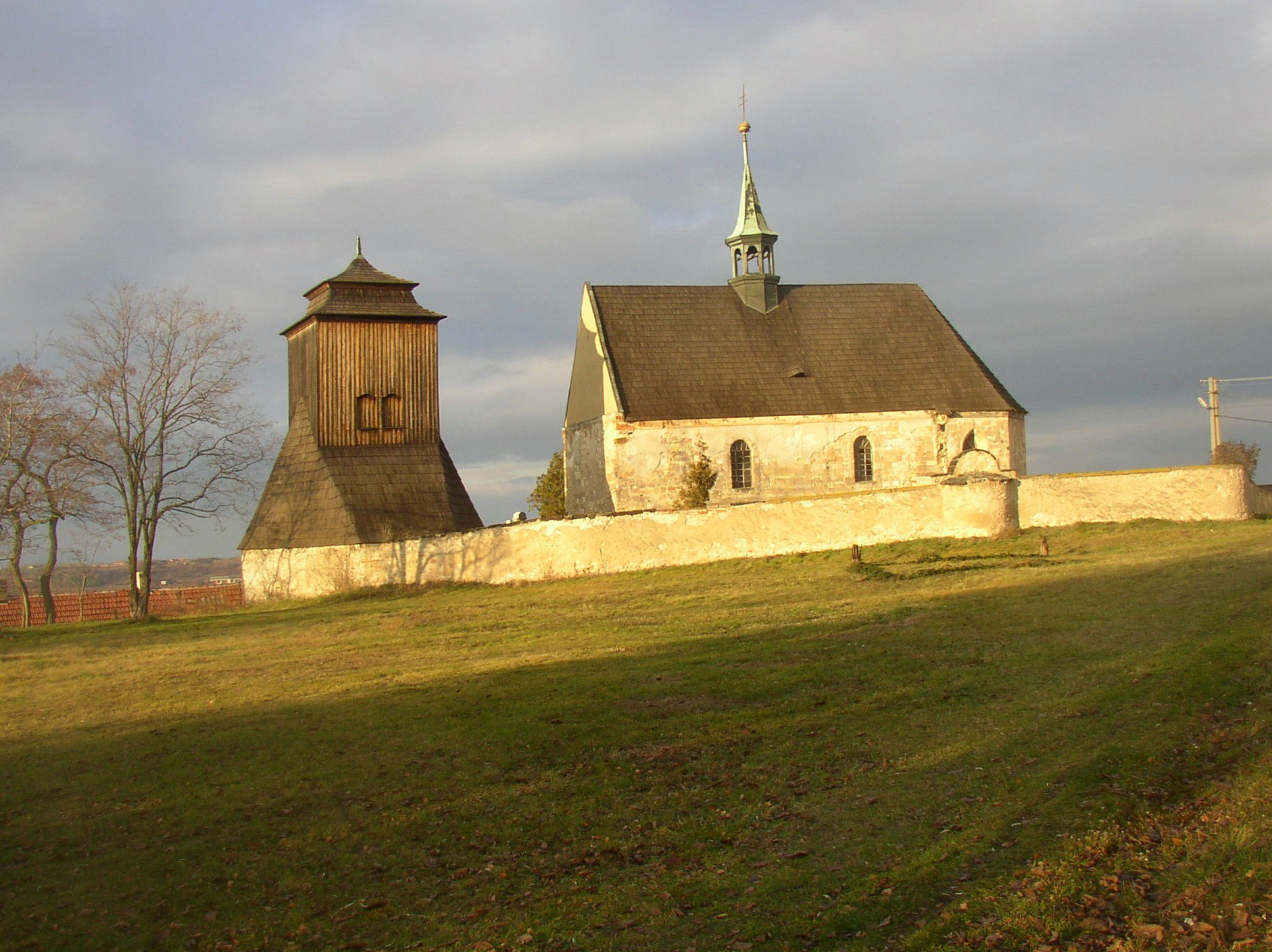
- Church of Saint James the Great

- Location in the Czech Republic
- Coordinates: 50°12′38″N 14°9′53″E
- Country: Czech Republic
- Region: Central Bohemian
- District: Kladno
- First mentioned: 1227

Area
  - Total: 4.67 km^{2} (1.80 sq mi)
- Elevation: 310 m (1,020 ft)

Population (2026-01-01)
  - Total: 208
  - Density: 44.5/km^{2} (115/sq mi)
- Time zone: UTC+1 (CET)
  - Summer (DST): UTC+2 (CEST)
- Postal code: 273 41
- Website: www.zelenice.eu

Želenice is a municipality and village in Kladno District in the Central Bohemian Region of the Czech Republic. It has about 200 inhabitants.

== Demographics ==
Historical population
Year	Pop.	±%
1869	222	—
1880	280	+26.1%
1890	265	−5.4%
1900	362	+36.6%
1910	343	−5.2%
1921	305	−11.1%
1930	322	+5.6%
1950	238	−26.1%
1961	262	+10.1%
1970	231	−11.8%
1980	227	−1.7%
1991	184	−18.9%
2001	173	−6.0%
2011	181	+4.6%
2021	186	+2.8%
Source: Censuses
