= Fur industry in Kastoria =

The fur industry is an important economic activity in Kastoria, Greece. The art processing of fur and the trade in species production developed during the Byzantine period and from then till today the region of Kastoria evolved and became the focus of global concern in the field of fur and unique processing center in Europe.

The development of the fur and the flourishing of trade in manufactures, resulted from the 19th century a significant number of local residents to travel around the world and create a multitude of economically prosperous communities. Today in almost all major cities like New York, Paris, Munich, Leipzig, Germany, Spain and Italy, and elsewhere, there Kastorians that supply the global market with beautiful samples of the fur art and technique. The region of Kastoria as one of the major global processing centers of production and marketing of fur is one of the most important sectors of Greek foreign trade and the national economy.

== History ==
The processing of Fur in Kastoria estimated that begins earlier than the 14th century when the city provided the ermine pelts for the lining of the robes of the Byzantine courtiers. From the 16th century onwards, growing demand for fur and a longer fur was widespread not only for protection from the cold but also as social promotion component. The furriers Greeks begin to import raw materials from abroad. Early traders settled in Russia and Germany. In the 18th century fur longer conquer the whole world. In 1894 it was an elegance sign since by then the processing was done manually. First introducing the stapling of cuttings technique in Kastoria, the industry of the fur started to industrialize. After Germany's division at the end of World War II, the fur center moved from Leipzig to Frankfurt. By the end of the World War II, the industry has been a great development thanks to the right technique and artistry of Kastorian furriers, making the region the main international fur processing center. During the Greek Civil War in the late 1940s, thousands of Kastorians migrated to the United States to take the place of aging Jewish immigrants who had formed the core of New York furriers. In 1984, 25,000 Kastorians were working and living in the area of New York, and 10,000 in Frankfurt.

Today the branch of fur ensure the responsible use of a renewable natural source raw materials. Not infect and does not disturb the ecological system as the raw material comes from farms rigorous standards fully respecting international norms established for ecosystem management. The industry maintains traditional forms of processing. The secrets of the art of fur inherited from generation to generation resulting in the modern evolution of the industry to be completed for not moving away from the tradition, so that the production maintains the specificity of that makes her stand out in the international market. Therefore, each fur is unique and is the creator and those who wear a work of high quality and technique. The city of Kastoria has built a modernized exhibition hall for an international fur exhibition that takes place every year!

== Production ==
Fur Goods

- Wolf
- Ferret
- Ermine
- Fox
- Siberian Weasel
- Mink
- Nutria
- Hare
- Squirrel
- Lutra
- Lynx
- Beaver
- Chinchilla
- Sable

Process

1. Sewing stripes and formation of fur
2. Cutting the skin in thin strips (xesyrma) – fully let out technique of cutting pelt into thin strips and then stitching them back together. Thin leather stripes can sometimes be interfered between the fur stripes to reduce fur density and volume.
3. Mitsarisma (leather cleaning process heads and feet urine and combination skins based mainly in coloring, length etc.).
4. Opening and stretching-drying skin.
5. Skin Soltarisma (classification per 25 pieces, based on common characteristics: genus-size-coloring).
6. Receipt of tanned leather fur.
7. Stamatoma (stretch) the specifications of the model.
8. Pikirisma (placement of internal lining)
9. Mounting the model
10. Close and check the coat
11. Final lining of the coat.
12. Final nothing and steam ironing
13. Temporary storage until the time of export.

== Organizations ==
Fur Association Kastoria "Prophet Elias"
Founded in 1915, it is based in Kastoria, have registered as members 1,090 furriers. He is the main organizer of the International Fur Fair of Kastoria, which is once a year ever since 1976.

Fur Association Argos Orestiko and Vicinity
Founded in 1983, it is based in Argos Orestiko of Kastoria.

Fur Association Nestori
Founded in 1969. Headquarters of the Association is Nestorio of Kastoria. The purpose is the study, protection and promotion of moral, economic and professional interests of its members and the development of the spirit of solidarity and brotherhood among them.

Fur Association Kleisouras
Founded in 1979. Edra of the Association is Klisoura of Kastoria.

Association of Fur Breeders
Established in 1984 and has 20 members. Headquarters of the Association is Kastoria, purpose of the Association is the development of fur farming, the study of the problems facing the sector, the seating configuration, proposals and submission of requests to solve them.

Retailers Association of Finished Goods Fur "Castor"
It is based in Kastoria and to produce social and professional interests of its members.

== Environmental concerns ==
The environmental movement appeared in Europe in the decade 1970-80 and created many problems in the fur industry. Eco fur characterized oldest synthetic fur. After strong protests actors Fur, issued market regulation which prohibits synthetic furs to be called ecological, since the oil-products can not be called ecological. So as ecological fur can only characterize the natural fur, because it comes from nature itself and is assimilated by it, in contrast with the synthetic fur that burden and pollutes the environment.

Environmentalists and after meetings and discussions with operators of fur convinced that eventually Kastorians not "opponents" of animals and of nature itself. Then the animal lovers were those who took "action" in business of Kastoria. Kastorians furriers characterize the movement as anti-fur and not ecological, because they believe that the motives of those who fought the fur was not so much love for animals and nature, but serve the interests of those who wanted to promote other clothing and not fur.

== Current Businesses ==
The fur industry in Kastoria has undergone significant transformation in recent years. Once a dominant force in the local economy, the sector has seen a marked decline due to changing fashion trends, increased activism, and tightening international regulations. Many long-standing fur businesses have closed down, and only a small number of new enterprises have emerged to take their place. Despite these challenges, some businesses continue to operate, maintaining Kastoria’s legacy as a center of fur craftsmanship.

In recent years, new and existing fur businesses in Kastoria have increasingly aligned themselves with international sustainability standards to meet growing consumer and regulatory demands. Many of these businesses are now certified under programs such as Furmark, a global certification and traceability system that ensures animal welfare, environmental responsibility, and product transparency across the entire supply chain. These certifications provide assurance that the fur used has been sourced and processed ethically, following defined standards. For businesses in Kastoria, participating in such programs not only strengthens their credibility in international markets but also helps reposition natural fur as a responsible, traceable, and environmentally preferable alternative to synthetic materials made from petrochemicals. By adhering to these standards, Kastorian furriers are redefining their craft.
