= Western Macedonia =

Administrative region of Greece

Western Macedonia Δυτική Μακεδονία
- Administrative region
- Coordinates: 40.4°N 21.5°E
- Country: Greece
- Region: Macedonia
- Decentralized Administration: Epirus and Western Macedonia
- Capital: Kozani
- Regional units: List: Florina; Grevena; Kastoria; Kozani

Government
  - Governor: Giorgos Amanatidis (New Democracy)

Area
  - Total: 9,451 km^{2} (3,649 sq mi)

Population (2021)
  - Total: 254,595
  - Density: 26.94/km^{2} (69.77/sq mi)
- Demonym: Macedonian

GDP
  - Total: €4.073 billion (2024)
  - Per capita: €16,761 (2024)
- Time zone: UTC+2 (EET)
  - Summer (DST): UTC+3 (EEST)
- ISO 3166 code: GR-C
- HDI (2023): 0.900 very high · 2nd of 13
- Website: www.pdm.gov.gr

Western Macedonia (Greek: Δυτική Μακεδονία, romanized: Ditikí Makedonía, Greek pronunciation: [ðitiˈki makeðoˈnia]) is one of the thirteen administrative regions of Greece, consisting of the western part of Macedonia. Located in north-western Greece, it is divided into the regional units of Florina, Grevena, Kastoria, and Kozani. With a population of approximately 255,000 people, as of 2021, the region had one of the highest unemployment rates in the European Union.

== Geography ==
The region of Western Macedonia is situated in north-western Greece, bordering with the regions of Central Macedonia (east), Thessaly (south), Epirus (west), and bounded to the north at the international borders of Greece with the Republic of North Macedonia (Bitola, Resen and Novaci municipalities) and Albania (Korçë County).

Although it covers a total surface of 9,451 km^{2} (3,649 sq mi) (7.2% of country's total), it has a total population of 283,689 inhabitants (2.6% of the country's total), thus it is a low-density populated region (30 per km^{2}, as compared to the country's 81.96 per km^{2} average). This is mainly due to the mountainous nature of the region, as 82% of the total surface is mountainous and semi-mountainous areas. This is also reflected in the population distribution, as a majority of the population (56%) lives in rural areas. The capital of the region is Kozani with 53,880 inhabitants. Other main towns are Ptolemaida (37,289), Grevena (17,610), Florina (19,985) and Kastoria (16,958).

== Economy ==
Map of Western Macedonia region

The region has one operational Industrial Area in Florina and another one under construction in Kozani. The secondary sector is very important for the Regional economy, mainly due to the mining activities, the production of electric power (70% of country's total power is produced in the Region) and the fur-leather sector. However, "soft" structures have not followed the general improvement of heavy infrastructures, a situation that has to be remedied, in order to achieve an overall higher economic development of the Region. The R&D services are at a rather low level: only 3,5% of the country's total research foundations are situated in the Region. Among them, the University of Western Macedonia plays an important role in supporting the regional research and educational efforts. However, an enhanced interaction with SME's will be a crucial factor, in order to improve the productivity and the added value of products and services generated in the Region of Western Macedonia. Some of its more famous products are marbles, Saffron (krokos Kozanis), fruits, Florina peppers, local wines (Kozani, Amyntaio), furs (Kastoria, Siatista) and specialized arts and crafts industry.

The A2 motorway (Egnatia Odos, Trans–European Network) that crosses the region, along with its two vertical National Roads, form a network that dramatically improves the transport conditions in the Region and alter its traditional "isolation" image, mainly due to its mountainous landscape. On the other hand, the railroad network is insufficient and the two airports (Kozani and Kastoria) can only serve small passenger planes. The telecommunication network has dramatically improved over the last decade, providing the regional population with adequate services and modern facilities.

The last years the region is being developed in tourism mainly on winter. It is the only Greek region without sea coast, but there are a lot of lakes, mountains, villages and two big ski centers in Florina (Vigla) and Grevena (Vasilitsa) and one other under construction in Kozani (Velvendos).

The administrative building of Western Macedonia region is located in Zone of Alternate Urban Planning (ZEP) in the city of Kozani.

The Gross domestic product (GDP) of the province was 4.0 billion € in 2018, accounting for 2.1% of Greek economic output. GDP per capita adjusted for purchasing power was 17,700 € or 59% of the EU27 average in the same year. The GDP per employee was 79% of the EU average.

The unemployment rate stood at 19.7% in 2021, one of the highest regional unemployment rates in the European Union.

Year	2006	2007	2008	2009	2010	2011	2012	2013	2014	2015	2016	2017	2018	2019	2020	2021
unemployment rate (in %)	14.2%	12.1%	12.5%	12.4%	15.4%	23.1%	29.7%	31.6%	27.6%	30.7%	31.3%	29.1%	27.0%	22.62%	20.5%	19.7%

== Administration ==
The administrative division of the Western Macedonia region in municipalities. In shades of yellow, the former Kastoria Prefecture, in red, the Grevena Prefecture, in blue, the Kozani Prefecture, and in green, the Florina Prefecture

As one of thirteen administrative regions, the Western Macedonia Region (Greek: Περιφέρεια Δυτικής Μακεδονίας, Periféria Dytikís Makedonías) was established in 1987, comprising the prefectures of Kastoria, Grevena, Kozani and Florina. In the absence of a working budget the administrative regions however remained unable to fulfill even their limited responsibilities, until in 1994 they assumed the prefectures' competences in regard to tax collection, European structural funding and treasury.

Resulting from the 2010 Kallikratis Programme, prefectures were abolished and instead, the regions became self-governing bodies in their own right with powers and authority being redefined and largely extended. Starting with the 2010 local elections, both the regional governor and the regional council have been popularly elected. From 2014 on, the elections are held together with the European Parliament elections for a five-year period.

The region is based at Kozani and is divided into four regional units (the pre-Kallikratis prefectures). It comprises 12 municipalities (down from 61 pre-Kallikratis local administrative units). Along with the neighboring Epirus region it is supervised by the Ioannina-based Decentralized Administration of Epirus and Western Macedonia.

Municipalities of Western Macedonia
	Municipality	Population	Seat
1.	Kozani	71,388	Kozani
2.	Eordaia	45,592	Ptolemaida
3.	Voio	18,386	Siatista
4.	Servia-Velventos	14,830	Servia
5.	Deskati	5,852	Deskati
6.	Grevena	25,905	Grevena
7.	Nestorio	2,646	Nestorio
8.	Argos Orestiko	11,802	Argos Orestiko
9.	Kastoria	35,874	Kastoria
10.	Prespes	1,560	Laimos
11.	Florina	32,881	Florina
12.	Amyntaio	16,973	Amyntaio

== History ==
The modern region of Western Macedonia roughly corresponds to the ancient Greek regions of Orestis, Elimiotis, Eordaea, Tymphaea, part of Lynkestis, of Upper Macedonia. Some scholars suggest that the Argead Macedonians wandered from Orestis to Lower Macedonia where they founded the ancient Greek kingdom of Macedon. According to N. G. L. Hammond, in the region of Upper Macedonia, the tribes of Elimiotes in the region of Kozani, Orestes in the region of Kastoria and Lyncestae in the region of Florina were all Epirotic tribes and they talked the Northwest Greek dialect. Three major Hellenistic dynasties succeeding Alexander the Great's empire, may have originated from Upper Macedonia; Ptolemy's father Lagus from Eordaea, Antiochus (father of Seleucus I Nicator) from Orestis and Antigonus Monophthalmus from Elimiotis.

== Demographics ==
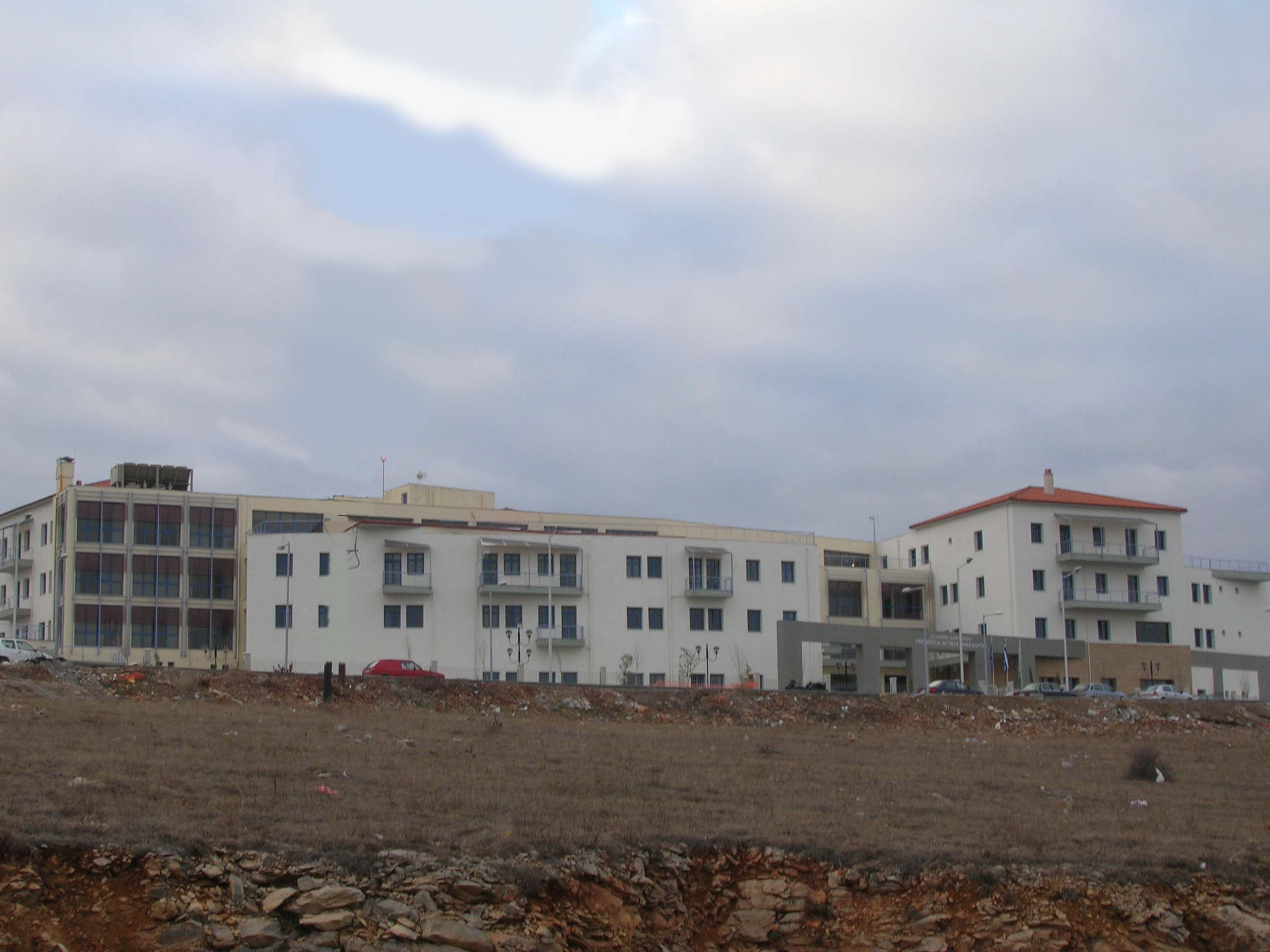
The administrative building of Western Macedonia region in Kozani

The population of Western Macedonia was 283,689 according to the 2011 Greek census. Today, the region is predominantly ethnic Greek with Slavophone Greeks being a minority. The former are mainly concentrated in the towns Florina, Kastoria and Ptolemaida. There are also a smaller number of Slavophones who profess an ethnic Macedonian identity. Other smaller communities include Aromanians and Arvanites.

The region has shrunk by 28,633 people between 2011 and 2021, experiencing a highest percentage population loss in Greece of 10.1%.

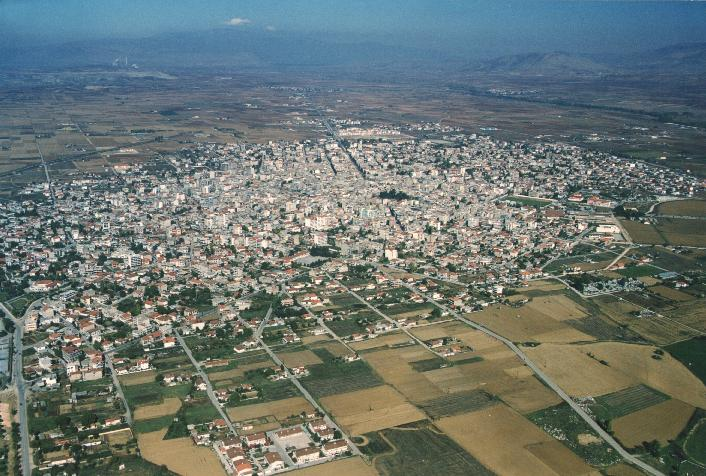
Ptolemaida.

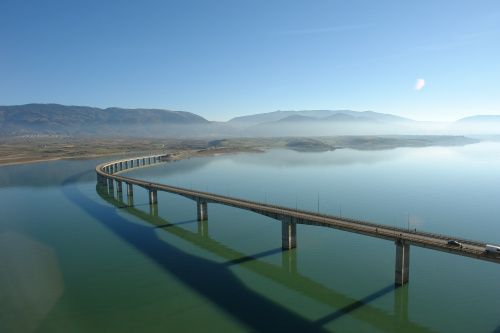
The bridge over the Polyfytos artificial lake of the river Aliakmonas at Servia.

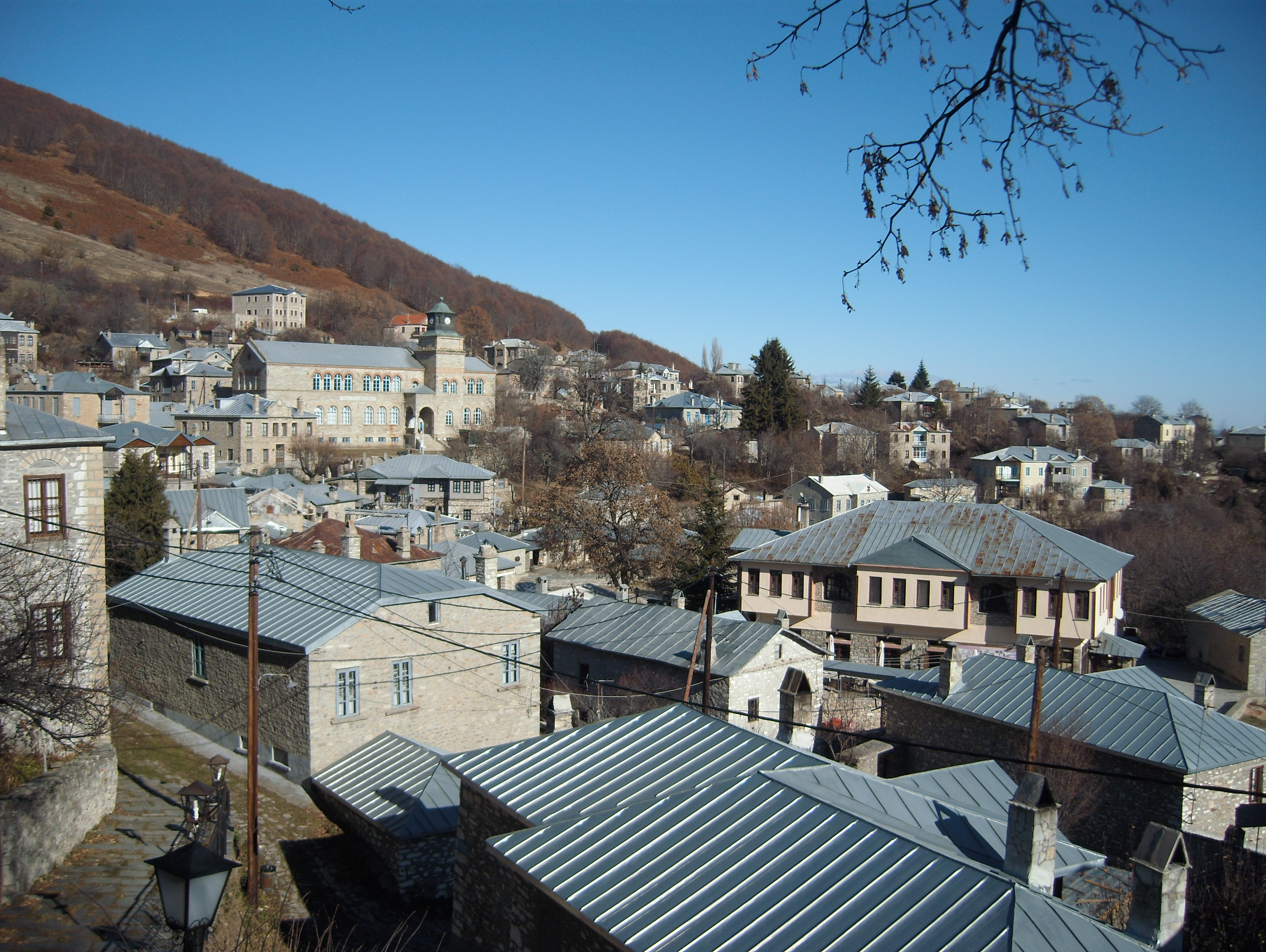
The village of Nymfaio in Florina Prefecture.

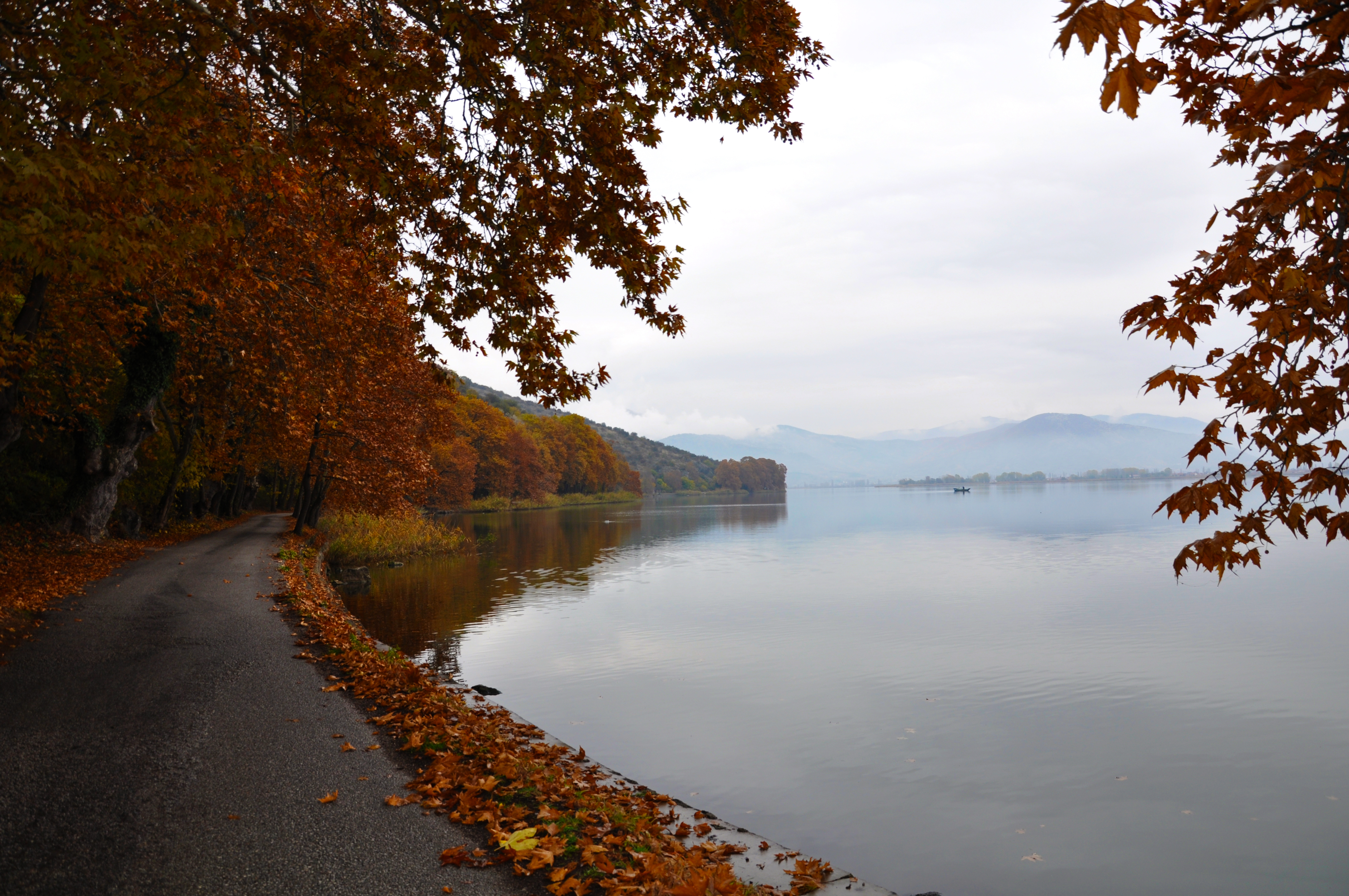
The lake Orestiada in Kastoria.

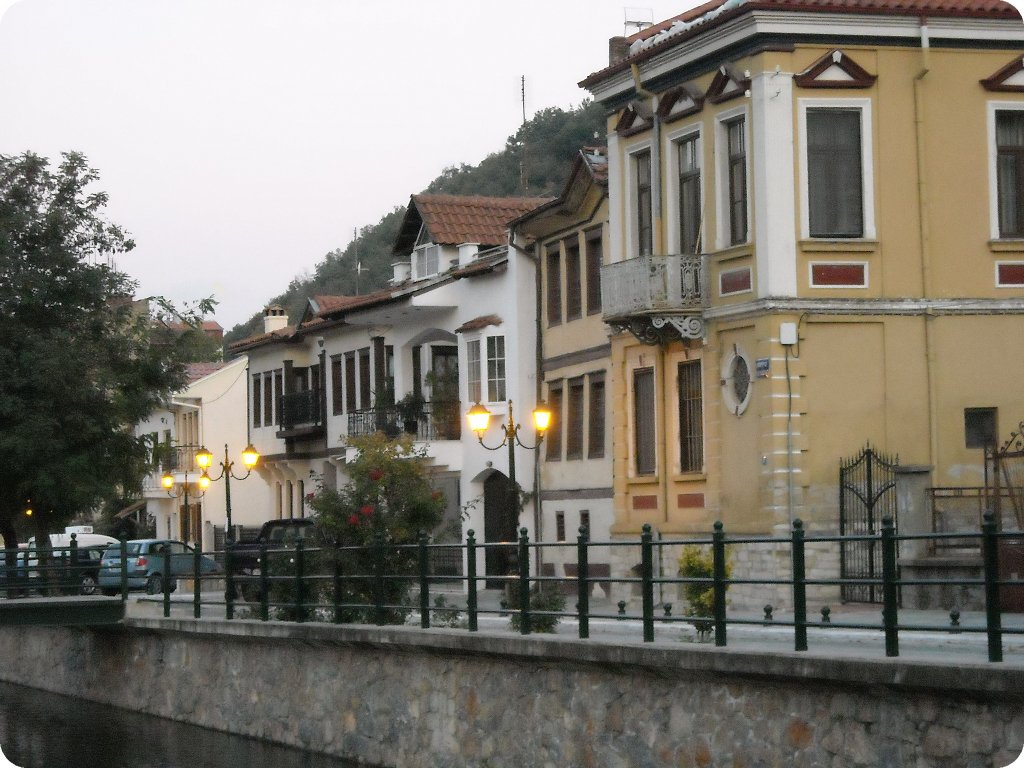
Neoclassical houses at the shoreline of Sakoulevas river, Florina.

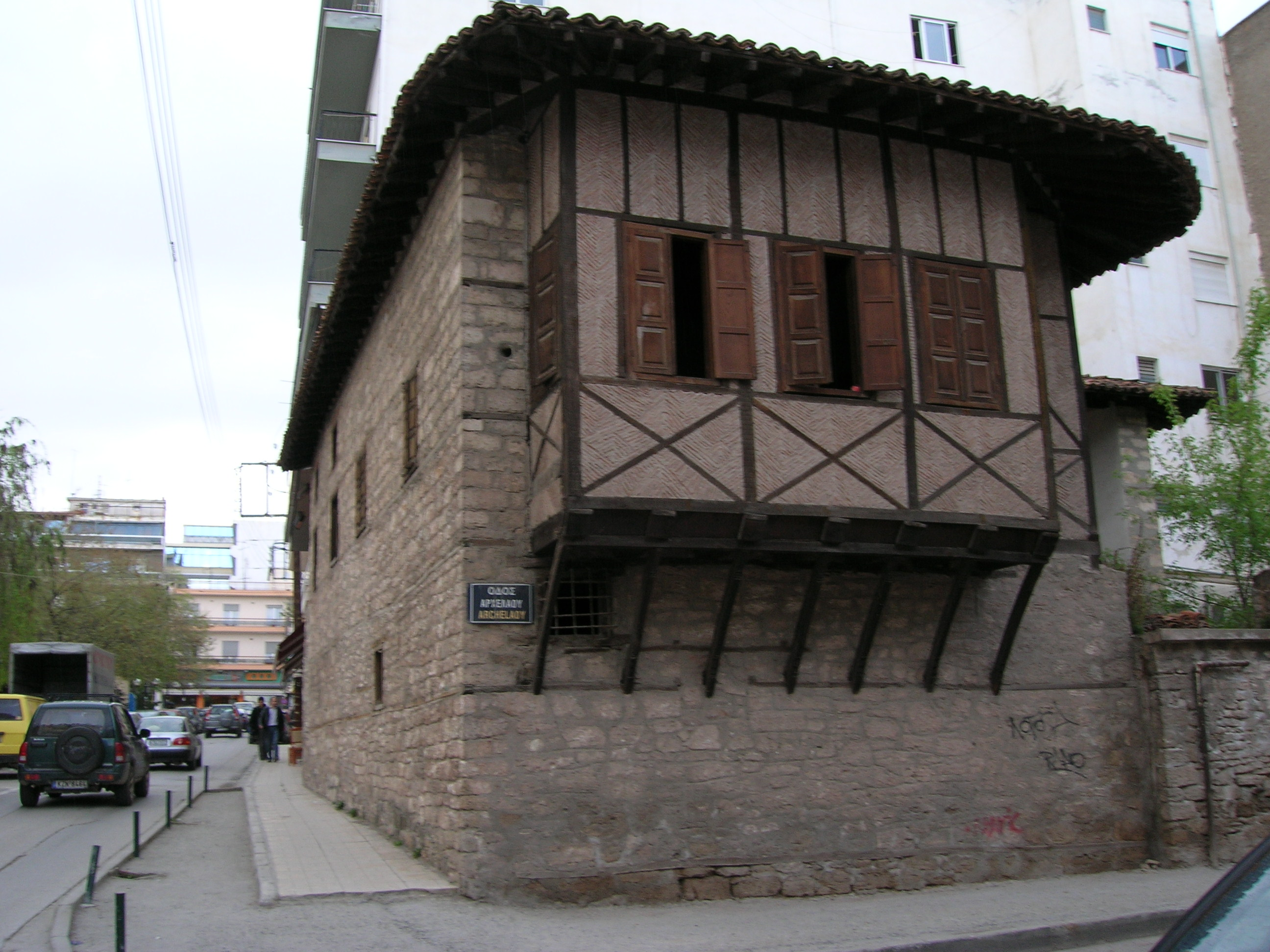
Georgios Lassanis mansion in Kozani.

The biggest towns in each regional unit, according to the census of 2011 (only communities with population more than 2,000 recorded):

	Regional unit	Capital	Area (km^{2})	Population
	Grevena	Grevena	2,291	31,757
1	Grevena			13,374
2	Deskati			3,598
	Kastoria	Kastoria	1,720	50,322
1	Kastoria			16,958
2	Argos Orestiko			7,482
3	Maniakoi			3,055
4	Mesopotamia			2,955
	Kozani	Kozani	3,516	150,196
1	Kozani			42,604
2	Ptolemaida			32,142
3	Siatista			5,490
4	Servia			3,540
5	Velventos			3,399
6	Krokos			2,977
7	Neapoli			2,323
8	Aiani			2,006
	Florina	Florina	1,924	51,414
1	Florina			17,907
2	Amyntaio			4,306
Total	Western Macedonia	Kozani	9,451	283,689

== Major cities and towns ==
- Amyntaio
- Argos Orestiko
- Deskati
- Florina
- Grevena
- Kastoria
- Kozani
- Ptolemaida
- Servia
- Siatista

== Education ==
The University of Western Macedonia provides technical education to stimulate growth throughout the region, and is located in Kozani, Florina and Kastoria. Programs at the university in Florina include courses of study in the Pedagogic Department and the Department of Balkan studies.

The Technological Educational Institute of Western Macedonia (TEIWM) provides undergraduate degrees in Engineering, Business and Finance, Agriculture, Health and Welfare. Based in Kozani, it operates satellite campuses in Kastoria, Florina, Grevena and Ptolemaida.

== Media ==
=== Television channels ===
- West Channel - Kozani
- Top Channel - Kozani
- Kanali 28 - Grevena
- TRM - Grevena
- Flash TV - Kastoria/Kozani
- Dyktio1 - Kastoria

== Gallery ==
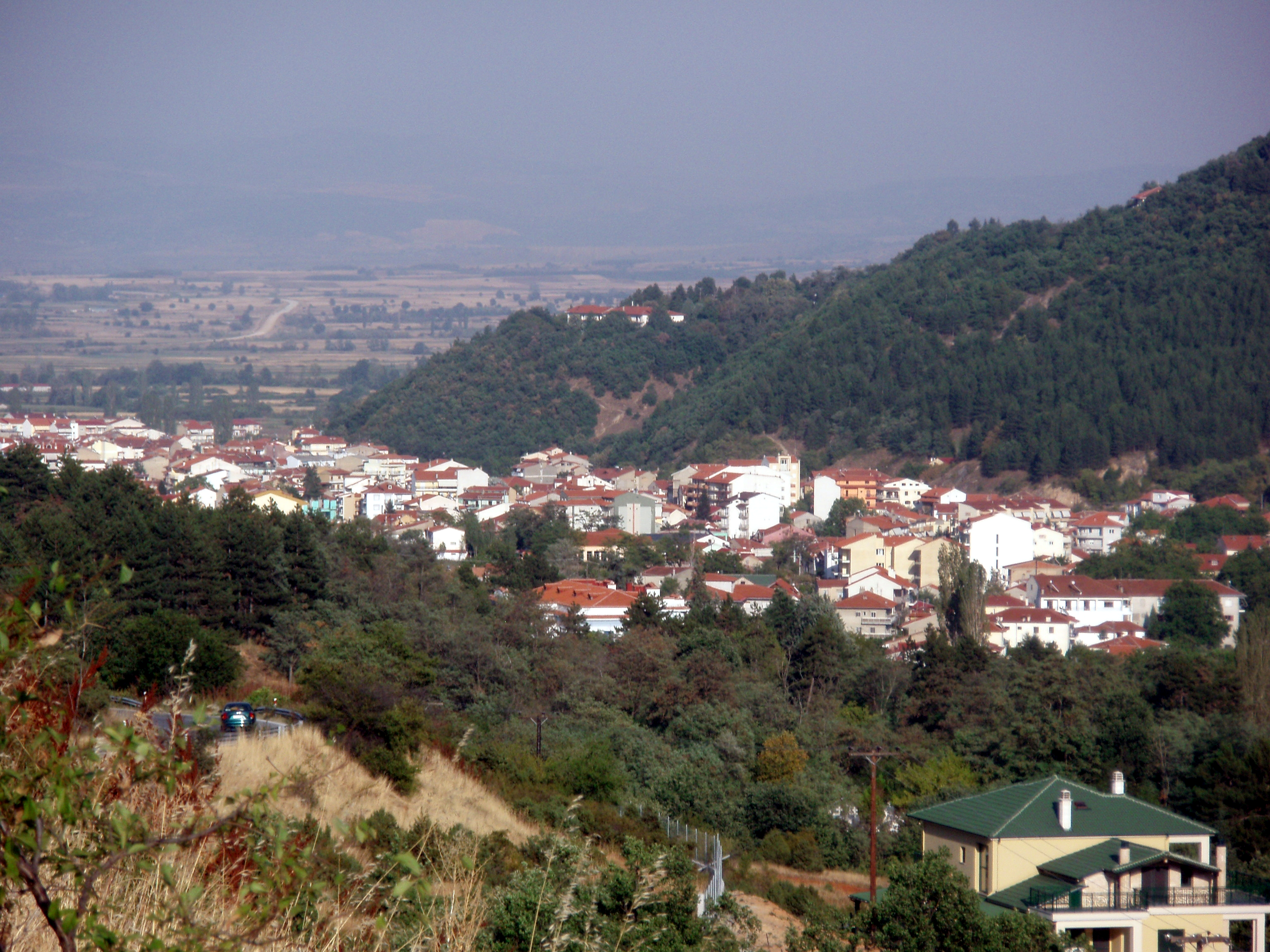
Florina

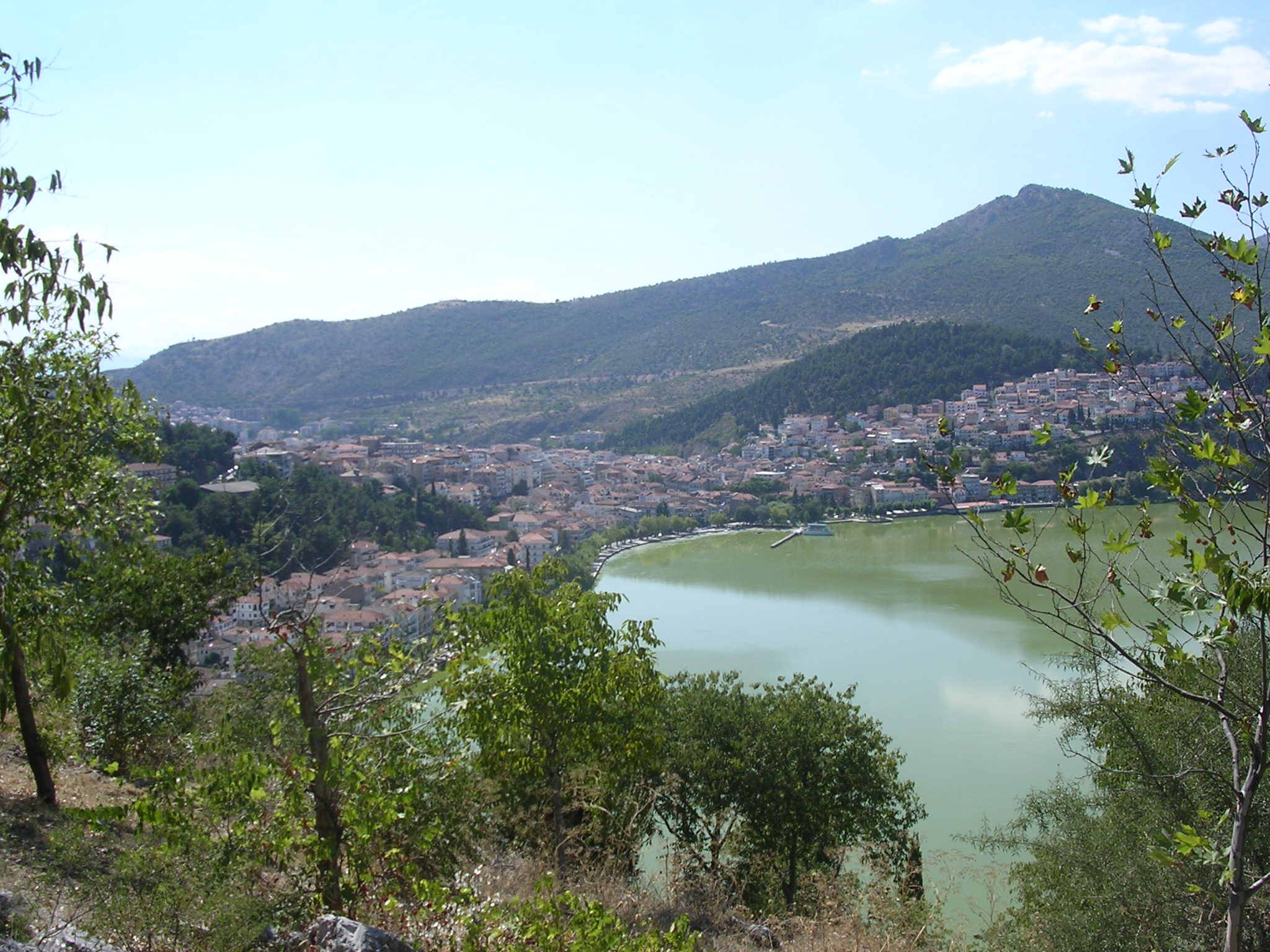
Kastoria

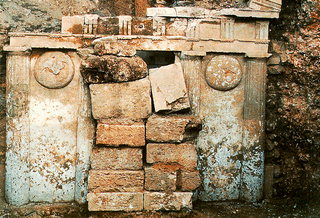
Ancient Macedonian grave in Eordaia

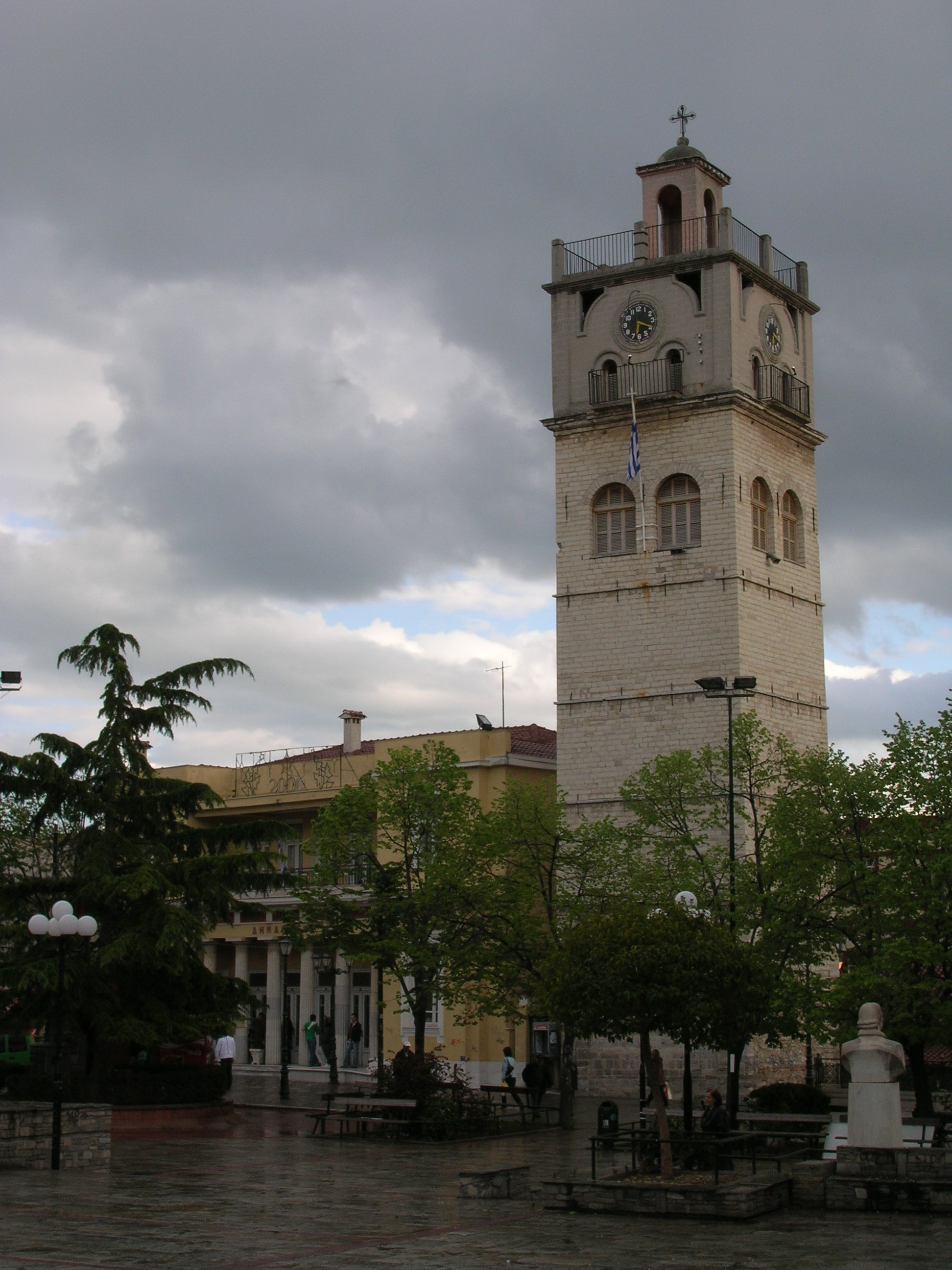
Aghios Nikolaos Clock Tower in Kozani

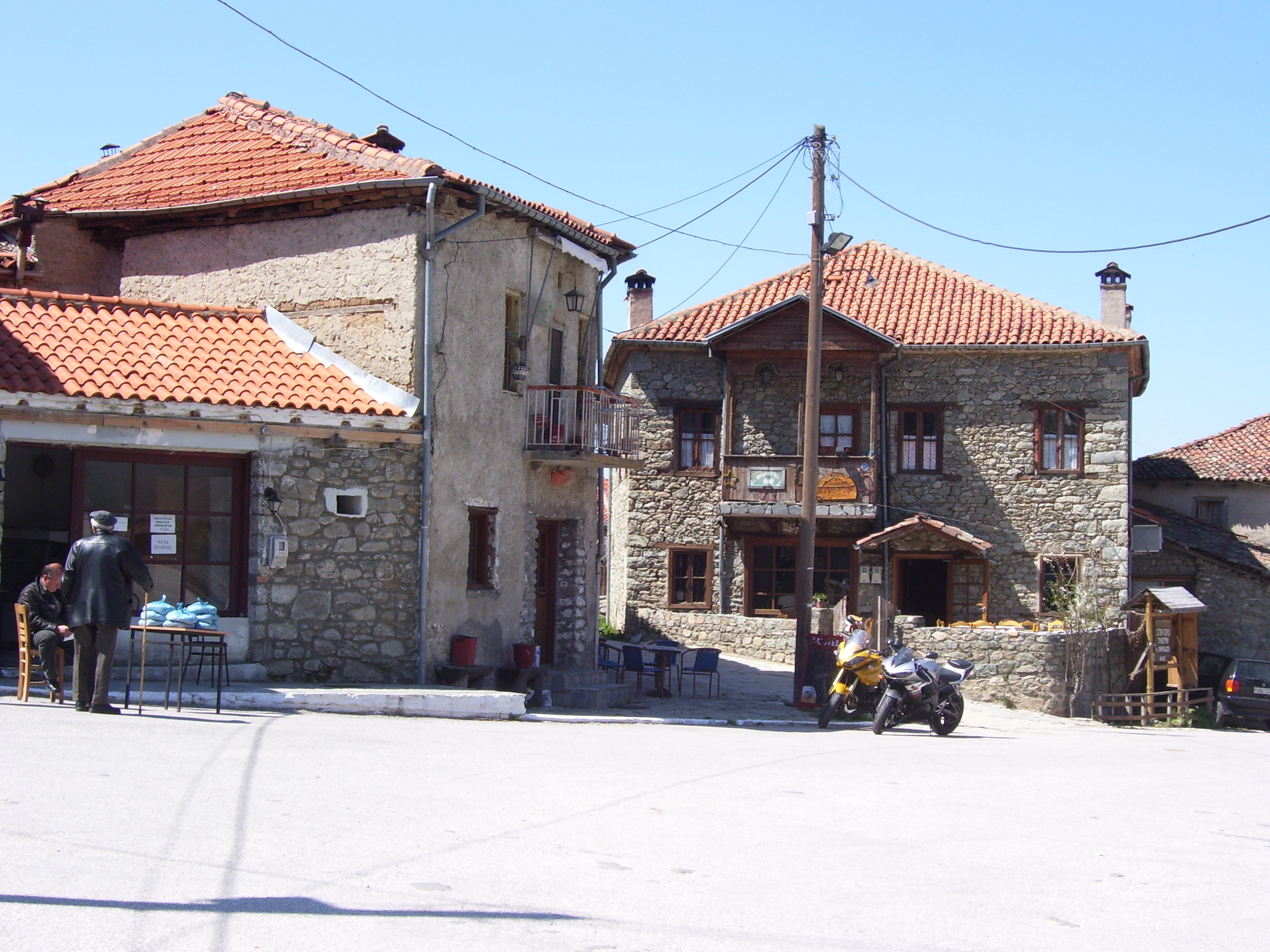
Village of Agios Germanos-Prespa

Vigla: Pissoderi ski resort in Florina

Bouharia geological formations in the Grevena-Kozani geopark at the village of Mikrovalto, Servia.

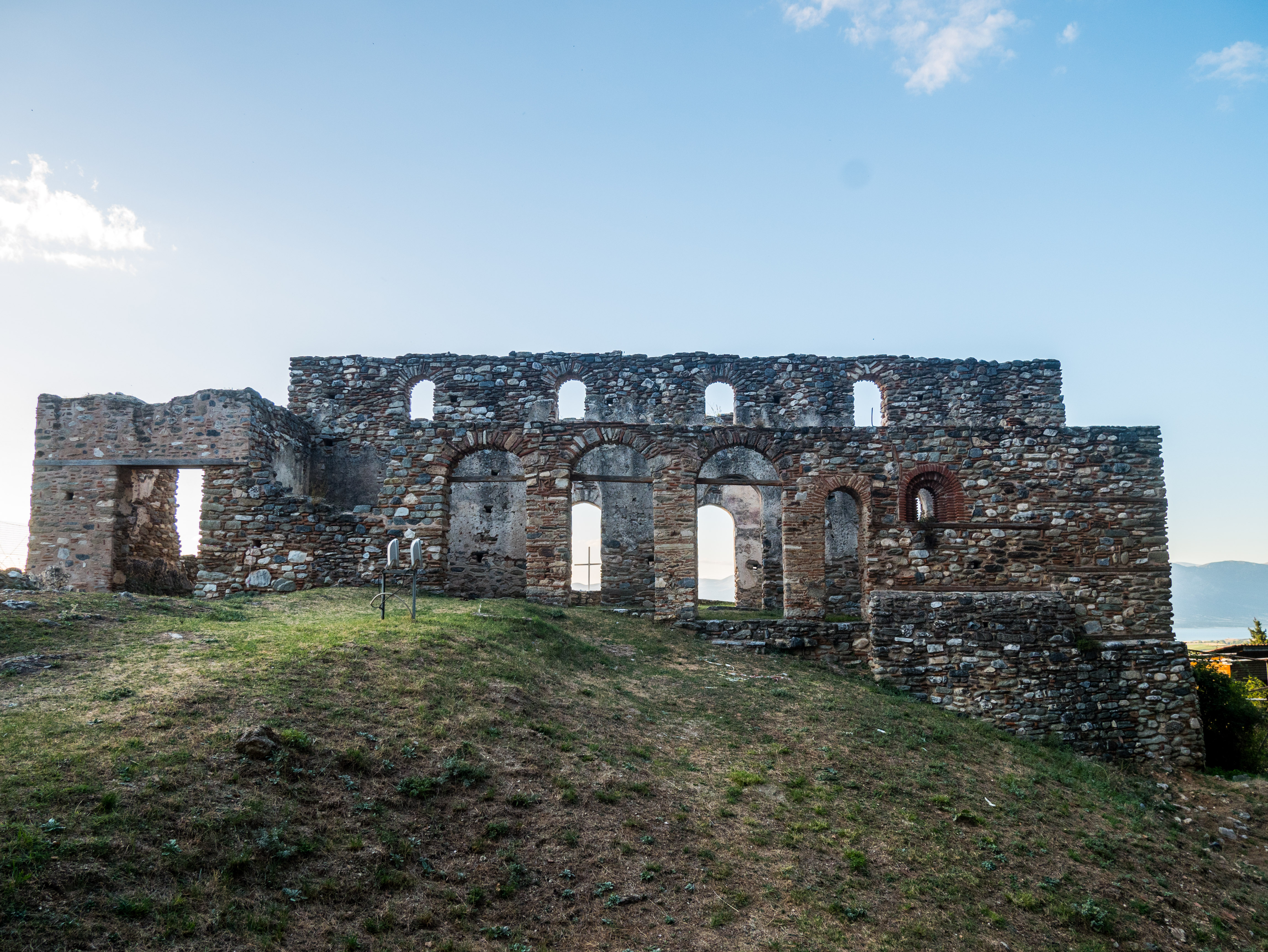
The remains of St Demetrios cathedral at the Byzantine castle of Servia.
