= Gligor Zisov =

Gligor Zisov (Bulgarian: Глигор Зисов) was a Bulgarian teacher in the kaza of Kastoria (present-day Kastoria, Greece) of the Ottoman Empire. He was killed by the newly established Greek authorities in 1913 after the First Balkan War.

== Biography ==
Zisov was born in the nearby village of Aposkep (present-day Aposkepos, Greece). Having graduated from the Bulgarian Men's High School of Thessaloniki, he became the schoolteacher of the village of Tseresnitsa (today Polikeraso), in 1912. A student of his recalled:

"He was medium-height, neither particularly tall nor short. Wherever he went, the ground grew more beautiful; he was just like a teacher..."

After the establishing of the Greek authorities in the region of Kastoria, a militia group of Evzones installed in the village of Tseresnitsa. Greek soldiers however, tried to convince him to become a teacher of the Greek language but he refused, saying that Bulgaria and Greece were allies, as they were member-states of the Balkan League. After refusing repeatedly to become a Greek teacher, he was severely beaten in front of his students.

Consequently, Zisov's father took him back to his home village; however, Zisov was soon after arrested by Greeks, bound, and led back to Tseresnitsa.

On the eve of the Second Balkan War, some Bulgarian priests and teachers of the Kastoria region, were subjected to deportation to Bulgaria. A number of them were arrested, beaten, put in prison, even killed. One of them, according to interviews taken from the Bulgarian dialectologist and phonologist Blagoy Shklifov, was Zisov, who was taken to Bulgaria. When the group of Bulgarian teachers and priests were near Zagoritsani (present-day Vasiliada, Greece), the Greek soldiers killed them.
