= Metamorfosi, Kastoria =

Metamorfosi
- Community
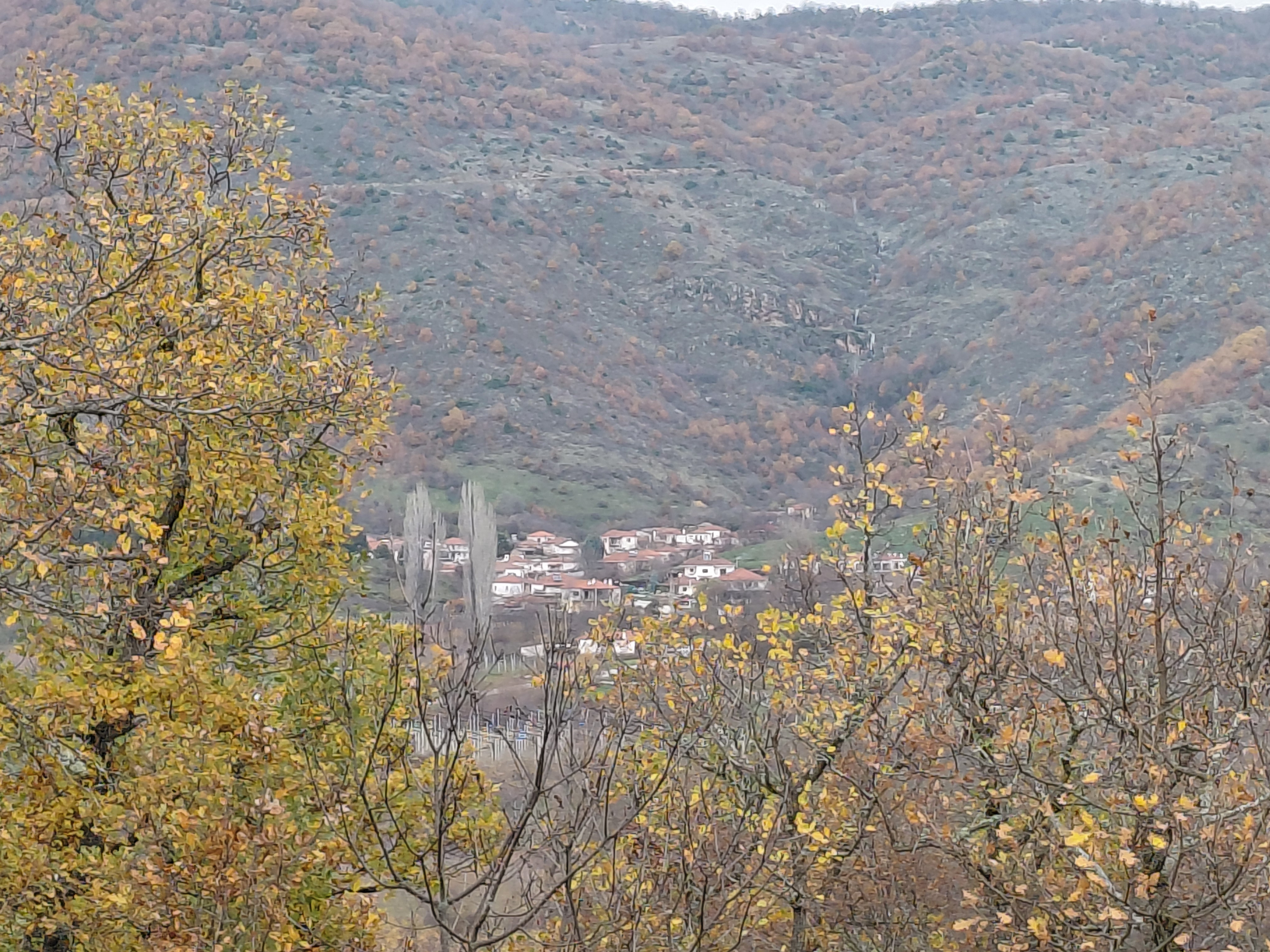
- Metamorfosi, Kastoria

- Location within Greece
- Country: Greece
- Geographic region: Macedonia
- Administrative region: Western Macedonia
- Regional unit: Kastoria
- Municipality: Kastoria
- Municipal unit: Vitsi

Population (2021)
  - Community: 274
- Time zone: UTC+2 (EET)
  - Summer (DST): UTC+3 (EEST)

Metamorfosi (Greek: Μεταμόρφωση, before 1950: Κοντορρόπη – Kontorropi) is a village and a community in Kastoria Regional Unit, Macedonia, Greece. The community consists of the villages Metamorfosi and Foteini.

In 1945, Greek Foreign Minister Ioannis Politis ordered the compilation of demographic data regarding the Prefecture of Kastoria. The village Metamorfosi had a total of 341 inhabitants, and was populated by 300 Slavophones without a Bulgarian national consciousness. The population speaks the Popole variant of the Kostur dialect.
