= Sidirochori =

Sidirochori Σιδηροχώρι
- Village
- View of Sidirochori

- Location within Greece
- Country: Greece
- Region: Western Macedonia
- Regional Unit: Kastoria Regional Unit
- Municipality: Kastoria
- Elevation: 1,040 m (3,410 ft)

Population (2021)
  - Total: 92
- Time zone: UTC+2 (EET)
  - Summer (DST): UTC+3 (EEST)

Sidirochori (Greek: Σιδηροχώρι; Bulgarian and Macedonian: Шестеово) is a village and a community in Kastoria Regional Unit, Greece. In the 2021 census, it had a population of 92.

== History ==
According to a legend, the village was founded by herders from the Bitola region and from Polykeraso seeking security from violence after the arrival of the Turks.

Per Alexandre Synvet, Sistova had 600 Greeks in 1878.

In Ethnographie des vilayets d'Andrinople: de Monastir, et de Salonique, which was published in 1878, Testéovo had 80 households and had a population of 400 Bulgarians.

In 1900, Vasil Kanchov documented 890 Bulgarian Christians in the village.

In 1905, Dimitar Mishev, who was the Secretary of the Bulgarian Exarchate, recorded (Note: Mishev was writing as "Brancoff") 544 Bulgarian Exarchists and 496 Bulgarian Patriarchists in Chestovo, with a total population of 1,040. Per him, the village had one Bulgarian primary school, one Bulgarian teacher, and 53 Bulgarian students, while it also had one Greek primary school, one Greek teacher, and six Greek students.

In November 1903, Bulgarian bishop Grigoriy of Pelagonia, accompanied by Naum Temchev, Tarpo Popovski, Grigoriy Beydov, chairman of the Bulgarian community in Kastoria, arrived in the village and distributed aid to the residents affected by the supression of the Ilinden Uprising. Metropolitan Bishop of Kastoria Germanos Karavangelis protested, claiming Shesteovo was a Greek village, but a village delegation near Kastoria resolved the dispute, allowing the distribution to proceed. According to Naum Temchev, 30 of the village's 120 houses had been burned down, while the remaining houses were looted.

In 1928, the village's name was changed from Σίτσεβον (Sítsevon) to Σιδηροχώρι (Sidirochóri).

In 1945, Greek Foreign Minister Ioannis Politis ordered the compilation demographic data regarding the Prefecture of Kastoria. The village Sidirochori had a total of 550 inhabitants, all Slavophones with a Bulgarian national consciousness.

== Geography ==
The village is located 10 km (6.2 mi) north of Kastoria and 5 km (3.1 mi) away from Lake of Kastoria on the southern foothills of Mount Verno in the Popoli region. It has an elevation of 1,040 m.

== Economy ==
The village's main economic branch is animal husbandry and to some level agriculture.

== Demographics ==
The population of the village from 1913 and the following years is as follows: (Note: Numbers in parentheses are the de facto population, while those next to the parentheses are the de jure population.)

Year	Population		
Year	Male	Female	Total
1913	269	333	602
1920	218	355	573
1928	253	375	628
1940	275	334	609
1951	324 (315)		
1961	207 (190)		
1971	181 (162)		
1981	206 (182)		
1991	(155)		
2001	(125)		
2011	–		
2021	–		

== Notable people ==
- Lyubka Rondova, Bulgarian folk singer
