= Blagoy Shklifov =

Bulgarian linguist (1935–2003)

- Born: January 30, 1935; Polykeraso, Kastoria, Greece
- Died: September 25, 2003 (aged 68); Serres, Greece
- Scientific career
- Fields: Linguistics, dialectology

Blagoy Stefanov Shklifov (Bulgarian: Благой Стефанов Шклифов; January 30, 1935 – September 25, 2003) was a Bulgarian dialectologist and phonologist.

== Life ==
Shklifov was born in Polykeraso (Chereshnitsa), Vitsi municipality (now Kastoria municipality), Kastoria regional unit, Greece in 1935. In 1948, at the end of the Greek Civil War, he left his burned village and after a short stay in SFR Yugoslavia went to Hungary, with many refugees from Greek Macedonia. In 1964, he went to Bulgaria and studied at Sofia University "St. Clement of Ohrid". He was a lecturer at the University of Szeged, Hungary and at Sofia University, Bulgaria.

In his books, he claimed that the Slavophones of Greek Macedonia are ethnic Bulgarians. For this reason, he was not permitted to enter Greece for 40 years. He died in September 2003 in a car crash during a field work trip in Greece. Some of his colleagues suspect he was murdered.

== Work ==
Shklifov specialised on Bulgarian dialectology, especially the phonetics of South-West Bulgarian (Macedonian) dialects and their connection with Old Bulgarian. Considering these dialects in comparative plan with Old Bulgarian he explained the development of many sounds, for example ѫ, not with external influences, but with internal processes in the language.

Shklifov regarded the western Slavic dialects of Greece as a part of the Bulgarian dialect area.
