= Oxya, Kastoria =

Oxya
- Community
- Location within Greece
- Coordinates: 40°36′37″N 21°20′54″E
- Country: Greece
- Geographic region: Macedonia
- Administrative region: Western Macedonia
- Regional unit: Kastoria
- Municipality: Kastoria
- Municipal unit: Vitsi

Population (2021)
  - Community: 59
- Time zone: UTC+2 (EET)
  - Summer (DST): UTC+3 (EEST)

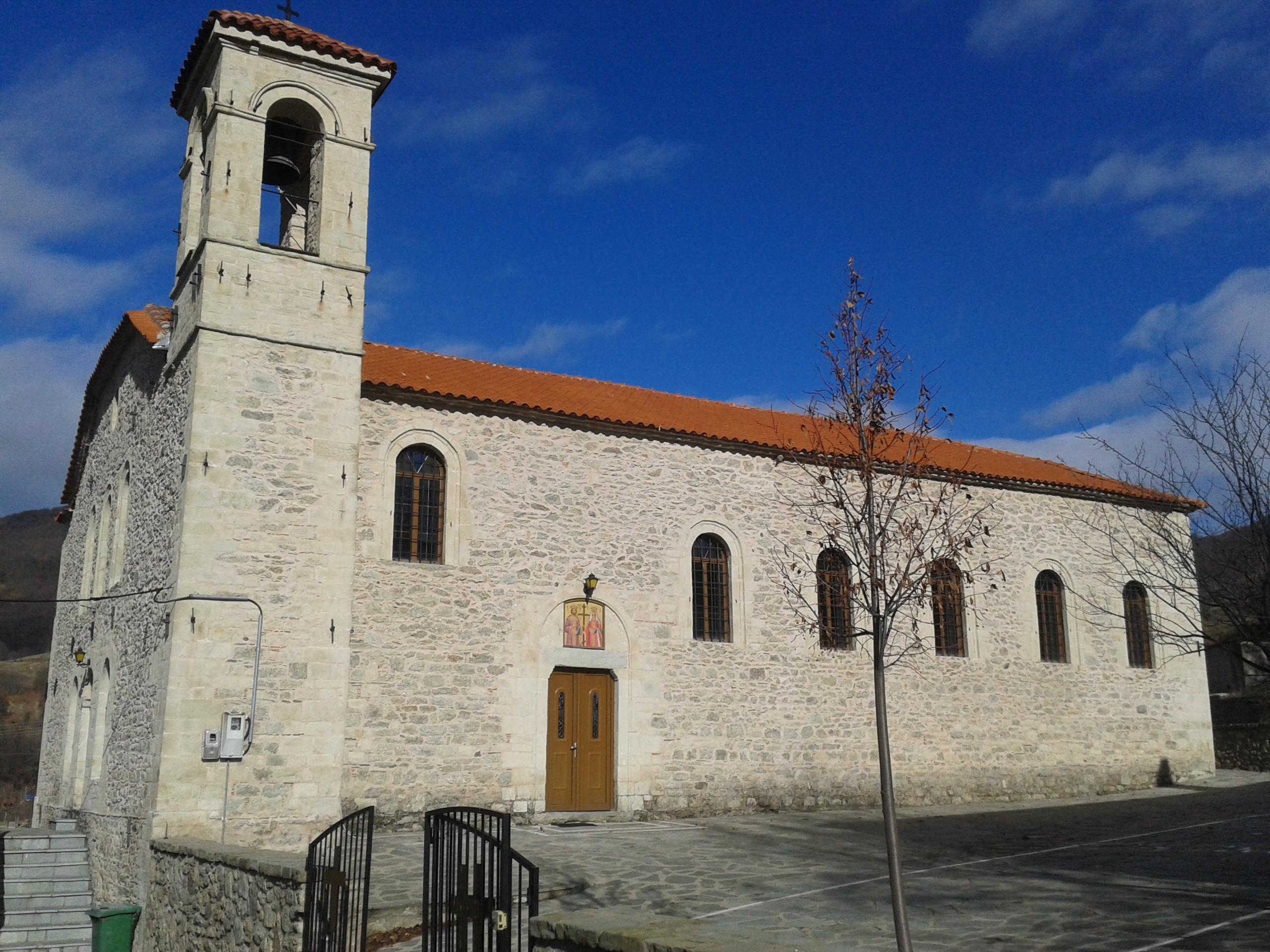
Church in Oxya, Kastoria Prefecture

Oxya (Greek: Οξυά, before 1927: Μπλάτση – Blatsi) is a village and a community in Kastoria Regional Unit, Macedonia, Greece.

In 1945, Greek Foreign Minister Ioannis Politis ordered the compilation of demographic data regarding the Prefecture of Kastoria. The village Oxya had a total of 265 inhabitants, and was populated by 245 Slavophones with a Macedonian national consciousness.
