= Lyubka Rondova =

Lyubka Rondova Любка Рондова
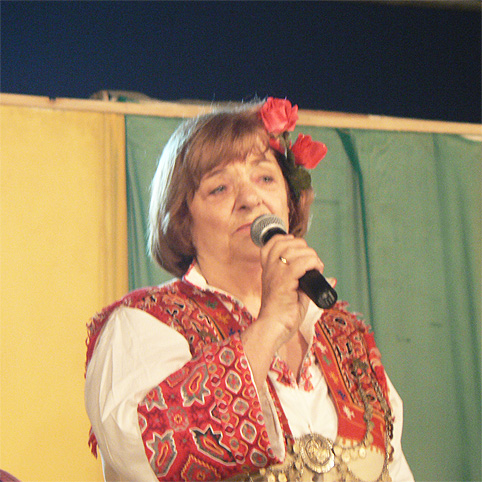

Background information
- Born: September 24, 1936; Sidirochori, Greece
- Died: March 15, 2016 (aged 79) Sofia, Bulgaria
- Genres: Folk

Lyubka Vasileva Rondova (Bulgarian: Любка Василева Рондова), Ljubka Rondova or Lubka Rondova was a Bulgarian folk singer best known for performing and recording many of the traditional songs from Macedonia as a folklore region.

Rondova was born in Sidirochori (Bulgarian: Шестеово, Shesteovo), Vitsi municipality (now Kastoria municipality), Kastoria Prefecture, Greece in 1936. In 1948, at the end of the Greek Civil War, she left her village and went to Poland with many children-refugees from the western part of Greek Macedonia. Later she moved to Czechoslovakia and graduated in Slavistics from Charles University in Prague. Rondova and her family settled in Bulgaria in 1960.

Rondova was invited to join the song and dance ensemble "Gotse Delchev" in Sofia and was its soloist 30 years.

She was awarded the highest Bulgarian order Stara Planina, First Degree in 2002. She died on March 15, 2016.
