= Stojan Kočov =

Macedonian historian (1930–2023)

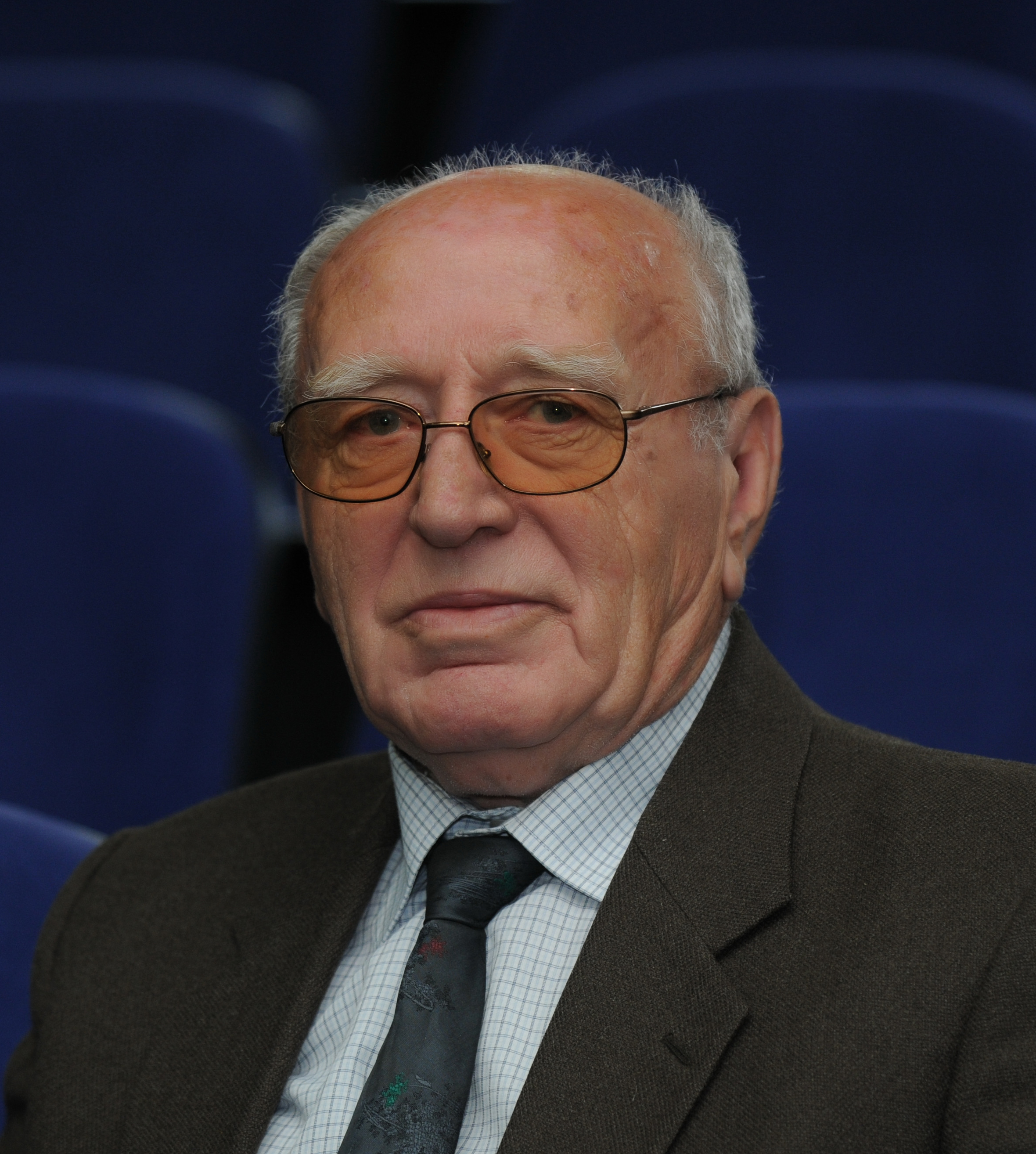
- Born: 25 December 1930; Koryfi, Florina, Greece
- Died: 5 January 2023 (aged 92); Skopje, North Macedonia
- Occupation(s): Historian, publicist.

Stojan Kočov (Macedonian: Стојан Кочов; 25 December 1930 – 5 January 2023) was a Macedonian historian, scientist and publisher. From 1946 to 1949 he fought as a partisan in Democratic Army of Greece during Greek Civil War and also participated in the ethnic Macedonian communist organizations in northern Greece (NOF). After the defeat of the communists in the Civil War, Kočov fled to the Soviet Union where he lived and studied from 1950 to 1957. In 1957 he emigrated to SFR Yugoslavia. Stojan Kočov was one of the most active researchers of the participation of the Slavic Macedonians in the Greek Civil War and has published many books related to the subject. Kočov died on 5 January 2023, at the age of 92.

== Works ==
- Идеолошкиот активизам над Македонците под Грција (The ideological activism of Macedonians in Greece)
- Ѓорѓи Пејков - Македонскиот воин низ историјата на ДАГ (1945–1949) (George Pejkov - The Macedonian warrior throughout the history of DAG (1945-1949))
- Мртвото лице на војната (The death face of war)
- Средба (Meeting)
- Една мртва војска (One dead army)
