= Aposkepos =

- Settlement
- Location within Greece
- Coordinates: 40°33′33.4″N 21°15′03.64″E
- Country: Greece
- Geographic region: Macedonia
- Administrative region: Western Macedonia
- Regional unit: Kastoria
- Municipality: Kastoria
- Municipal unit: Kastoria
- Community: Kastoria

Population (2021)
  - Total: 165
- Time zone: UTC+2 (EET)
  - Summer (DST): UTC+3 (EEST)

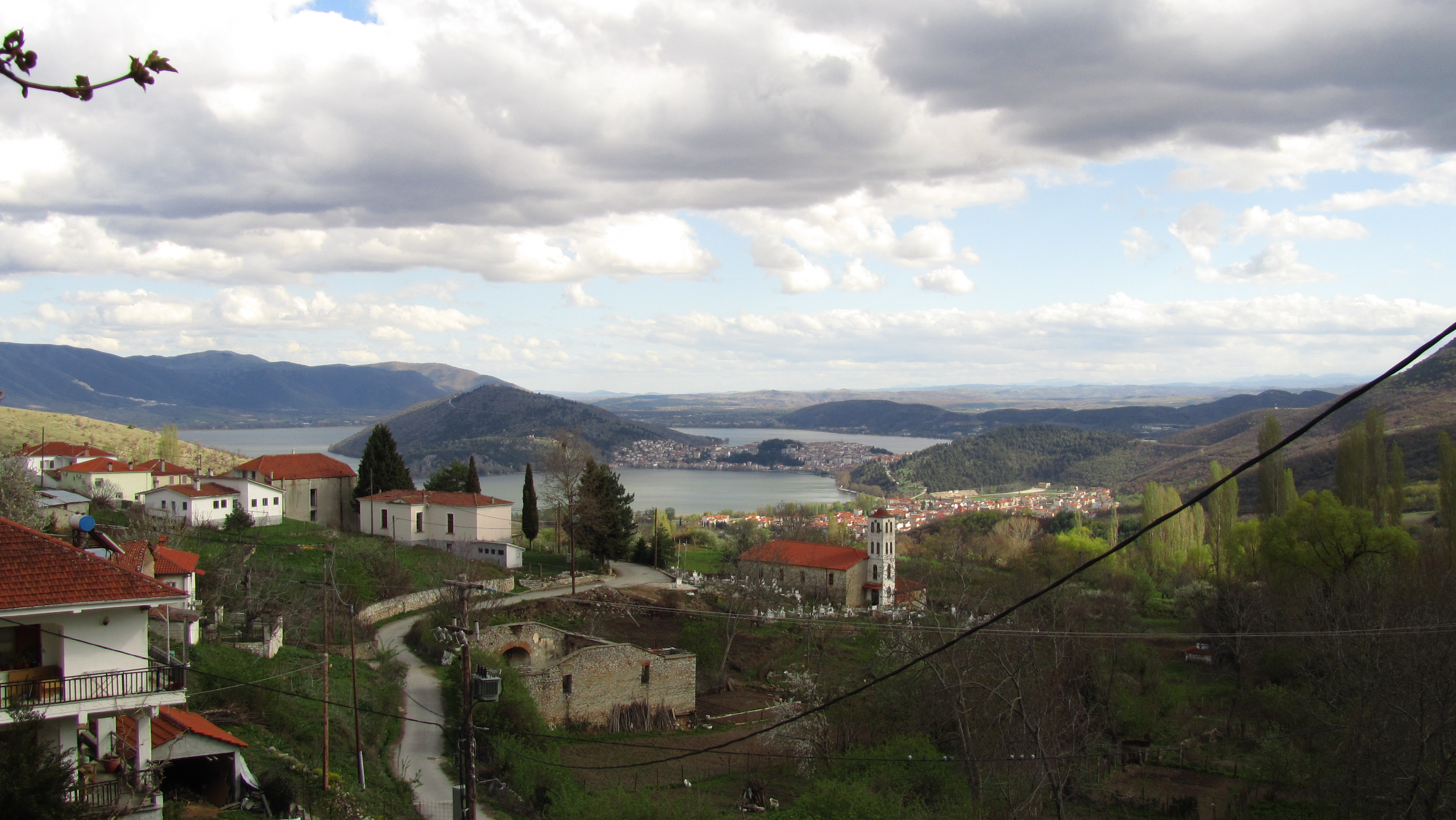

Aposkepos (Greek: Απόσκεπος) is a village in Kastoria Regional Unit, Macedonia, Greece. It is part of the community of Kastoria.

In 1945, Greek Foreign Minister Ioannis Politis ordered the compilation of demographic data regarding the Prefecture of Kastoria. The village Aposkepos had a total of 379 inhabitants, and was populated by 340 Slavophones with an ethnic Macedonian national consciousness. The inhabitants speak the Dolna Koreshcha variant of the Kostur dialect.
