= Foteini, Kastoria =

Foteini
- Settlement
- Location within Greece
- Coordinates: 40°32′29″N 21°20′28″E
- Country: Greece
- Geographic region: Macedonia
- Administrative region: Western Macedonia
- Regional unit: Kastoria
- Municipality: Kastoria
- Municipal unit: Vitsi
- Community: Metamorfosi

Population (2021)
  - Total: 152
- Time zone: UTC+2 (EET)
  - Summer (DST): UTC+3 (EEST)

Foteini (Greek: Φωτεινή, before 1926: Φωτίνιστα – Fotinista) is a village in Kastoria Regional Unit, Macedonia, Greece. It is part of the community of Metamorfosi.

The 1920 Greek census recorded 29 people in the village. Following the Greek–Turkish population exchange, Greek refugee families in Fotinista were from Pontus (34) in 1926. The 1928 Greek census recorded 119 village inhabitants. In 1928, the refugee families numbered 34 (94 people) in 1928.
