= Vitsi =

Vitsi Βίτσι
- Municipal unit
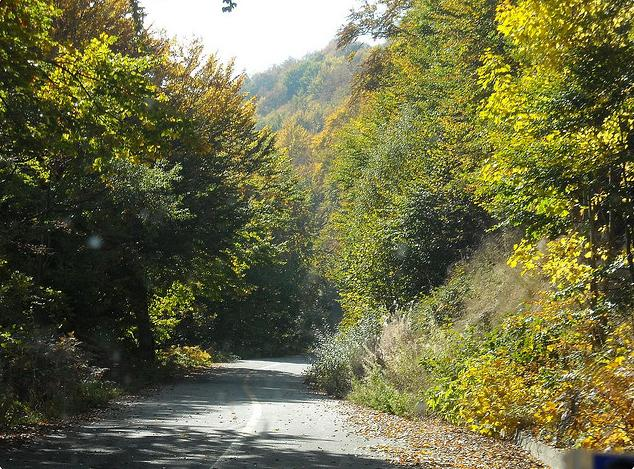
- National Road through Vitsi (Verno) Mountain

- Location within the regional unit

- Location within Greece
- Coordinates: 40°35′N 21°18′E
- Country: Greece
- Administrative region: West Macedonia
- Regional unit: Kastoria
- Municipality: Kastoria

Area
  - Municipal unit: 135.0 km^{2} (52.1 sq mi)

Population (2021)
  - Municipal unit: 1,145
  - Municipal unit density: 8.481/km^{2} (21.97/sq mi)
- Time zone: UTC+2 (EET)
  - Summer (DST): UTC+3 (EEST)
- Vehicle registration: KT

Vitsi (Greek: Βίτσι) is a former municipality in Kastoria regional unit, West Macedonia, Greece. Since the 2011 local government reform, it has been part of the municipality of Kastoria, of which it is a municipal unit. It takes its name from Mount Vitsi which is the highest point within the municipal unit. The municipal unit has an area of 135.028 km^{2}. The population is 1,145 (2021). It includes the villages of Sidirochori (Σιδηροχώρι), Foteini (Φωτεινή), Metamorfosi (Μεταμόρφωση), Toichio (Τοιχιό), Vyssinia (Βυσσινιά), Oxya (Οξυά), Polykerasos (Πολυκέρασος) and Poimeniko (Ποιμενικό). The village of Poimeniko has no permanent residents anymore. The seat of the municipality was in Toichio.
