= Nikodim Tsarknias =

Greek Macedonian Orthodox Christian monk

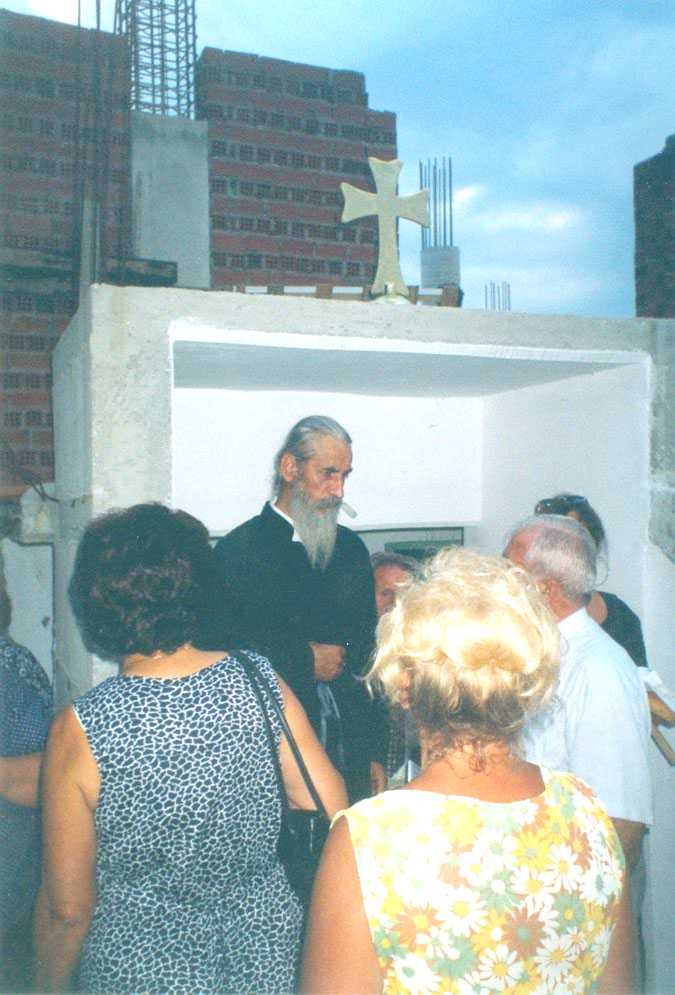
Nikodim Tsarknias

Nikodim Tsarknias (Greek: Νικόδημος Τσαρκνιάς, Macedonian: Никодим Царкњас, born 1942 in Aridaia) is a Greek Macedonian Orthodox Christian monk and archimandrite. In 1973 he was an ordained as a member of the Church of Greece, but was expelled for misconduct in 1991.

The reasons for his expulsion are disputed. The Church of Greece accused him of serious ethical misconduct, and after a decision of the Holy Synod he was brought to ecclesiastical justice. He was found guilty by both the first-instance court and the ecclesiastical court of appeals, and he was then dismissed on March 11, 1992.

According to Tsarknias and ethnic Macedonian sources, when he was a personal secretary to the Florina diocese's bishop, he opposed what he saw as an attempt by the Bishop to eradicate ethnic Macedonian religious customs. It is argued that, in 1991, after declaring his Macedonian identity and communicating with parishioners in Macedonian he was dismissed from his ecclesiastical post in the diocese of Florina; the Church of Greece argues, however, that Tsarknias declared his Macedonian identity only after the questionable accusations for ethical and sexual misconduct (homosexuality).

He has claimed that he has been harassed due to his ethnic Macedonian identity. He has been the subject of numerous court cases, one of them over the attempted establishment of a Macedonian church in Aridaia. He was sentenced in May 2004 to three months in prison on the charges of "establishing and operating a church without authorization".

In 2009 he was sentenced to six months in prison for beating a 12-year-old in 2002. The boy allegedly vandalized Tsarknias' home with eggs and stones. Tsarknias restrained the child and brought him to the local police station after the child refused to give the names of his parents, but Tsarknias was subsequently charged for assault. Tsarknias accepted that he "managed to grab the child by his arm", saying that he "didn't hurt the child" and that the judge was harsh on him, stating "the main judge did not let us prove that I did not hurt the child because she wanted to sentence me as soon as she could" and that he was charged out of revenge for campaigning for the rights of the ethnic Macedonian minority in Greece (whose existence is officially denied by the Greek state).
