= Polykeraso =

- Community
- Location within Greece
- Country: Greece
- Geographic region: Macedonia
- Administrative region: Western Macedonia
- Regional unit: Kastoria
- Municipality: Kastoria
- Municipal unit: Vitsi

Population (2021)
  - Community: 8
- Time zone: UTC+2 (EET)
  - Summer (DST): UTC+3 (EEST)

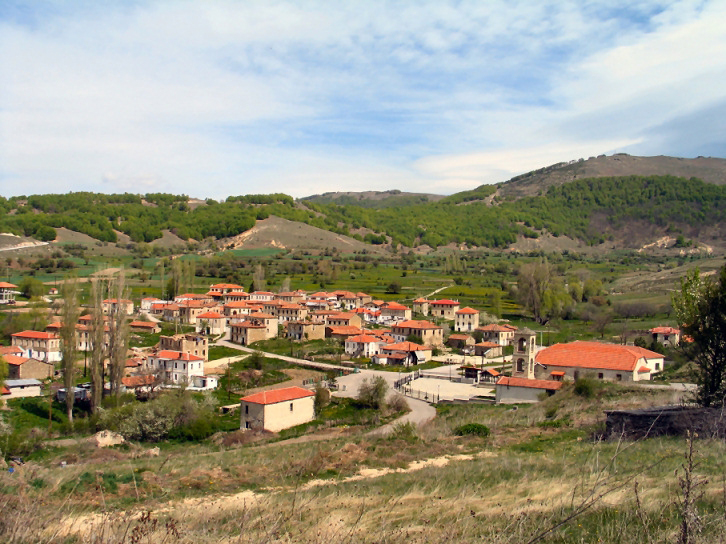
Polykeraso-panorama

Polykeraso (Greek: Πολυκέρασο, before 1926: Τσερέσνιτσα – Chereshnitsa) is a village and a community in Kastoria Regional Unit, Macedonia, Greece.

In 1945, Greek Foreign Minister Ioannis Politis ordered the compilation of demographic data regarding the Prefecture of Kastoria. The village Polykeraso had a total of 452 inhabitants, and was populated by 440 Slavophones with a Macedonian national consciousness. The inhabitants speak the Popole variant of the Kostur dialect.
