= Christo Nizamoff =

American writer

Christo N. Nizamoff
- Born: 2 September 1903; Jankovec, Resen, Ottoman Empire
- Died: 25 May 1989 (aged 85); Indianapolis, Indiana, US
- Education: Sofia University
- Occupations: writer, publicist, journalist
- Spouse: Slavka "Alice" Doucleff
- Children: Nicholas and Virginia
- Writing career
- Notable works: Struggle for Freedom (1985); Macedonian Tribune (1966-1971); Balkania Magazine (1966-1973)

Christo N. Nizamoff (Bulgarian: Христо Николов Низамов) (born 1903, died 1989) was an American writer, journalist and public figure of Macedonian Bulgarian origin. Born in the village of Jankovec, then a part of the Ottoman Empire, he is best remembered as an activist of the Macedonian Patriotic Organization and fifth editor of the newspaper "Macedonian Tribune".

== Life ==
Nizamoff was born on September 2, 1903, in Ottoman Vardar Macedonia. Following the partition of Macedonia in 1913, Nizamoff's birthplace became part of Serbia. He was the son of Maria and Nicholas Nizamoff, both respected members of the community. Nizamoff had two brothers and one sister.

Christo received his early education at the Resen community school, where he completed grades one through eight. He then attended his secondary education in Sofia, Bulgaria. During his summer breaks, Nizamoff worked at a Sofia newspaper known as Novo Vreme.

In 1921, Nizamoff enrolled at the University of Sofia, but was ultimately expelled due to his involvement in a plot against King Boris and the constitutional monarchy. He subsequently returned to his hometown of Resen. However, circumstances did not allow him to remain in Macedonia for long, and he eventually made the decision to illegally immigrate to the United States to escape Serbian oppression.

Upon arriving in the U.S. in 1921 at the age of 18, Nizamoff initially stayed with a friend for a few months in New York before relocating to Putnam, Connecticut to reside with his cousin, Jivko Nizamoff. Nizamoff found his first job in the U.S. at a Putnam cotton mill, where he earned a wage as a loom oiler. He also devoted time to teaching himself the English language. After nine months, in 1922, Nizamoff returned to New York City and secured a position as a night clerk at a prominent apartment-hotel on East 60th Street. In addition, he founded and directed the Macedonian Press Bureau in 1925, during the formative years of the Macedonian Patriotic Organization (MPO), which was founded in Fort Wayne and headquartered in Indianapolis. The Bureau remained operational until his move to Indianapolis in 1930. During this period, Nizamoff wrote articles for Zora, a newspaper based in Sofia. He was an advocate for an independent Macedonia. In 1925, The New York Times printed a response written by Nizamoff to one of their articles that criticized Bulgarian Macedonians. At the request of the MPO leadership, Nizamoff moved to Indianapolis in 1930 on a temporary assignment for the Bulgarian-language weekly Macedonian Tribune. He remained with the paper for 41 years, serving as its editor-in-chief from April 1966 to March 1971.

In 1967 and 1969, Nizamoff was awarded a George Washington Honor Medal plus $100 from the Freedom Foundation of Valley Forge for his editorials. Nizamoff's editorial, "Abuse of Freedom", was the 1967 winning editorial written after demonstrations in Washington, D.C. Nizamoff wrote the 1969 editorial, "A Need for Rededication", in response to the spread of violent dissent and disruption in the United States during the Nixon administration. The same Freedom House granted an award to Milovan Djilas in 1969, to which Nizamoff strongly objected and highlighted within an article in the Congressional Record.

He was a founding member of the Indianapolis Press Club in 1934 and was named its Man of the Year in 1966. Nizamoff was inducted into the Indiana Journalism Hall of Fame in 1974. Considered an expert on Balkan affairs, Nizamoff recounted his life in the pursuit of Macedonian independence in his autobiography, The Struggle For Freedom. At the turn of the century, Christo Nizamoff was chosen one of the 12 most influential persons who lived in Indianapolis during the 1900s by the Indianapolis Star. On October 30, 1969, he was invited by US President Richard Nixon and Vice President Spiro Agnew to the White House, along with representatives of other influential foreign language newspapers in the United States.

He died in 1989, and was buried in Crown Hill Cemetery, Indiana.
