= Larry Koroloff =

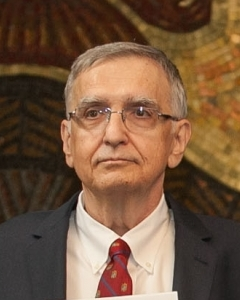
- Born: 1951 (age 74–75); Toronto, Ontario, Canada
- Education: University of Toronto
- Occupations: teacher, historian, publicist
- Organization: Macedonian Patriotic Organization
- Awards: “Golden Laurel Branch”

Larry Koroloff (Bulgarian: Лабро (Лари) Лазов Королов) is a Bulgarian-Canadian linguist, and educator, activist of the Macedonian Patriotic Organization, editor-in-chief of the "Macedonian Tribune" newspaper, and head of the patriotic organization "Macedonia: Switzerland on the Balkans", situated in Toronto.

== Biography ==
Larry Koroloff was born in 1951 in Toronto, Canada, in the family of the Bulgarian émigré Lazar Koroloff. Through his mother's family he is a relative of the Macedonian Bulgarian revolutionaries Nikola Kuzinchev and Lazar Poptraykov. Koroloff has graduated from the University of Toronto, where he studied French and Russian philology and pedagogy. He has taught history, French, Russian, and English, as well as English literature, in various high schools in his home city.

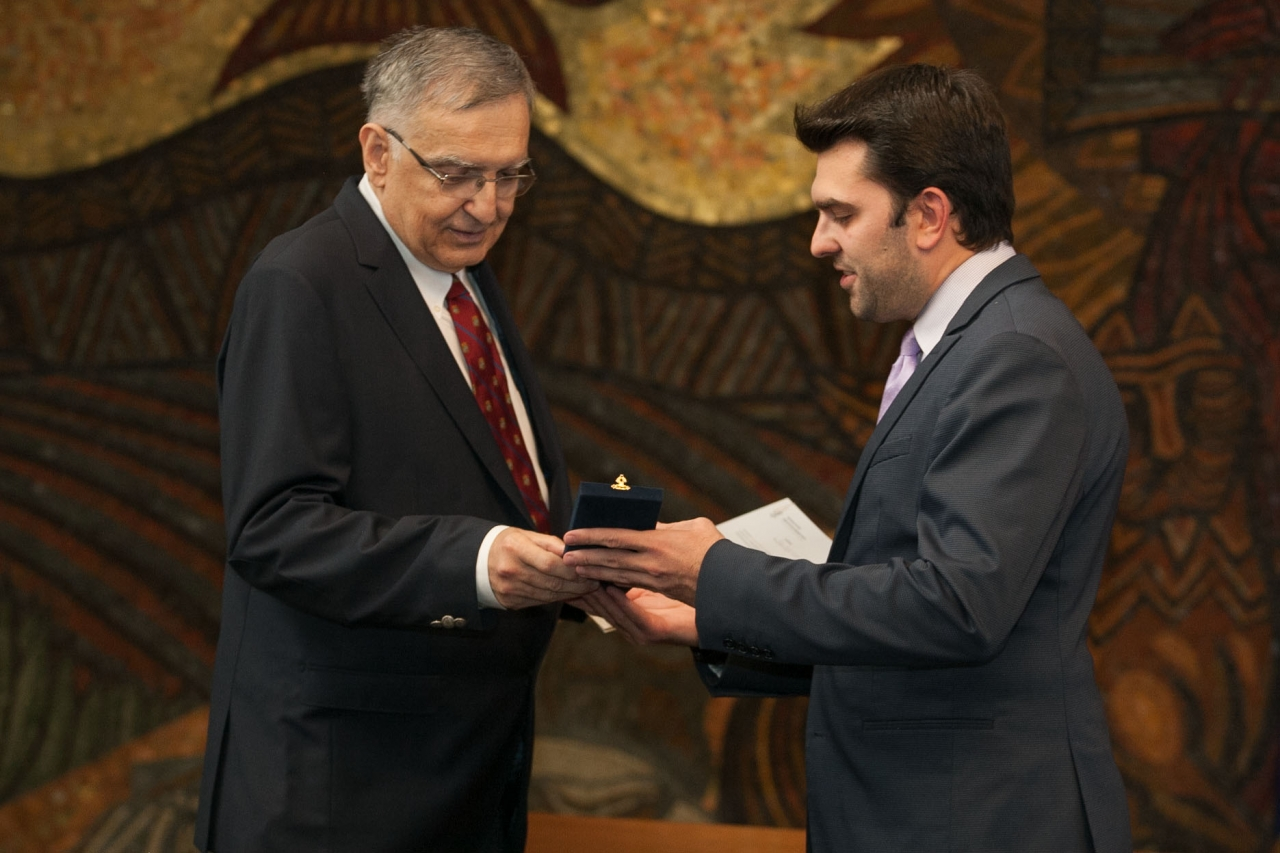
Koroloff receiving the “Golden Laurel Branch” award, 10 October 2017

Koroloff has authored scientific publications on the Kostur dialect. His book about the village of Drenoveni in the Kastoria region, where both his paternal and maternal ancestors lived, has received praise from the scientific community as a source of “unique ethnographic, linguistic, and historical information”, which “greatly enhances our understanding of the history, ethnology, and the language of the southwesternmost parts of Macedonia” and “will be the basis for any further research in that field“. The book presents the history, language, traditions, and folklore of the village and the surrounding region in the Aegean Macedonia. It also covers the activity of the Bulgarian Exarchate and IMARO, historic events like the Ilinden–Preobrazhenie Uprising, as well as the Greek administration in the 1912–1950 years. The research is based on interviews with numerous people from the village, who had emigrated to North America, and on voluminous historiographical and dialectological literature. Larry Koroloff also financed the printing of the book “Bulgarian Dialect Texts from Aegean Macedonia“ of the notable Bulgarian dialectologist and phonologist Blagoy Shklifov, and sponsored its publication by the Bulgarian Academy of Sciences in 2003.

Larry Koroloff was a member of the Central Committee of the Macedonian Patriotic Organization in 2010–2014. He was the editor-in-chief from September 2011 to June, 2023, of the “Macedonian Tribune” newspaper, “the oldest Macedonian newspaper in the world published continuously since February 10, 1927”.

Koroloff has been awarded with the highest award of the Bulgarian Ministry of Foreign Affairs, the “Golden Laurel Branch”, for his “many-year activity and contribution to the preservation of the Bulgarian nature of the [Macedonian Patriotic Organization], for strengthening of the national and cultural identity of the Bulgarian emigrants in Canada”.

“Your life and your deed are an example of inspiration. I hope that many young Bulgarians, both here and beyond the Atlantic Ocean, will follow your deed. Thank you for passing over the Bulgarian national spirit to the future generations and thus making us feel worthy for being Bulgarians and living in these lands”

— Deputy Minister of Foreign Affairs Georg Georgiev on presenting the “Golden Laurel Branch” award to Larry Koroloff

== Bibliography ==
- Koroloff, Larry, Drenòveni: The Life and Demise of a Macedonian Village, Pickering, ON, Britannia Printers, 2016, 342 pages, ISBN 978-177-1363-92-1 (in English)
- Королов, Лари-Лабро, Дренòвени: Разцвет и разорение на едно село в Южна Македония, София, Македонски научен институт, 2016, 360 с., ISBN 978-954-8187-98-5 (in Bulgarian)
