= Vlado Chernozemski =

Bulgarian revolutionary (1897–1934)

- Владо Черноземски
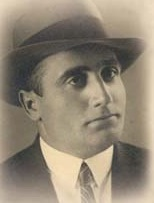
- Born: Velichko Dimitrov Kerin; October 19, 1897; Kamenitsa, Bulgaria
- Died: October 9, 1934 (aged 36); Marseille, France
- Occupation: Driver
- Years active: 1922–1934
- Organization: Internal Macedonian Revolutionary Organization
- Known for: Assassinations of: Alexander I of Yugoslavia (1934); Naum Tomalevski (1930); Dimo Hadzhidimov (1924)

Vlado Chernozemski (Bulgarian: Владо Черноземски; born Velichko Dimitrov Kerin (Bulgarian: Величко Димитров Керин); October 19, 1897 – October 9, 1934) was a Bulgarian revolutionary and assassin of the Internal Macedonian Revolutionary Organization.

He is also known as "Vlado the Chauffeur". He killed two notable Bulgarian politicians, communist Dimo Hadzhidimov, and IMRO member Naum Tomalevski. Chernozemski trained a group of three Ustaše to assassinate Alexander of Yugoslavia, but eventually assassinated Alexander himself in 1934 in Marseille, and was killed afterwards. French Foreign Minister Louis Barthou was also killed by a stray bullet fired by French police during the scuffle following the attack.

Croat and Macedonian Bulgarian circles celebrated his act. For murdering King Alexander I, Chernozemski was posthumously declared the most dangerous terrorist in Europe. Chernozemski is considered a hero in Bulgaria. The official historiography in North Macedonia regards him as a controversial Bulgarian.

== Early life ==
Velichko Dimitrov Kerin was born in the village of Kamenitsa, then in the Principality of Bulgaria, now a quarter of the town of Velingrad. His father, Dimitar Kerin, and his mother, Risa Baltadzieva, were both local peasants. He received primary education in his native village. His mother died when he was 14 years old and the young Kerin was induced to help his father feed the family along with his younger brother and two sisters. Chernozemski joined the military in Plovdiv. During World War I, he served in the engineer corps. After the war, he worked as a driver and watchmaker. As a youngster, he was prone to drinking alcohol, but later reformed and became a vegetarian. He married in 1919. In 1923, his daughter Latinka was born. In 1925, he divorced and remarried. He lived in Sofia until 1932. According to a conspiracy theory promoted by himself, he was born in a village called Patrick near Štip, that was burned down by the Serbian army during the Second Balkan War, and was never restored. His mother and father were therefore living in Bulgaria as refugees. He used different aliases and pseudonyms such as Vlado Georgiev Chernozemski, Peter Kelemen, Vlado the Chauffeur, Rudolph Suk, Vladimir Dimitrov Vladimirov etc. Even his second wife did not know his real name or anything about his past. There are no records of him in Bulgaria beyond 1932, but he was re-identified in 1934, after his death in France.

== Revolutionary activity ==
=== IMRO ===
A legend describing Chernozemski as Vlado the Driver (Bulgarian: Владо Шофьора) appeared in Macedonia, since he worked for a company in Dupnitsa as a driver for a short time. In the early 1920s, he moved to Bansko, when the Internal Macedonian Revolutionary Organization (IMRO) was re-established by Todor Alexandrov. Chernozemski joined the IMRO in 1922 in the unit of the voivode Ivan Barlyo. From 1923 to 1924, he was a member of Trayan Lakavishki's cheta. Chernozemski also entered the region of Vardar Macedonia with IMRO bands and participated in more than 15 skirmishes with Yugoslav police. He soon became one of the best marksmen in the organization, known for his courage, sangfroid and discipline.

=== Assassin of the IMRO ===
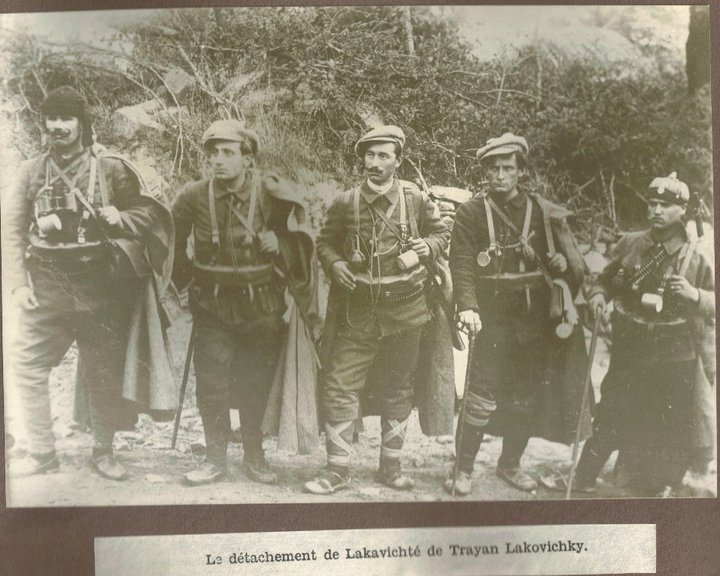
Unit of Voivode Trajan Lakashki c. 1920; second from the left is Vlado Chernozemski

In the 1920s, IMRO took actions against the former left-wing activists, assassinating several of them after the assassination of Alexandrov. Ivan Mihailov assigned to Chernozemski the task of assassinating MP Dimo Hadzhidimov, a member of the Communist Party of Bulgaria and former IMRO member, which he carried out in 1924. In the same year, Mihailov became the new leader of IMRO. Chernozemski was sentenced to death before being amnestied.

In 1927, Chernozemski proposed to IMRO's Central Committee to enter the main conference building of the League of Nations in Paris and detonate grenades attached to his person, in order to attract the attention of the world and generate publicity over the question of the Bulgarians in Macedonia, but his proposal was rejected. In 1929, IMRO and the Ustaše started cooperating, with the former training the latter.

In 1930, Chernozemski and Andrey Manov, on the orders of Mihailov, assassinated another member of the IMRO, Naum Tomalevski, and his bodyguard. Tomalevski had been a prominent member of the IMRO and a rival to Ivan Mihailov for control of IMRO. On April 24, 1931, Chernozemski was sentenced by the Sofia District Court to life in prison. After the amnesty on January 5, 1932, he was released from the Sofia Central Prison. A week later, he went underground, and on July 15, 1932, he disappeared from Sofia.

=== Assassination of King Alexander ===
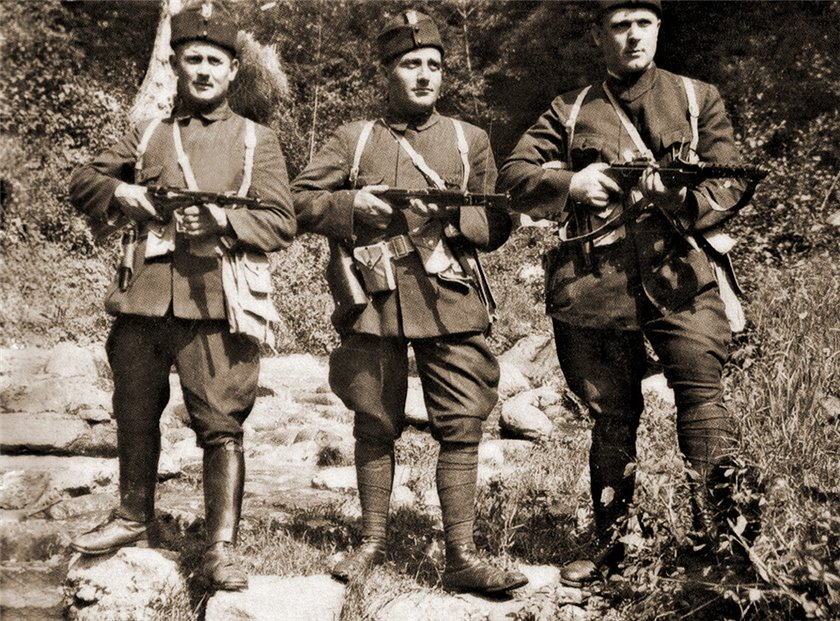
Chernozemski in the middle with two Ustašas Mijo Babić (left) and Zvonimir Pospišil (right)

Newsreel showing the moments before and after the killings of King Alexander of Yugoslavia and French Foreign Minister Louis Barthou in Marseille

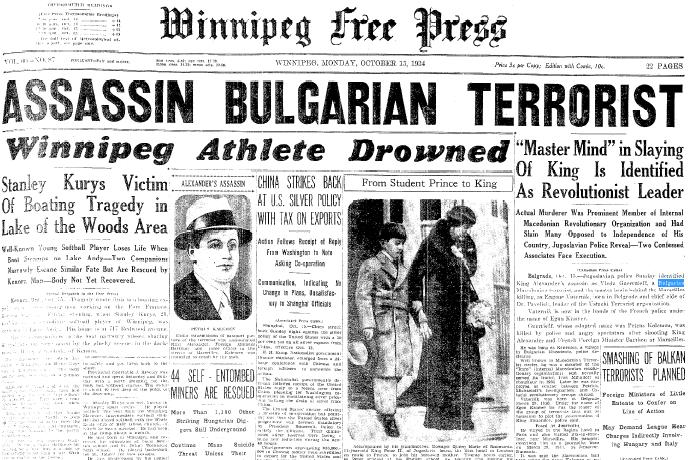
Winnipeg Free Press front page on October 15, 1934, mentioning assassination of King Alexander I of Yugoslavia

Chernozemski moved to Italy, where he became an instructor for the Ustaše in a camp in Borgotaro. He was then transferred to the Ustaše camp in Janka-Puszta, near Nagykanizsa in Hungary. The main purpose of this camp was planning for the assassination of King Alexander I. Chernozemski was the instructor of the group of three Ustašas: Mijo Kralj, Zvonimir Pospišil, and Ivan Rajić, who were preparing to assassinate the king. In mid-September 1934, Chernozemski went to Zurich, where he met Ante Pavelić's right-hand man, Eugen Kvaternik. Chernozemski and Kvaternik arranged to meet the Ustaše group at the city's train station. On September 28, the group went by train to Lausanne, where they were given fake Czechslovak passports by Kvaternik. On September 29, the group arrived in France by ship through Lake Geneva, to avoid identity checks. On October 5, the group reunited in a café near Paris' Saint-Lazare station after travelling through France separated. Kvaternik instructed Chernozemski and Kralj to travel to Marseille, where the former would kill Alexander, while the latter would remain in the crowd to make a second attempt if Chernozemski failed. Pospišil and Rajić were instructed to remain in Paris, to kill Alexander when he arrived there if he survived. On October 6, Kvaternik, Chernozemski, and Kralj went to Avignon by train to avoid identity checks at the station in Marseille. On the following day, they went to Aix-en-Provence, where they met Maria Vudracek, who delivered weapons. Kvaternik gave Chernozemski and Kralj francs, compasses, and a map of the city. Both Kvaternik and Vudracek left France for Switzerland. Chernozemski arrived in Marseille along with Kralj, with a fake passport issued by the Czechoslovak consulate in Zagreb under the name "Peter Kelemen".

On October 9, as King Alexander's motorcade drove at 8 km/h down the street Canebière, where Chernozemski emerged from the crowd, approached the king's car and leapt onto its running board while concealing his Mauser C96 semi-automatic pistol in a bouquet of flowers and chanting "Vive le roi" ("Long live the King"). He shot Alexander repeatedly, fatally hitting him in the chest and liver. The chauffeur—who tried to push Chernozemski off the car—and General Georges were also shot. The shot killed the chauffeur on the spot. A police officer fired at Chernozemski but missed and wounded Alexander's companion French Foreign Minister Louis Barthou. Barthou died due to blood loss.

After firing his shots, he was struck by Colonel Pierre-Henri-Jules Piollet with a sabre, shot by a police officer and beaten by the crowd while the police watched. Chernozemski attempted to kill himself by shooting himself in the mouth, but his pistol was knocked out of his hand. The police had "fired haphazardly into the crowd". 10 civilian bystanders were injured, while 4 people died. In shock, Kralj did not throw a grenade and instead slipped out of the crowd. After bringing Chernozemski to custody, the French authorities attempted to interrogate him. However, his face was disfigured and he was unable to say anything. Chernozemski died around 8 pm. The French authorities were unable to identify him as they could only register the tattoo on his left arm containing skull with crossbones, a sign reading "В.M.Р.O." (Bulgarian initials standing for Internal Macedonian Revolutionary Organization) and the initials "С.И.С". They also found a Walther pistol, two bombs, a compass and 1,700 French francs in his possessions. The assassination was initially attributed to "Peter Kelemen", but the reporters of the newspaper Politika reported on October 11 that no person with that name existed. The international press variously referred to Chernozemski as a "Macedonian terrorist", a persecuted Croat, a komitadji, a Soviet agent, an anarchist, and a "Yugoslav fanatic". Investigators discovered that his passport was fake. To determine his identity, French police sent his passport's picture to police forces abroad. The French authorities also researched the international press for clues about Chernozemski's identity and motive. On October 15, the Bulgarian Legation counselor informed the French police about the results of the Bulgarian investigation into Chernozemski, revealing his identity. Politika reported about his true identity, along with publishing a picture of his face and tattoo, on October 17. His act was celebrated in Croat and Macedonian circles.

== Legacy ==
In 1934, sections of the Macedonian Patriotic Organization, named after him, were founded in Windsor, Ontario, Canada, and Shepparton, Victoria, Australia.

According to an article by the last leader of the IMRO, Ivan Mihailov, published in 1971 in the Macedonian Patriotic Organization's newspaper Macedonian Tribune under the headline: "A necessary clarification. What was Vlado Chernozemski's nationality", the following is stated: Chernozemski remains a symbol of lasting friendship between the Croatian people and the Bulgarians, but in no case he is a symbol of any Macedonian nation, such as Chernozemski had never met anywhere in Macedonia, although he had been there for a long time as a guerrilla... We need to point out that both, under the Ottoman regime and in the Great war against Serbia, as well as between the two world wars, not some imagined Macedonians, but only Bulgarians, fought against the Serbian rule in Macedonia. Per Mihailov, anyone who claims he was not a Bulgarian insults his memory.

In October 2000, he was commemorated by a group of Macedonians as a martyr for the Macedonian cause. VMRO-DPMNE also participated in the commemoration. A memorial plate was erected in his honor in Velingrad in October 2005, with the financial support of VMRO-BND and a Macedonian Bulgarian association "Horizonti" (Horizons) from Ohrid, present-day North Macedonia. In Bulgaria, there are streets named after him in Blagoevgrad and Velingrad.

== Gallery ==
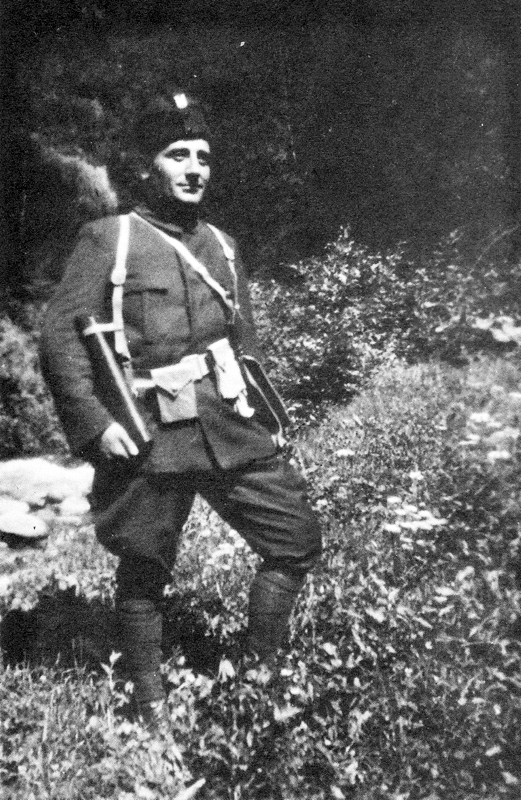
Chernozemski in Ustaše uniform in 1934.

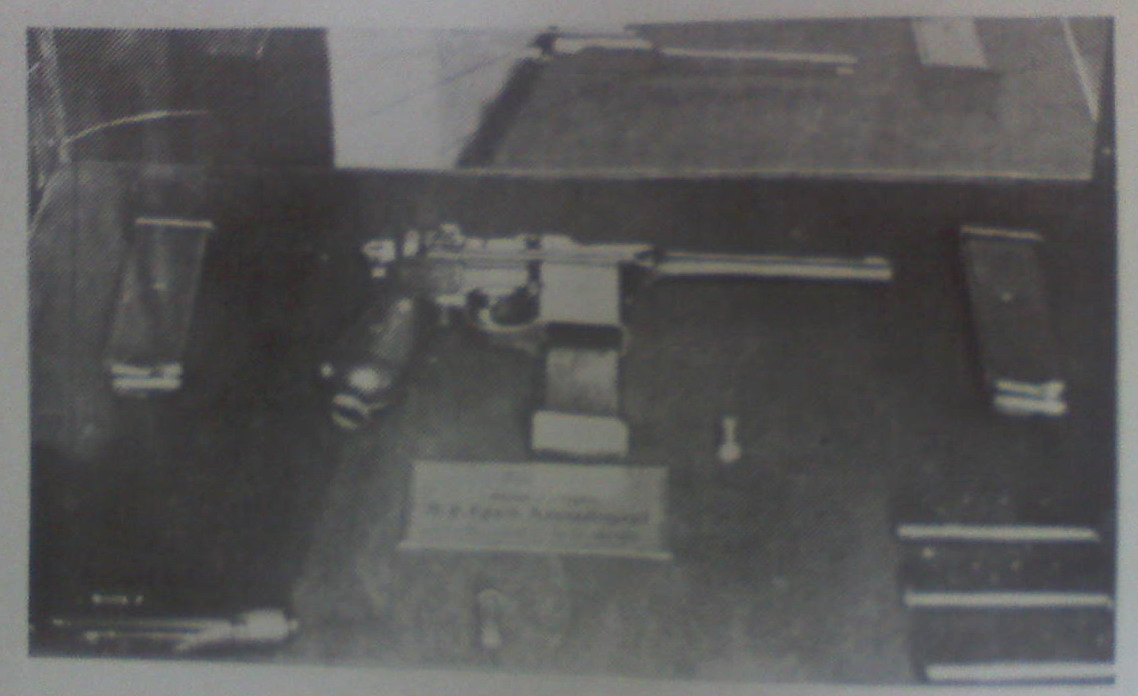
Semi-automatic pistol used by Chernozemski to assassinate Alexander of Yugoslavia.

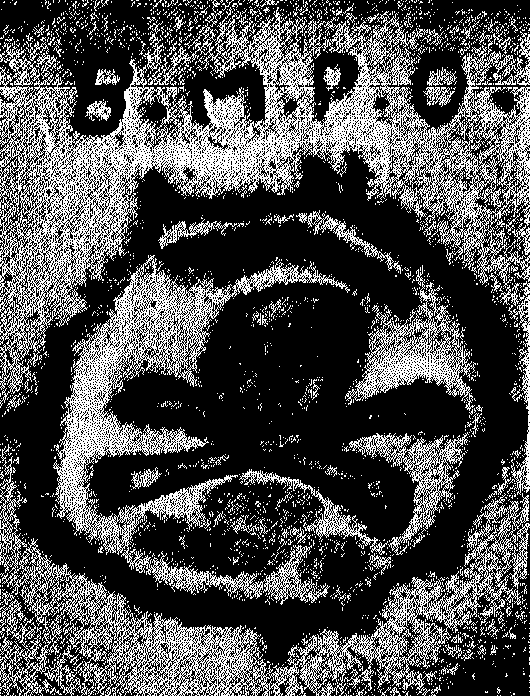
Chernozemski's tattoo, depicting the abbreviature of the IMRO in Bulgarian.

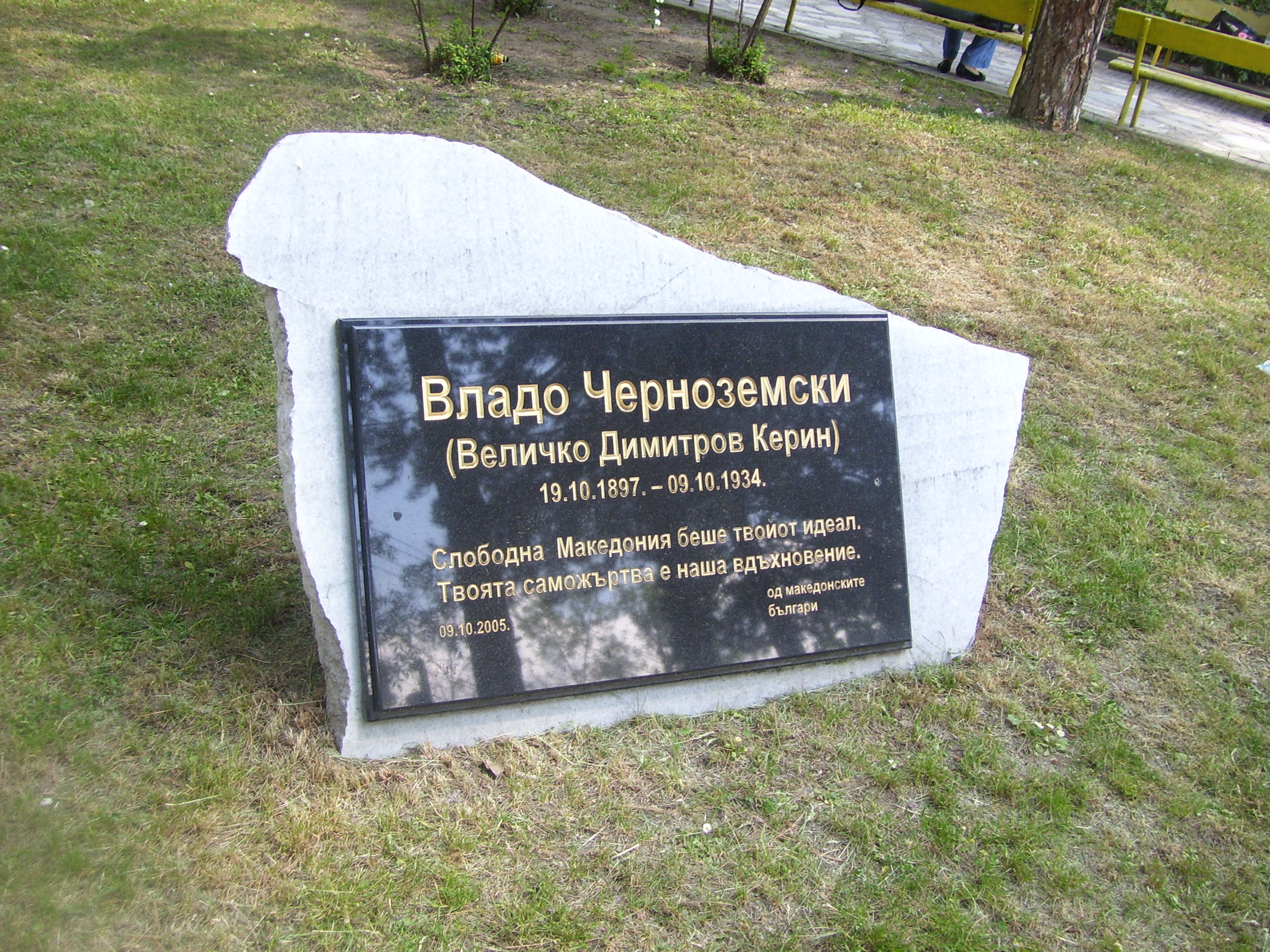
Memorial stone of Chernozemski in Kamenitsa, Bulgaria.

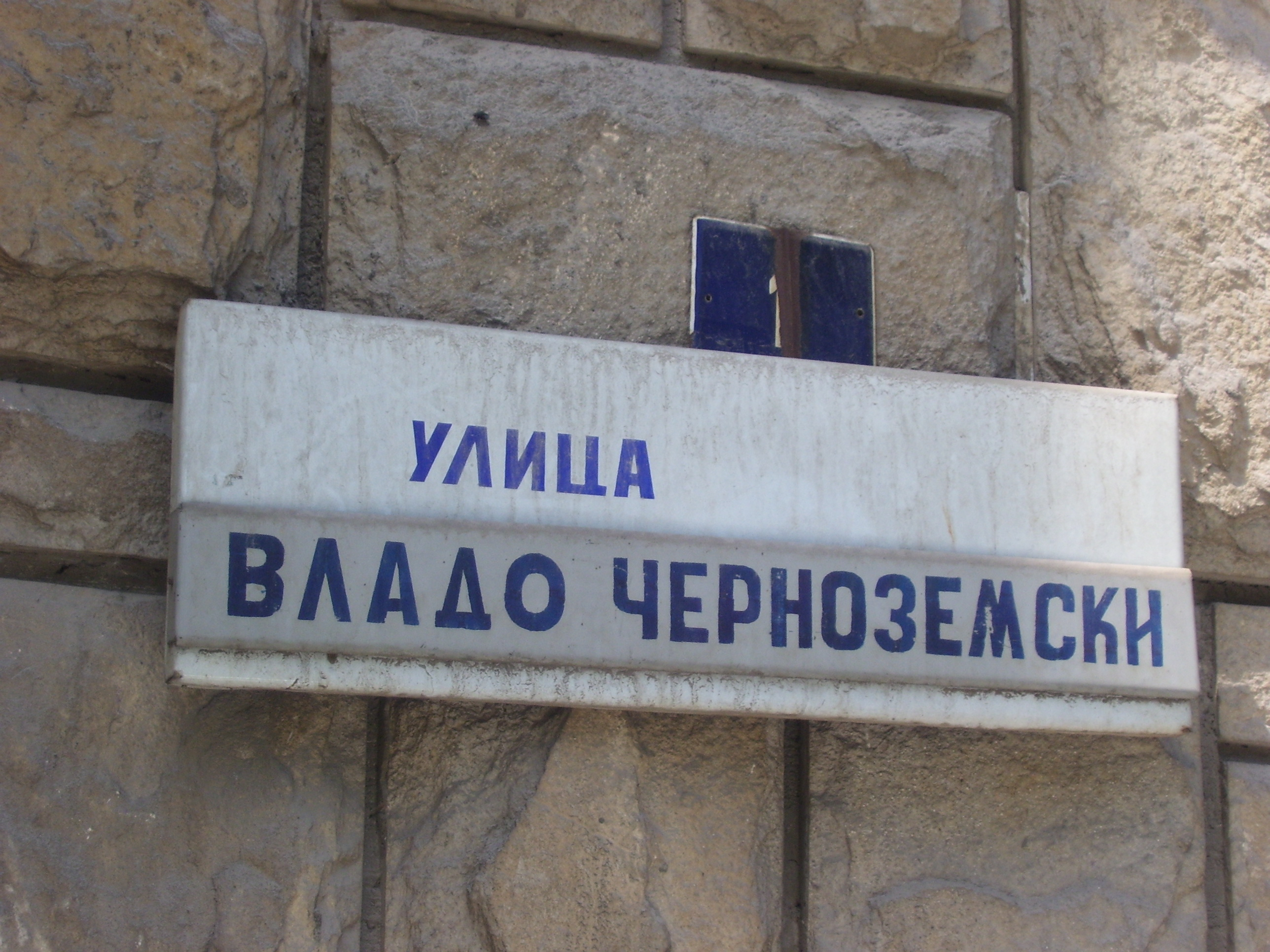
The central street in Kamenitsa - „Владо Черноземски“.

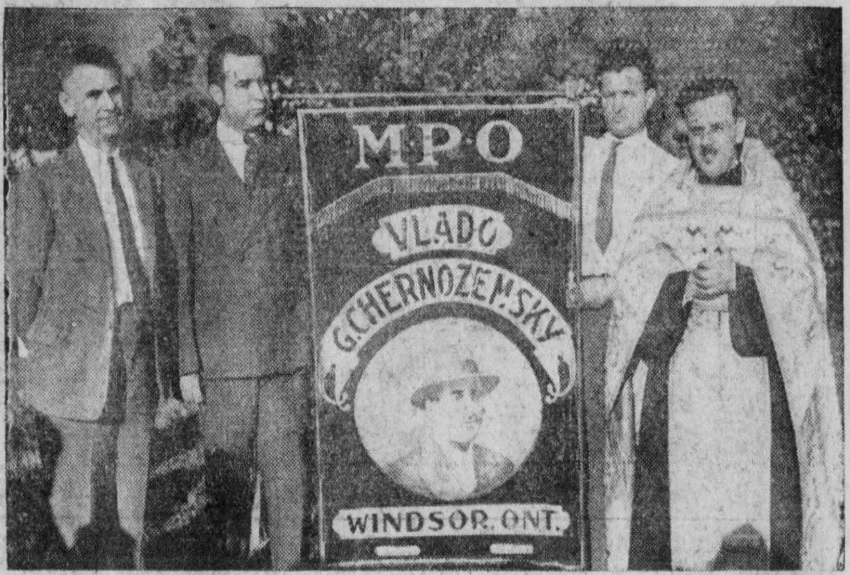
Members of the MPO chapter "Vlado G. Chernozemsky" in Windsor, Ontario, 1936

== See also ==
- List of assassinations in Europe
- Zvezdan Jovanović
