= Naum Tomalevski =

Bulgarian revolutionary (1882–1930)

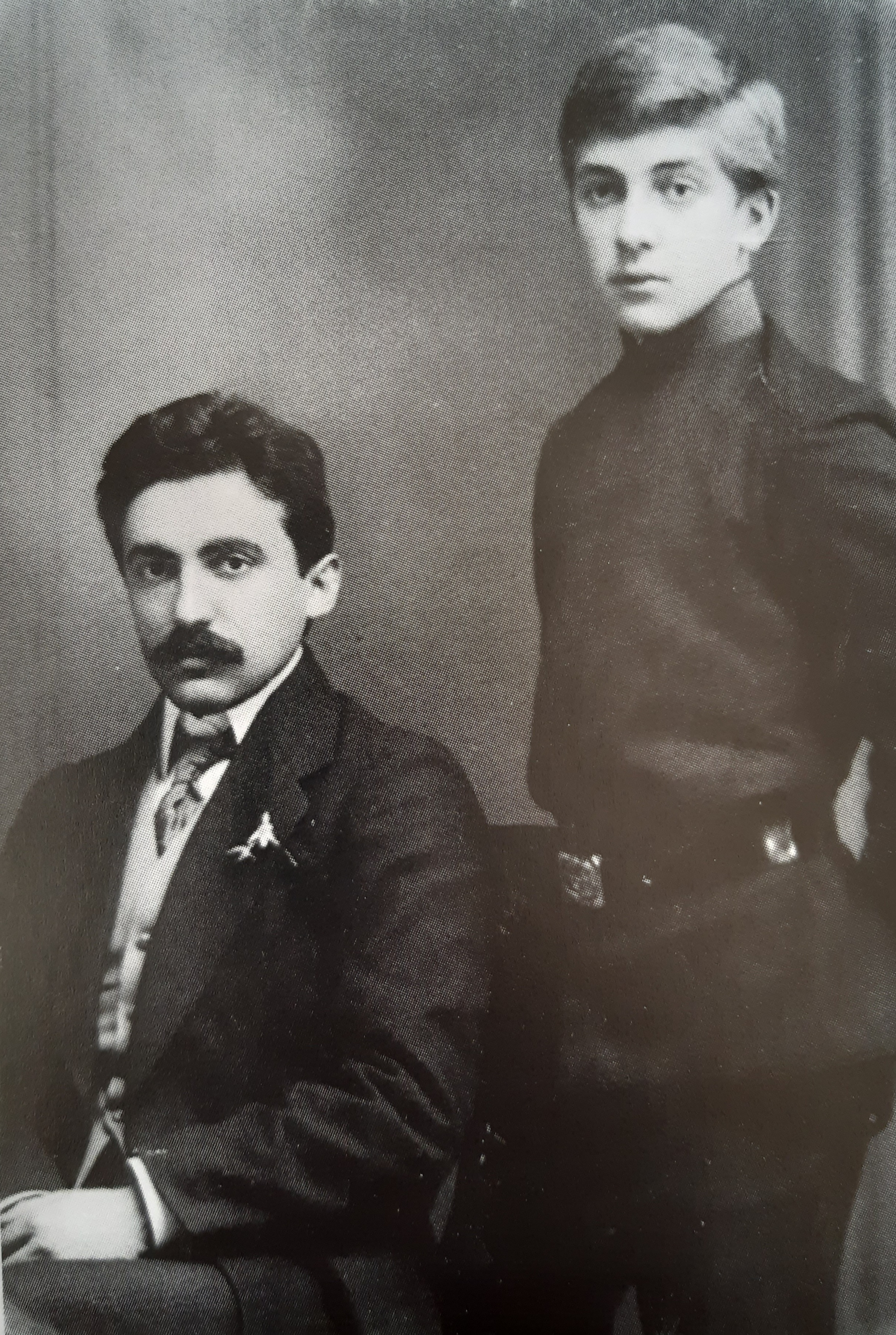
Naum Tomalevski (sitting) and his brother Georgi

Naum Hristov Tomalevski (April 14, 1882 – December 2, 1930) was a Bulgarian revolutionary, participant in the Macedonian revolutionary movement, and member of the Internal Macedonian Revolutionary Organization (IMRO).

== Biography ==
Tomalevski was born on April 14, 1882, in Kruševo, then in the Ottoman Empire, now in North Macedonia. His brother was the Bulgarian essayist Georgi Tomalevski. In 1901, Tomalevski was a student at the Bulgarian Men's High School of Bitola and joined the Internal Macedonian Revolutionary Organization there. Persecuted by the Ottoman authorities, he fled to Sofia, Bulgaria, where he completed his education. In 1902 he became a teacher at the Bulgarian Pedagogical School at Skopje. In 1903 he took part in the Ilinden Uprising. In the home of his parents (today the Museum of the Ilinden Uprising) the Kruševo Republic was proclaimed in 1903. He became a Bulgarian Exarchate teacher in Kruševo in 1904, where he was a member of the district committee of the IMRO and worked for the reconstruction of the revolutionary organization. Persecuted by the Ottoman authorities, Tomalevski again fled back to Bulgaria, where he taught at the Oryahovo and Byala Slatina. Later Tomalevski graduated in philosophy in Geneva and Friborg. In the First World War, he graduated from the Reserve Officers' School (Bulgaria) in Sofia and was appointed later mayor of Kruševo, when the area of Vardar Macedonia, called then Southern Serbia, was occupied by Bulgaria.

On February 3, 1920, together with Todor Alexandrov, Alexander Protogerov, and others, he participated in the session at which a decision was made to renew the military activity in Vardar and Greek Macedonia. He was sent by VMRO on a special mission to Western Europe. Naum Tomalevski is among the founding members of the Macedonian Scientific Institute. From the founding of IMRO until 1928 he was a member of the Overseas Representation together with Kiril Parlichev and Georgi Bazhdarov. Tomalevski wrote in the newspaper "Narodnost" (1918–1919), "Vardar", "Macedonia", "Weekly Dawn", etc. He was part of the editorial board of the magazine "Macedonia". In January 1924, Aleksandar Protogerov and Naum Tomalevski met in London with Stjepan Radić for joint activities of IMRO and the Croatian opposition. They toured Europe in May 1925, in Austria successfully agreeing joint actions against Yugoslavia with the Austrian Minister of Defense, the Hungarian Prime Minister and representatives of the Italian government. After the assassination of Aleksandar Protogerov in 1928, Tomalevski sided with his followers called Protogerovists. Ivan Mihaylov, the leader of the other faction of the IMRO, ordered the murder of Tomalevski. On December 2, 1930, Tomalevski and his bodyguard were killed by Vlado Chernozemski and Andrey Manov in Sofia.

His son, Bogdan Tomalevski, was a prominent architect in the Bulgarian socialist period.
