= Nestram-Kostenar dialect =

Dialect of Macedonian

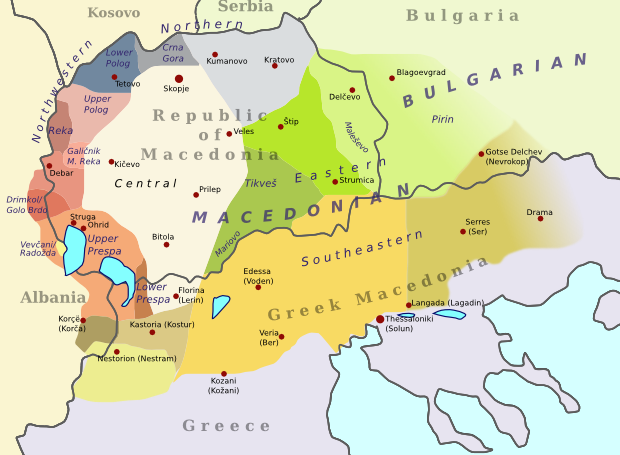
The location of the Nestram-Kostenar dialect among the others Macedonian dialects

The Nestram-Kostenar dialect (Macedonian: Нестрамско-Костенарски дијалект, Nestramsko-Kostenarski dijalekt) is a Macedonian Slavic dialect spoken in parts of northwestern Greece, in the area around the village of Nestorio (Nestram) and the area known as Kostenarija, which encompasses most of the Nestorio municipality as well as in the Akrites region. There are also speakers in the adjacent Devoll District of Albania.

The Nestram-Kostenar dialect shares strong similarities with the adjacent Kostur (Kastoria) and Korča/Gorica (Korçë) areas. Vidoeski (1991) classifies these dialects as members of a south-western subgroup of the southern group of Macedonian dialects. Stoykov (1962) in his work on Bulgarian dialectology describes them as subgroups of the Kostur dialect.
