= Kostur dialect =

Dialect of Macedonian

Kalina Stena
Recording of Kalina Stena, Bulgarian dialectology, Gabresh (Gavros), Kostursko (Kastoria region)

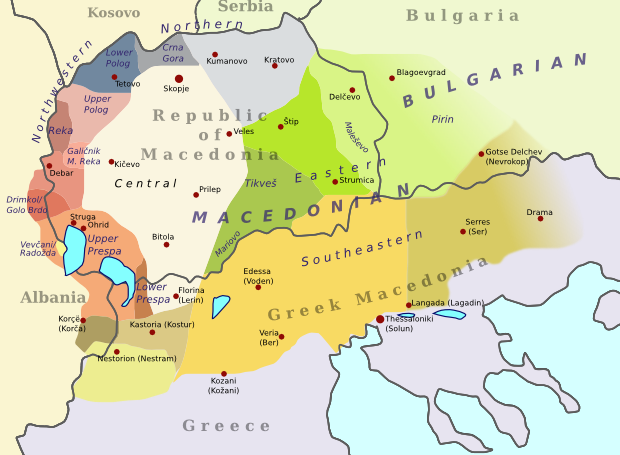
Kostur dialect

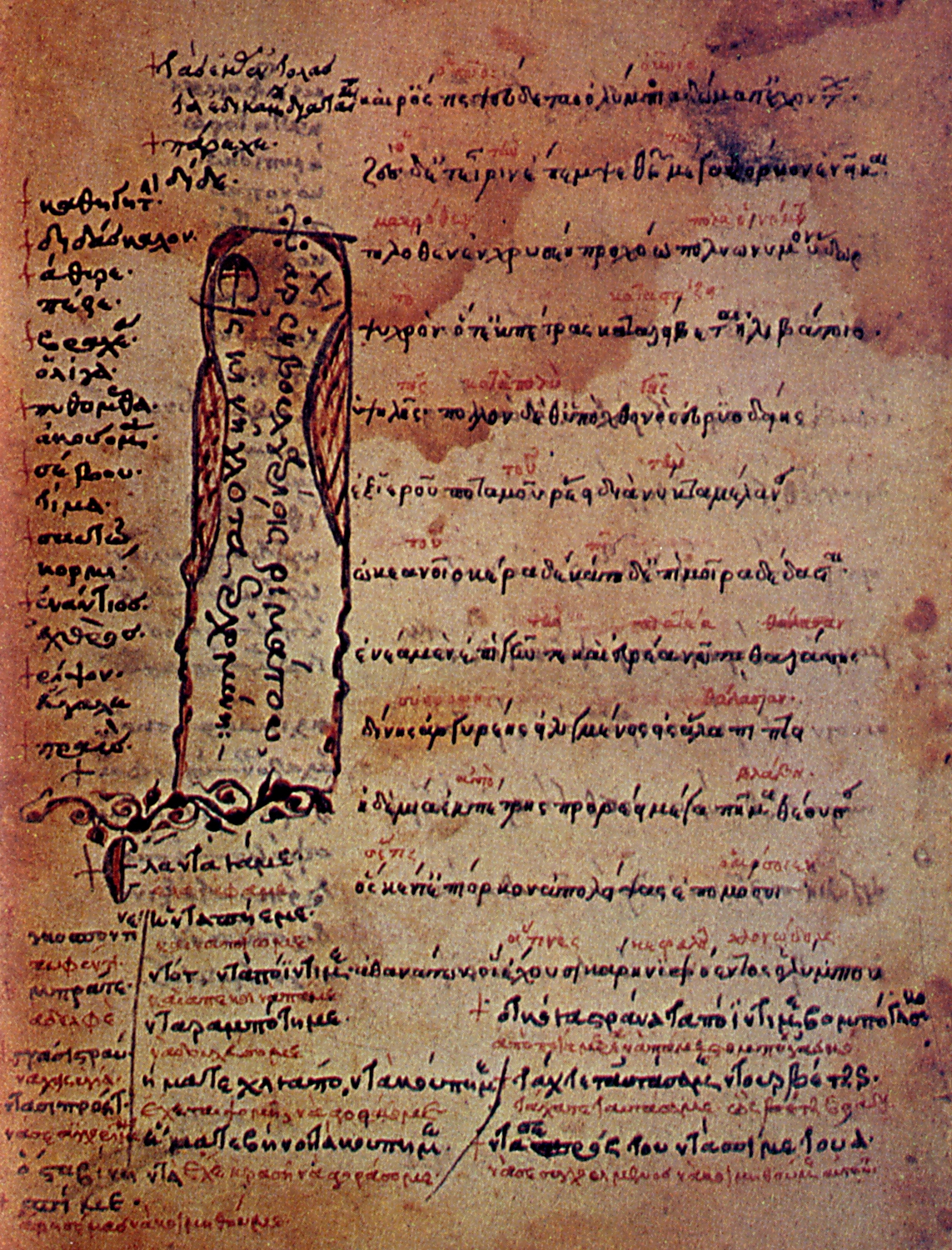
Page from „Ἀρχὴ ἐν βουλγαρίοις ριμάτον εἰς κῑνῆ γλότα ἐρχομένη”, a Bulgarian-Greek dictionary from the 16th century written in Kostur dialect.

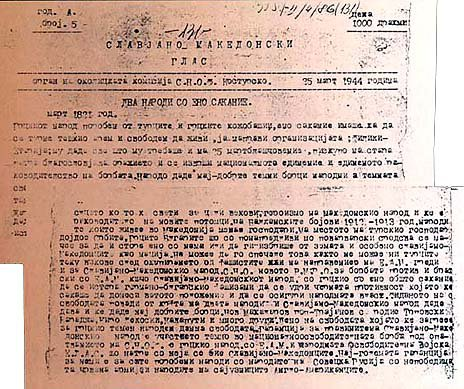
"Slavomacedonian voice" newspaper from March 25, 1944. The newspaper was published in non-standardized Kostur dialect by the Slavomacedonian National Liberation Front during the WWII.

The Kostur dialect (Macedonian: Костурски дијалект, romanized: Kosturski dijalekt) is a member of the southwestern subgroup of the southeastern group of dialects of the Macedonian language. The dialect has been regarded as Bulgarian by Bulgarian scholars.

== Area and classification ==
This dialect is mainly spoken in and around the town of Kastoria, known locally in Macedonian as Kostur, and in the surrounding Korešta region, (Macedonian: Корешта; in the Kostur dialect: Korèshcha/Корèшча) which encompasses most of the area to the northwest of the town. The Kostur dialect is also partially spoken in Albania, most notably in Bilisht and the village of Vërnik (Vrabnik). The dialect is partially preserved among the ″people of Bulgarian origin in Mustafapaşa and Cemilköy, Turkey, descending from the village of Agios Antonios (Zhèrveni) in Kostur (Kastoria) region (Greek Macedonia)″. The Kostur dialect shares strong similarities with the Nestram-Kostenar dialect and the Korča dialect. Bulgarian linguist Stoyko Stoykov regarded the Nestram dialect as a subgroup of the Kostur dialect, part of Bulgarian dialects. Other Bulgarian linguists also regard the dialect as a Bulgarian dialect.

== Phonological characteristics ==
- PSl. *ǫ → [ən] (and [əŋ]) and [əm], but also isolated instances of [ə], [a̹], [u̯ɔ], [a] and [u];
  - PSl. *sǫtь > [sənt], PSl. *krǫgъ > [krəŋk], PSl. *gǫba > [ˈgəmba], PSl. *pǫtь > [pət] ~ [pa̹t] ~ [pu̯ɔt], PSl. *mǫka > [ˈmaka], *kǫtja > [ˈkuca].
- PSl. *ę → [en] (and [eŋ]) and [em];
  - PSl. *govędo > [goˈvendo], PSl. *zvękъ > [d͡zveŋk], PSl. *(j)erębica > [eremˈbit͡sa].
- PSl. *ě → [e];
  - PSl. *mlěko (← *melko) > [ˈmleko].
- PSl. *ъ and *ь → [o] and [e], respectively;
  - PSl. *sladъkъ (← *soldъkъ) > [ˈsɫadok], PSl. *dьnь > [den].
- PSl. *tj (and *kt) and *dj → [ʃt͡ʃ] and [ʒ] (or, less commonly, [ʒd͡ʒ]), respectively, but also isolated instances of [c] and [ɟ];
  - PSl. *světja > [ˈsveʃt͡ʃa], PSl. *medja > [ˈmeʒa] ~ [ˈmeʒd͡ʒa], PSl. *dъkti > [ˈcerka].
- In some subdialects, the distinction between PSl. *i and *y is preserved (i.e. they have not merged to *i as in other Macedonian dialects).
- Fixed stress. The stress is on the penult, although there are exceptions. It is valid when not taken into account the definite morphemes.

== Morphological characteristics ==
- Third-person personal pronouns: masc. [toj], fem. [ˈtaja], neut. [to], pl. [ˈtija] ('he, she, it, they').

== Usage ==
The dialect is commonly viewed as one of the most divergent forms of the Macedonian dialect continuum. Today it is primarily restricted to oral communication among native speakers; however, in the past the dialect was frequently used in its written form. As late as the Greek Civil War the dialect was being used in newspapers and other print. The Nova Makedonka (Macedonian: Нова Македонка, New Macedonian Woman) newspaper published in the period 1948–1949, was published both in the Kostur dialect and in Greek. The Edinstvo newspaper published from 1947 to 1949 also solely made use of the Kostur dialect.

In 2011, a memoir book in the Kostur dialect using a Bulgarian orthography was published in Sofia, Bulgaria.

== Research ==
In the Vatican Apostolic Archive is preserved a dictionary called in Greek: Ἀρχὴ ἐν βουλγαρίοις ριμάτον εἰς κῑνῆ γλότα ἐρχομένη from the 16th century, written in Kostur dialect with Greek letters. This title was translated by the linguist Aleksandar Nichev in Bulgarian as "Начални думи у българите, които се отнасят към народния език", i.e. "Simple Bulgarian words, that refer to the common language". The dictionary was published firstly in 1958 in Paris, under the title "Macedonian lexicon from the XVI сentury" (in French: Un lexique Macedonien du XVIe siecle). The dictionary reflects features of the Kostur dialect in its old form, the most specific characteristic of which is the presence of the East Bulgarian dialectal Yat vowel, which gave Ivan Kochev reason to assume that the Yat border in the Middle Ages reached as far east as Kostur and Korcha.

The first modern written materials in the Kostur dialect were of different types of folklore texts, such as songs and folk tales, which were collected in the 19th century. The Bulgarian folklorists Miladinov brothers published 13 folk songs from region of Kostur in their important collection called Bulgarian Folk Songs. In Western European Slavic studies relevant to the research of the dialect is the book by André Mazon about the Slavic songs and the dialects from southwestern Macedonia, published in 1923.

The first complete dictionary of the Kostur dialect was published by Bulgarian linguist Blagoy Shklifov in 1977. Afterwards, Shklifov analyzed his native Kostur dialect, comparing it and standard Bulgarian with Old Church Slavonic, and explained the development of many sounds in Bulgarian language, notably ѫ. Bulgarian-Canadian linguist Larry Koroloff also authored scientific publications on the Kostur dialect.

== See also ==
- Slavic dialects of Greece

== Literature ==
- Стойко Стойков за Костурския говор (Българска диалектология, С. 2002, с. 181–182) – Stoykov, Stoyko. Bulgarian Dialectology, Sofia 2002 (in Bulgarian).
- Кузов, Аргир. https://www.strumski.com/books/A_Kuzov_Kosturskijat_Govor.pdf
- Ничев, Александър. Костурският българо-гръцки речник от XVI век. С., 1987, 82 с. (Nichev, Alexander. The Bulgarian-Greek Dictionary from Kostur From the 16th Century, Sofia 1987, 82 p.)
- Матов, Д. Остатъци от звуковете ън, ъм, ен, ем в Костурския говор. – Книжици, 1889, No. 1, 17 – 26.
- Видоески, Божидар – Фонолошки опис на говорот на село Тиолишча (Костурско). Прилози МАНУ, 4, 1979, No.2, 5–16.
- Королов, Лари-Лабро (Канада) Развоят на праславянските *tj/ktj и *dj/gdj в диалектите на четири села в Югозападна Македония, Македонски преглед, 2018, кн. 4 с. 109 – 116
- Королов, Лари-Лабро Бележка за формите на лексемата „български“ в диалектите на Югозападна и Южна Централна Македония Македонски преглед, 2020, кн. 1 c. 145 – 148
- Королов, Лари-Лабро (Канада). Диалектен текст от село Въмбел, Костурско. Свидетелство за миналото на българите в южна Македония през първата половина на XX век. // Македонски преглед XLV (3). 2022. с. 68 - 79.
- Королов, Лари –Лабро. „Два диалектни текста с исторически свидетелства от селата Габреш и Дреновени, Костурско“, Македонски преглед, година XLVI/2, 2023, стр. 143 - 154
- Шклифов, Благой. Глаголната система на костурския говор. – Език и литература, 1967, No. 3, 82 – 91.
- Шклифов, Благой. Костурският говор, София 1973. (Shklifov, Blagoy. The Kostur dialect, Sofia 1973) https://www.strumski.com/books/b_shklifov_kosturskiot_govor_1973.pdf
- Шклифов, Благой. Фразеологичен речник на село Черешница, Костурско, София, 2016 (Shklifov, Blagoy. Phraseological Dictionary of the Dialect of the Village of Chereshnitsa, Kostur District. Sofia, 2016)
- Шклифов, Благой. Речник на костурския говор, Българска диалектология, Българска диалектология, София 1977, с. кн. VIII, с. 201 – 328. (Shklifov, Blagoy. Dictionary of the Kostur Dialect, Bulgarian Dialectology, Sofia, 1977.
- Шклифов, Благой. Български диалектни текстове от Егейска Македония, София 2003, 287 с., в съавторство с Екатерина Шклифова (Shklifov, Blagoy, Shklifova, Ekaterina. Bulgarian Dialect Texts from Aegean Macedonia, Sofia, 2003.
- Шклифов, Благой. Глаголната система на костурския говор. – Език и литература, 1967, No. 3, 82 – 91.
