= Trayan Lakavishki =

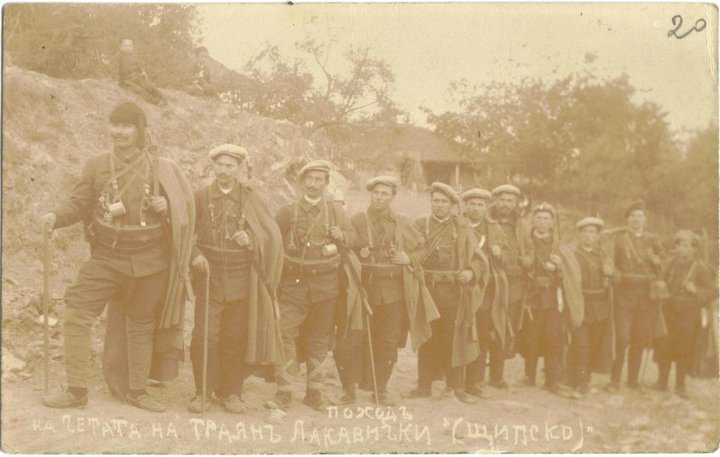
- Detachment of Trayan Lakavishki march. The last on the right is Vlado Chernozemski.

Personal details
- Died: 1944
- Manner of death: Assassination
- Known for: Bulgarian Revolution

Trayan Krastev Stoilov, also known as Trayan Lakavishki, was a Bulgarian revolutionary and leader of the Internal Macedonian Revolutionary Organization (IMRO).

== Biography ==
Stoilov was born in the village of Lyuboten, then located in the Ottoman Empire, currently in the Municipality of Štip in North Macedonia. He grew up without formal education, and became involved in the reconstruction of the Internal Macedonian Revolutionary Organization (IMRO) after 1919. From 1923 to 1934, he held a leadership position in Shtipsko. In an attack on the Serbs in Lyuboten, a detachment led by Stoilov and Grigor Hadjikimov, in association with Vlado Chernozemski, successfully eliminated 20 soldiers.

Trayan Lakavishki was killed by communists in Kyustendil following the Bulgarian coup d'état of 1944.
