= Jankovec =

Jankovec Јанковец
- Village
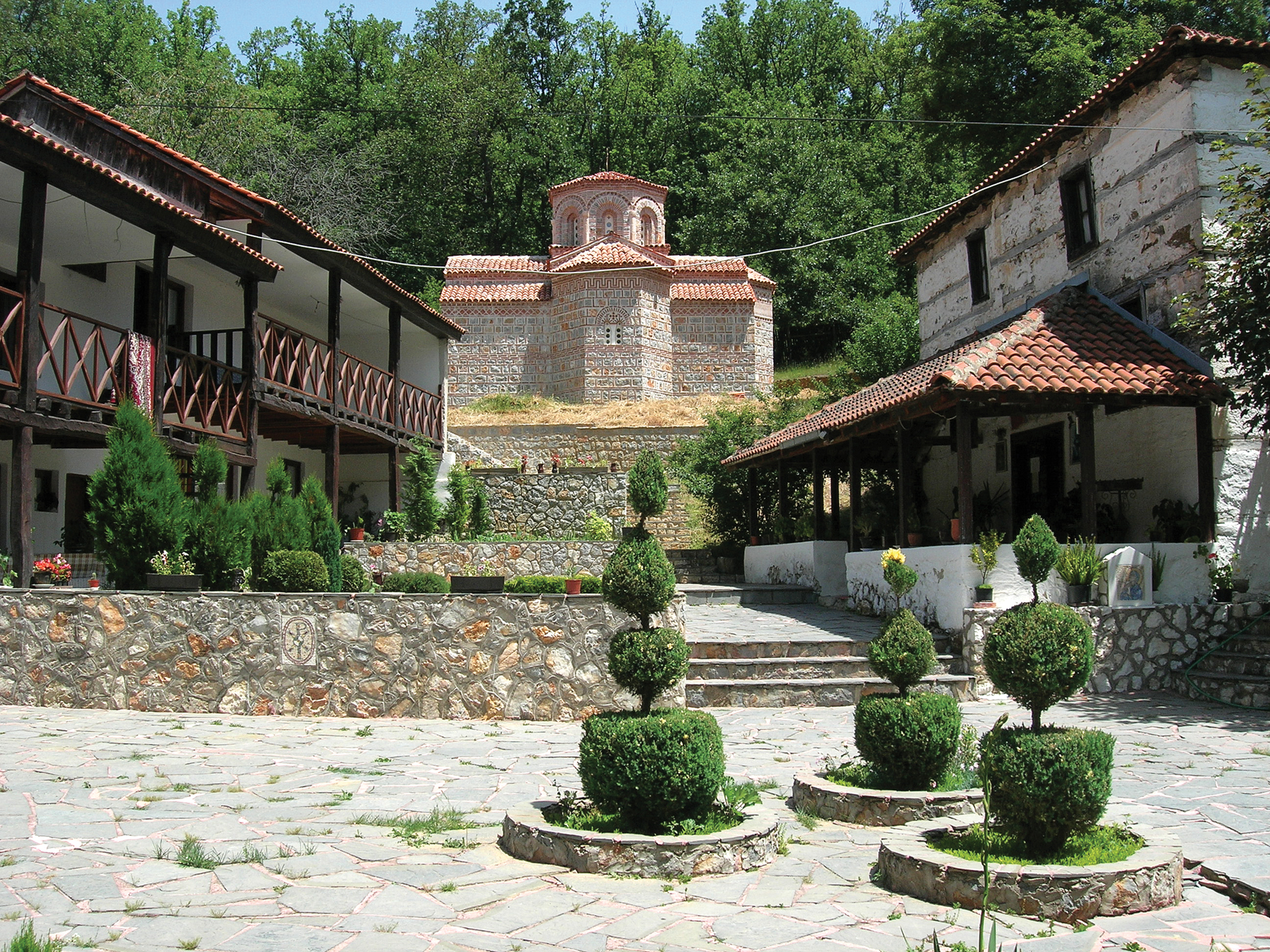
- Jankovec Monastery with the two churches: the older dedicated to the Dormition of the Theotokos; and the newer dedicated to Ignatius of Antioch

- Location within North Macedonia
- Coordinates: 41°06′30″N 21°00′40″E
- Country: North Macedonia
- Region: Pelagonia
- Municipality: Resen

Population (2021)
  - Total: 1,106
- Time zone: UTC+1 (CET)
  - Summer (DST): UTC+2 (CEST)
- Area code: +389
- Car plates: RE

Jankovec (Macedonian: Јанковец) is a village located in Resen Municipality in the Republic of North Macedonia. The people of Jankovec are mostly farmers and own their own farms or plantations. Apple, corn, wheat and tobacco are generally grown in the region.

With a population of 1,169, Jankovec is the second-largest settlement in the municipality after Resen.

== History ==
According to an Aromanian narrative, the village was set up in 1730, after a small group of refugees from Nikolicë settled there. The first settler was apparently a man named Ianko Ikonomou from Nikolicë, who probably gave the village its name. The village later attracted Aromanian merchants and craftsmen from other places.

== Churches ==
There are five churches in Jankovec, two of which are situated within Jankovec Monastery.

- St. Athanasius Church, the oldest church
- St. Ignatius of Antioch Church, relatively new church, second monastery church
- St. John Church, located in the village and was consecrated in 1866
- St. Nicholas Church, located about 1 km (0.62 mi) east of the village
- Church of Dormition of the Theotokos, the main monastery church consecrated in the 18th century

== Demographics ==
According to data by Bulgarian ethnographer Vasil Kanchov in 1900, the village was inhabited by 900 Bulgarian Christians and 180 Vlachs.

Aside from the municipal centre of Resen, Jankovec is the only settlement in Resen Municipality to have over 1,000 residents. A small part of the village population is of Aromanian origin.

Ethnic group	census 1961		census 1971		census 1981		census 1991		census 1994		census 2002		census 2021	
Ethnic group	Number	%	Number	%	Number	%	Number	%	Number	%	Number	%	Number	%
Macedonians	699	93.6	892	96.4	1,283	98.2	1,268	97.0	1,177	97.0	1,149	98.3	1,020	92.2
others	48	6.4	33	3.6	24	1.8	39	3.0	47	3.0	20	1.7	60	5.4
Persons for whom data are taken from administrative sources													26	2.4
Total	747		925		1,307		1,307		1,214		1,169		1,106	
