= Macedonian Tribune =

Newspaper and museum in Fort Wayne, Indiana, US

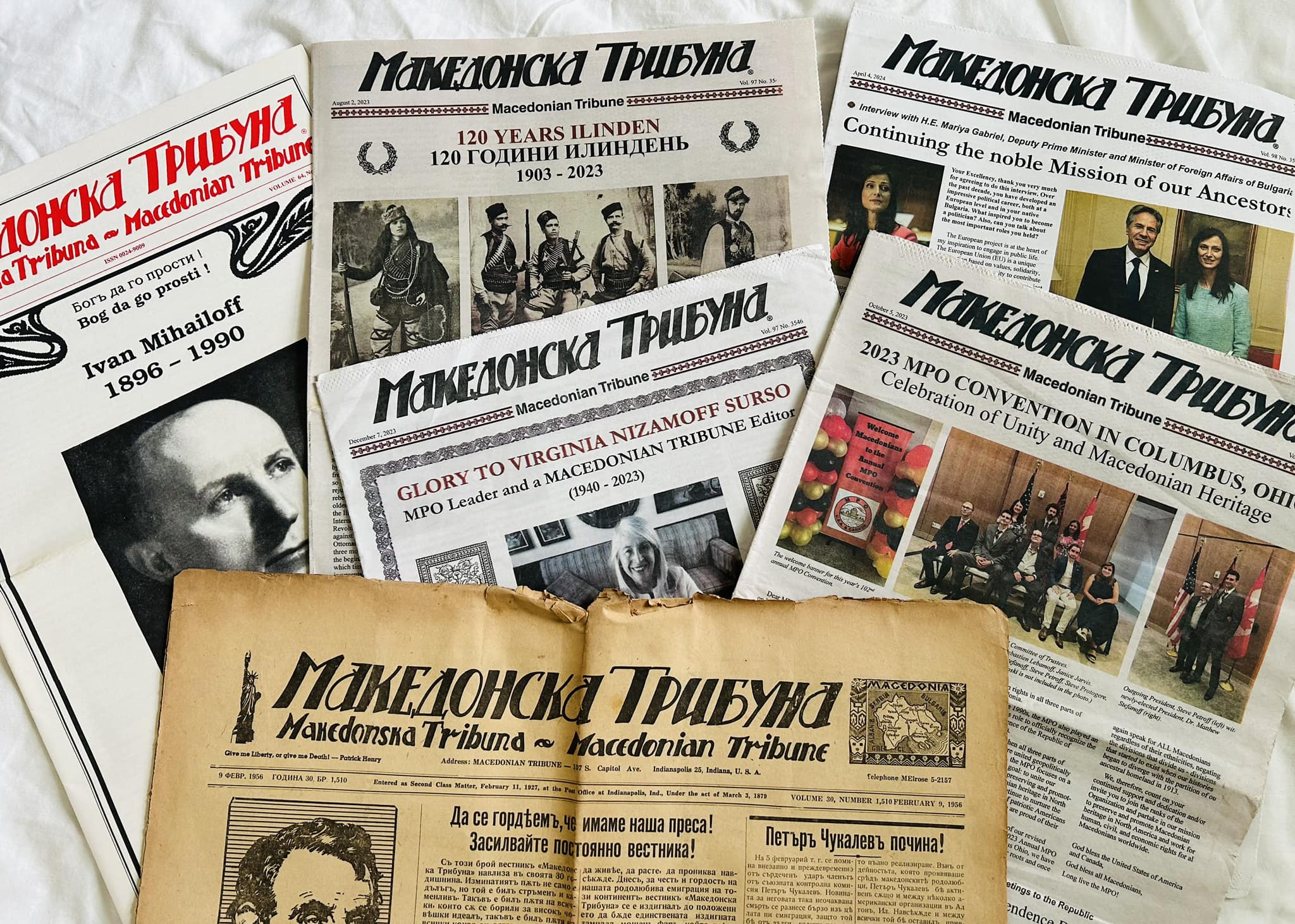
- Issues of the Macedonian Tribune
- Editor: Boyan Lazarevski
- Founded: February 10, 1927; 99 years ago
- Language: English (formerly Bulgarian)
- Headquarters: 124 W. Wayne Street
- City: Fort Wayne, Indiana
- Country: United States
- Website: macedonian.org/tribune-online

The Macedonian Tribune (Bulgarian: "Македонска трибуна") is a newspaper and museum in Fort Wayne, Indiana. The original location of the Tribune was in Indianapolis, Indiana, at 20 South West Street. It was established by Macedono-Bulgarian immigrants part of the Macedonian Patriotic Organization (MPO) on February 10, 1927. It continues to be published by the MPO and was published at the original location until 1949. A historical marker was erected at the original location in 1990.

== History ==
After the Tribune's creation in 1927, its first editor was the Bulgarian journalist Boris Zografov. It was published in Bulgarian and functioned as a political newspaper due to its origin from the MPO. Publication was affected by the Great Depression in 1929 when the MPO lost money. A short time later, in 1930, Christo Nizamoff was appointed editor in chief of the Tribune and Lyuben Dimitrov was chosen as another editor. It began being published also in English in 1934. In 1949, the location of the Tribune changed from Indianapolis to Fort Wayne. The current museum's address is 124 W. Wayne Street. It contains Macedonian culture and history, such as printing machines and costumes.

Until the 1990s, and the breakup of Yugoslavia, the newspaper and the MPO itself promoted the idea that Macedonian Slavs were in fact Bulgarians. After North Macedonia proclaimed its independence, it took a more moderate position and has been involved also in some pro-Macedonian advocacy, although recently it has been described by the Bulgarian consul in Chicago as "a century-long guardian of the cultural heritage of Macedonian Bulgarians in America". Larry Koroloff was the editor-in-chief of the newspaper from 2011 to 2023.

As of its 100th year (February 2026), the publication of the newspaper is available for free online.

== See also ==
- Internal Macedonian Revolutionary Organization
- Bulgarian Americans
- Macedonian Americans
