= Macedonian Patriotic Organization =

Diaspora organization

- Founded: 1922
- Type: Cultural and political
- Location(s): 124 West Wayne Street; Fort Wayne, IN 46802
- Region served: United States; Canada
- Members: N/A
- Key people: Nicholas Stefanoff (President)
- Website: macedonian.org

Macedonian Patriotic Organization (MPO) is a diaspora organization in the United States and Canada. It was founded in Fort Wayne, Indiana, United States, in 1922, by Macedonian Bulgarian immigrants originating mainly from Greek Macedonia. It was originally called the Macedonian Political Organization but changed its name to the current one in 1952.

The MPO has advocated for a solution to the Macedonian Question in the form of an independent Macedonian state, in which all ethnic groups would enjoy equal human rights and freedoms. In the past, the organization has generally promoted the view that Macedonian Slavs are Bulgarians. After the Republic of Macedonia proclaimed its independence, it took a more moderate position and has been involved also in some pro-Macedonian advocacy within the US and Canada. Since 1927, MPO has published Macedonian Tribune, described as the world's oldest active Macedonian newspaper. It has been published in Bulgarian and English.

== History ==
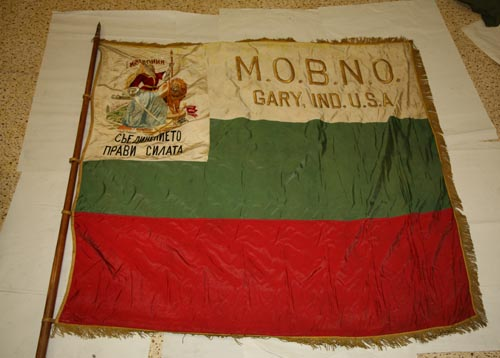
The flag of the 6th Ohrid Battalion of the Macedono-Adrianopolita Volunteer Corps in Bulgarian army during the Balkan wars. It depicts the Bulgarian flag and was brought from Gary, Indiana by immigrant volunteers. The abbreviation MOBNO is readable on it (Macedonian-Adrianopolitan Bulgarian People's Organization).

=== Background ===
The first Macedonian Bulgarian emigrant associations in the United States date back to 1899, with the foundation of the "Macedonian-Bulgarian Society Vasil Levski". Other associations include "Bulgarian-Macedonian American Committee" founded in 1904, "Nadezhda" founded in 1908, etc. In September 1913, delegates from Macedonian organizations in the United States and Canada gathered in Chicago, Illinois to form a Macedonian-Bulgarian National Union. The union published the newspaper "Svoboda", and had as its objective the autonomy for Macedonia and Adrianople. Some members of these organizations participated in the Balkan Wars as volunteers in the Macedonian-Adrianopolitan Volunteer Corps. When World War I was over, a "Bulgarian National Congress" was held in Chicago in December 1918, where the delegates voted for a resolution which was sent to the Paris Peace Conference and to the governments of the Great Powers. In this document, the Macedonian Bulgarians insisted that the Macedonian issue would be resolved by turning the area into an independent state. However, the peace treaty in 1919, divided the Macedonian area mostly by Serbia and Greece where the domestic policies of state-sponsored Serbianizaton and Hellenization of the Slavic-speaking Macedonians began. Thousands of emigres left their homes and moved to the States and Canada. For the next five years, these countries took the first places, after Bulgaria, in their numbers of Macedonian emigrants.

=== Foundation and ideology ===
The organization was formed in 1922. The organization managed to bring together Macedonian immigrants, primarily from Greek Macedonia. Fort Wayne in Indiana was chosen as the site for the first formative convention, which took place on October 2, 1922, with a handful of delegates, most of whom were Ilinden veterans. The first convention charted a framework within which to build the structure of the new organization. It was founded as an overseas branch of the Internal Macedonian Revolutionary Organization (IMRO), to lobby for the solution of the Macedonian Question in the League of Nations and with the US government. The name selected for the organization was the "Macedonian Political Organization" which remained its name until 1952. Its adopted slogan was 'Macedonia for the Macedonians'.

MPO's Articles of Incorporation from 1925 defined its purpose as follows: "For the mutual assistance and protection of people of Macedonian race - and for the liberation of Macedonia from political entities - and to foster the ancient right of Macedonia as a state and nation - all as more fully set out in its bylaws[.]" Throughout the next several annual conventions, the delegates finalized the organization's by-laws. The membership to the MPO per its by-laws was open to all people from the Macedonian region "regardless of nationality, religion, sex or convictions". The MPO had sought Macedonian autonomy, as well as the social and political awakening of Macedonian Bulgarian immigrants.

=== Early activism ===
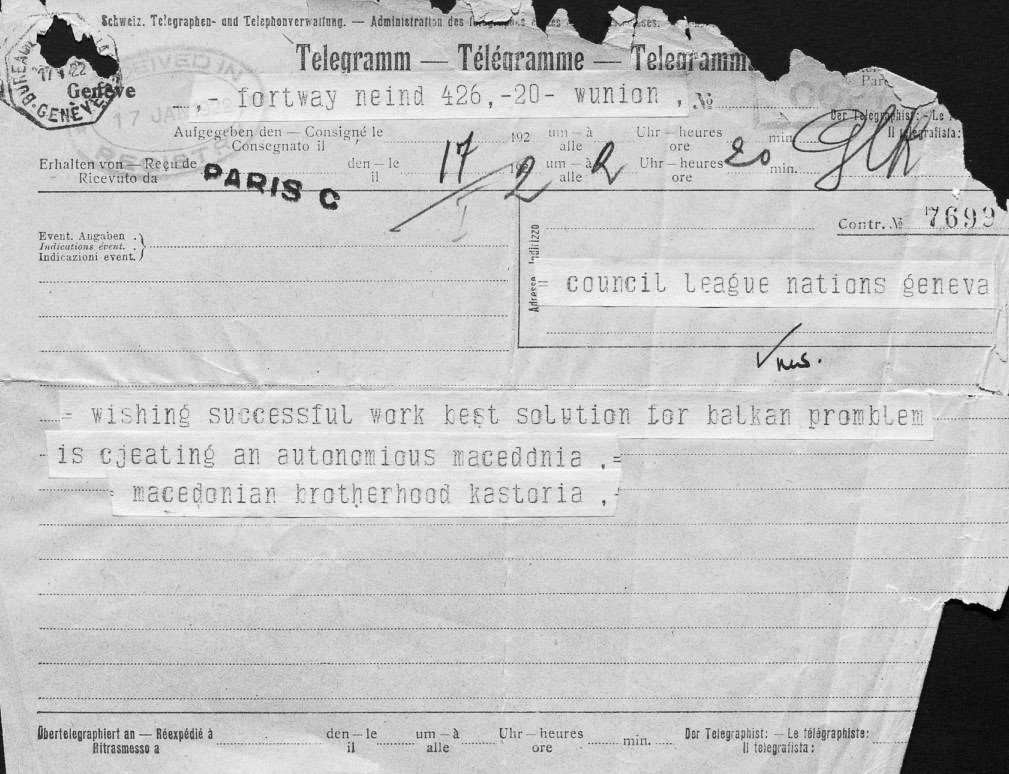
Telegram from the Macedonian Brotherhood "Kastoria" (later named MPO "Kostur") to the League of Nations advocating for an autonomous Macedonia, 1922

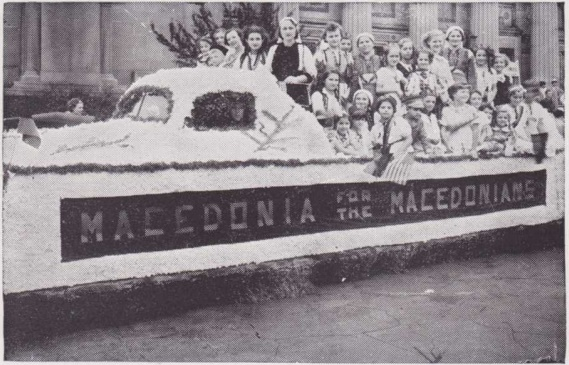
MPO parade float in the 1937 Labor Day Parade in Indianapolis, Indiana

To fulfill the stipulations of the MPO by-laws, the delegates to the 4th annual MPO Convention in 1925 in Indianapolis, decided to establish a newspaper that was to become an official organ of the organization. The newspaper was founded under the name Macedonian Tribune, and its publication began under the guidance and leadership of the MPO Central Committee's Secretary Jordan Tchkatroff on February 10, 1927. Since 1927, branches of the organization have organized remembrance days for the Ilinden uprising. There is an Indiana state historical marker at the newspaper's original location from 1927 to 1949 in Indianapolis. Tchkatroff's activities raised the attention of Yugoslav diplomatic and consular services in the US, which already had a watchful eye over the MPO. When Bulgaria annexed parts of Vardar Macedonia and Greek Macedonia in April 1941, the MPO initially congratulated Bulgaria's actions and supported the policy of re-introducing the Bulgarian language and clergy. However, MPO changed its stance on this matter when Bulgaria declared war on the United States in December 1941, and henceforth fully supported the US war effort.

=== Cold War period ===
After World War II, the MPO had 30 to 40 active members in Fort Wayne. Despite the growth of Macedonian nationalism within diaspora circles after World War II, the MPO preserved its Macedonian Bulgarian identity. While living in exile in Italy, the last leader of the IMRO, Ivan Mihailov, managed to re-organize the MPO into a legal successor organization of the IMRO in the United States and Canada. This was acknowledged by a CIA analyst report from 1953, which dubbed the MPO as "the US branch of the IMRO", and asserted that through its then secretary Luben Dimitroff, it acted as a money-raising organ to support Mihailov's activities. It continued to work for the old IMRO goal - an independent and united Macedonia, dominated by a Bulgarian population. Through its newspaper Macedonian Tribune, the MPO criticized SFR Yugoslavia and PR Bulgaria, as well as Greece's anti-Slav Macedonian policies. In the case of Socialist Yugoslavia, the MPO initially sent a letter to President Josip Broz Tito congratulating him on the establishment of an autonomous Macedonia within the federation, however, the organization soon raised its voice against the historiographic revisionism that was taking place in Yugoslavia, which aimed at diminishing the Bulgarian cultural and historic heritage in Macedonia. In the 1970s, the Macedonian Tribune regularly printed articles and appeals by Mihailov. His memoirs (written in Bulgarian) were advertised by the paper and were avidly read. His influence in the MPO was eventually diminished, when a younger generation of leaders, led by Ivan Lebamoff and Christo Nizamoff, confronted Mihailov's authoritarianism, and removed his supporters from leadership positions.

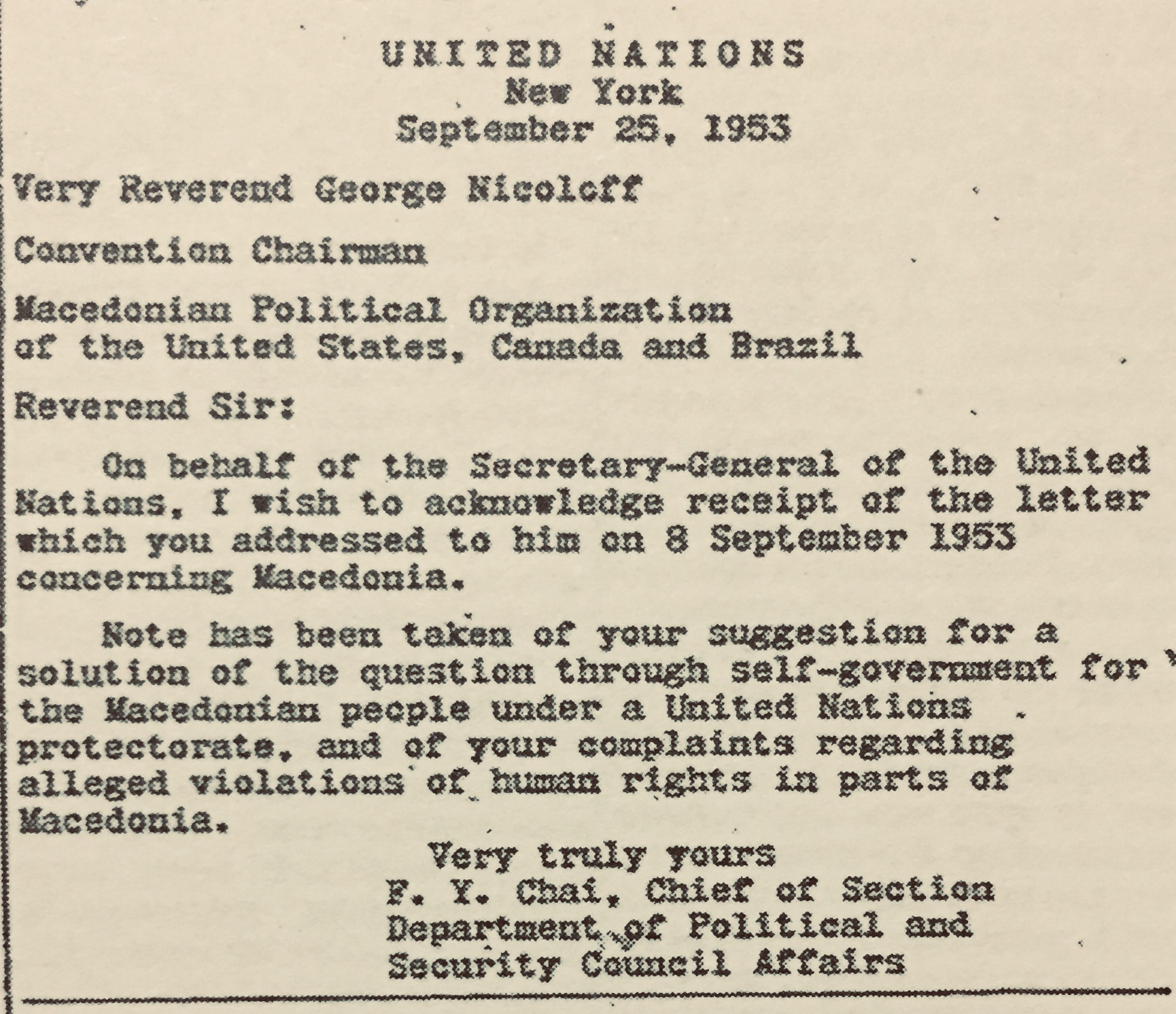
The official response from the United Nations to a petition sent by the 32nd Annual MPO convention.

Its main political slogan was the creation of a greater "free and independent Macedonia", under the protection of the United Nations. Over the years, a number of the Americans born of Macedonian Bulgarian descent began having less and less knowledge of Bulgaria and started identifying themselves often simply as Macedonians. In 1956, the MPO defined the terms "Macedonian" and "Macedonian immigrants" in its by-laws as applying equally to all nationalities in Macedonia - Bulgarians, Aromanians, Turks, Albanians and others. In the early 1960s, some MPO members switched to the organization United Macedonians and some started identifying themselves as Macedonians. In the late 1970s, MPO was present prominently among the diaspora organizations on which the institutions of Bulgaria relied for national propaganda. MPO accused the Bulgarian government of denying the "Macedonian-Bulgarian colonies in Bulgaria" their "civil rights" and "the free expression of their aspirations." In the 1990s, MPO began openly accepting and embracing the ethnic Macedonian identity, alongside the Macedono-Bulgarian identity of the organization's founders. Prior to Macedonian independence, the MPO advocated for a "Free and Independent Macedonia – a Switzerland of the Balkans," comprising Vardar, Aegean and Pirin Macedonia, where all ethnic groups would co-exist in peace. On February 22, 1990, the Macedonian Tribune published an article by then President Ivan Lebamoff, where he stated that MPO is responding to change in Macedonia, throughout the world, and in the organization itself by recognizing the reality of ethnic Macedonians, and by inviting them to join the ranks of the MPO as equals.

=== Post-Cold War period ===
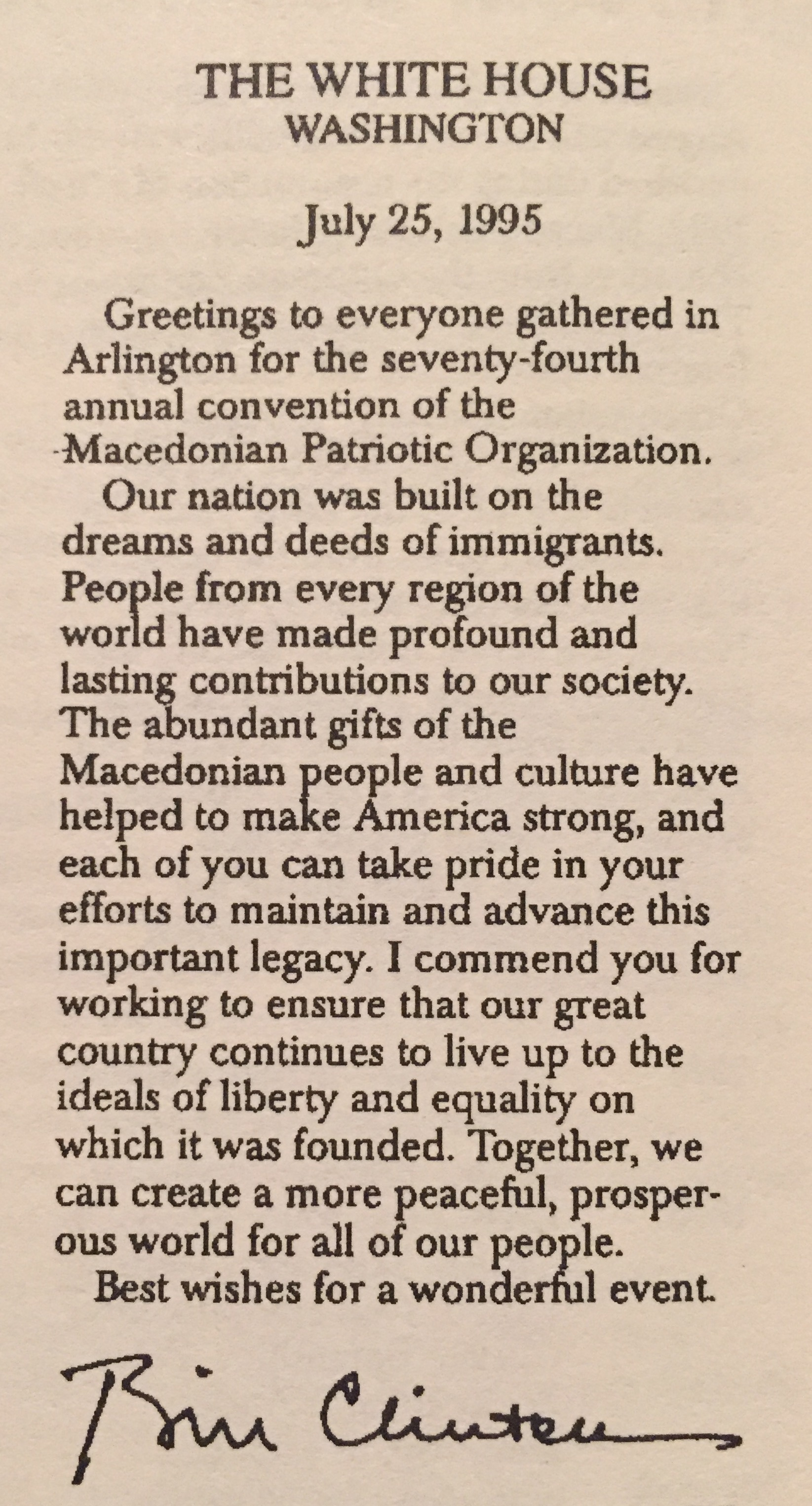
President Bill Clinton's official greeting letter to the 76th annual MPO Convention.

Macedonia seceded from Yugoslavia on September 8, 1991, amending its constitutional name from Socialist Republic of Macedonia to Republic of Macedonia. Only days after the parliament of the Republic of Macedonia (now North Macedonia) declared its independence, a delegation of the MPO visited Washington, D.C., in an attempt to lobby with the US government to recognize the former as an independent state. The delegation was received by U.S. senators from Indiana - Dan Coats and Richard Lugar, as well as by members of the House of Representatives from Indiana. Throughout the 1990s, the MPO was lobbying for the recognition of Macedonia's independence.

To exert pressure for Macedonia's international recognition, MPO President Ivan Lebamoff sent a resolution prepared at the Detroit MPO Convention to many heads of state around the world. In September 1992, the MPO organized the "Forum on Macedonian Unity", which brought together the leaders of the MPO, the United Macedonians of Toronto and the representatives from the VMRO-DPMNE. The delegates agreed on a common goal – a free and independent Macedonia, and the result of the forum was a resolution in which they demanded the international recognition of the country.

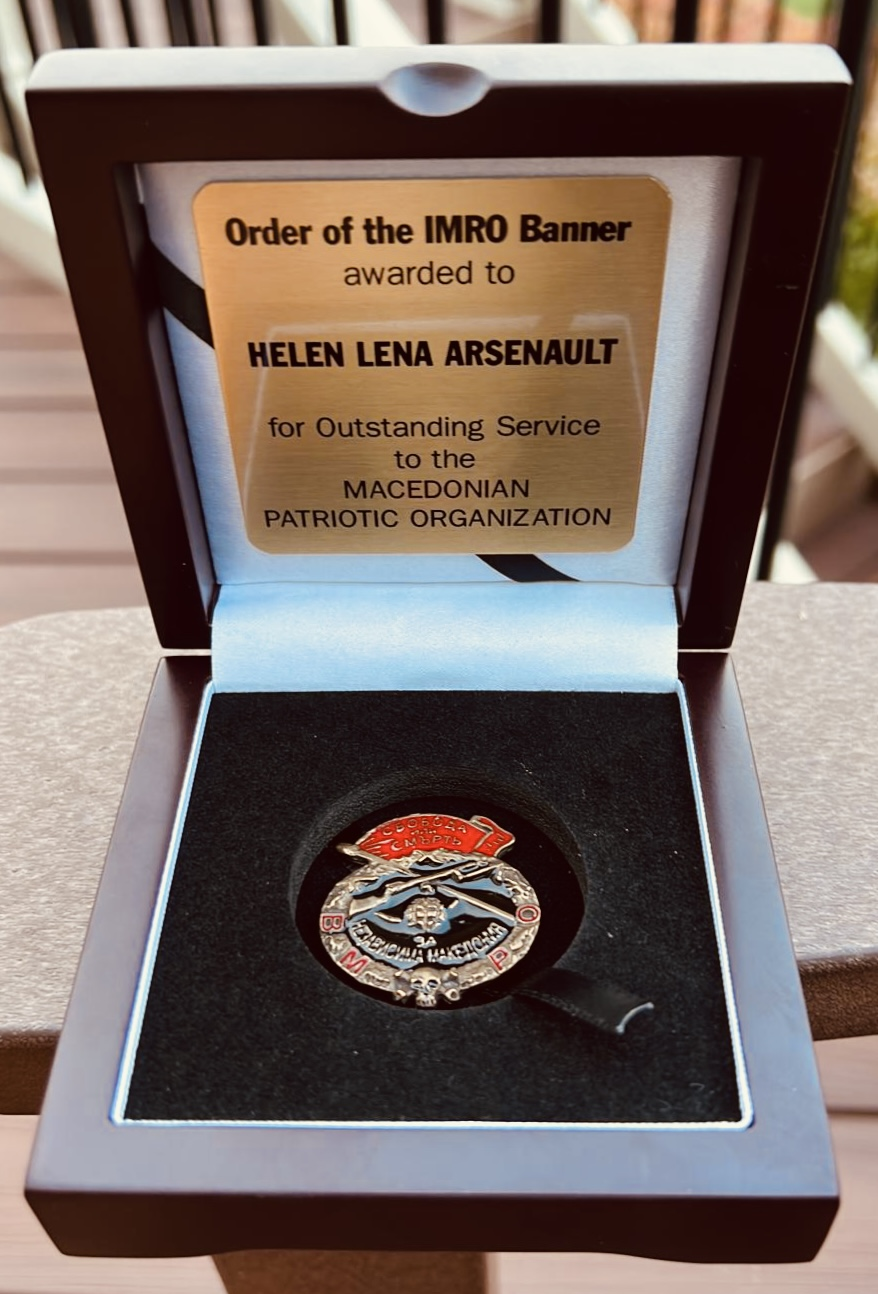
"Order of the IMRO Banner", the most prestigious award presented by the Macedonian Patriotic Organization.

Throughout 1992, the Greek diaspora in the United States and Canada demonstrated against the recognition of the independence of Republic of Macedonia, above all against the name of the new state containing the word "Macedonia." They claimed that Macedonia was an ancient Greek name and that the newly declared independent state was stealing this name from them. The Greek Orthodox Archdiocese of America also demanded that the Republic of Macedonia's independence not be recognized by the United States. In reaction to this, Lebamoff sent protest letters against this position to the patriarchs and bishops of Eastern Orthodox Churches worldwide as well as to numerous newspapers. He also demanded from Macedonian Americans to enhance their propaganda activities towards getting Republic of Macedonia internationally recognized as soon as possible. Macedonian Americans responded to his call with a mass campaign of writing numerous articles in American newspapers and making phone calls to U.S. senators. As a result of MPO's activism, in addition to political activities by officials from the Republic of Macedonia, the country was admitted to the UN.

MPO also used its influence in the US Senate to assist Macedonia's stabilization efforts. Lebamoff asked Indiana Senator Lugar to propose that the United States send US troops to the Republic of Macedonia. Lebamoff also informed Macedonian President Kiro Gligorov about his proposal. MPO proposal was also supported by the chairman of the House Committee on Foreign Affairs, Rep. Fascell. In November 1992, the MPO asked Macedonian Americans to call the White House Hotline directly to ask President Bush to immediately recognize the Republic of Macedonia. In 1994, members of the MPO Central Committee visited Washington, D.C., several times to promote Macedonian American interests. It was the only promiment political organization at the time to promote their interests.

In an unofficial interview for a Macedonian newspaper in 2005, former MPO President George Lebamoff stated: "The MPO believes that the Macedonian state neither has enough democracy, nor does it have enough forms to demonstrate that democracy. There is no vision for democratic trends in the future. The lack of democracy and vision could be the gravedigger for the Macedonian state."

In 2023, the MPO made a change to its Constitution, explicitly stating in the preamble that the organization was created by Macedonian Bulgarians in 1922. Another important change was the abolition of the list of nationalities accepted as Macedonians (Bulgarians, Vlachs, Albanians, Turks, Greeks, etc.) and the acceptance that a Macedonian is any person of Macedonian origin, regardless of ethnicity. This change opened the possibility for the citizens of North Macedonia to become members of the MPO.

== Gallery ==
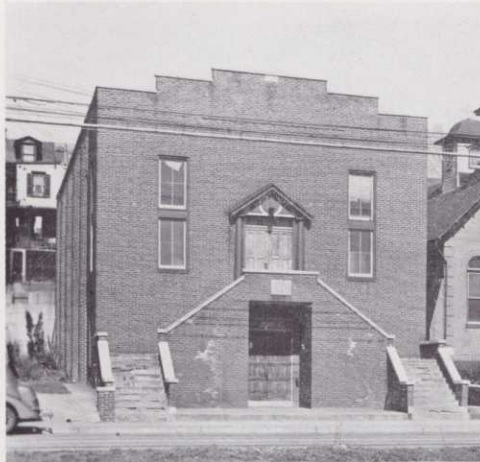
National Hall of MPO "Prilep" in Steelton, Pennsylvania

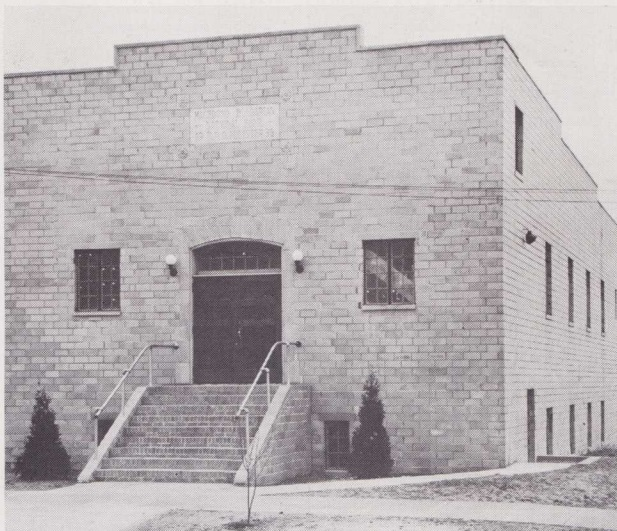
National Hall of MPO "Pelister" in Akron, Ohio

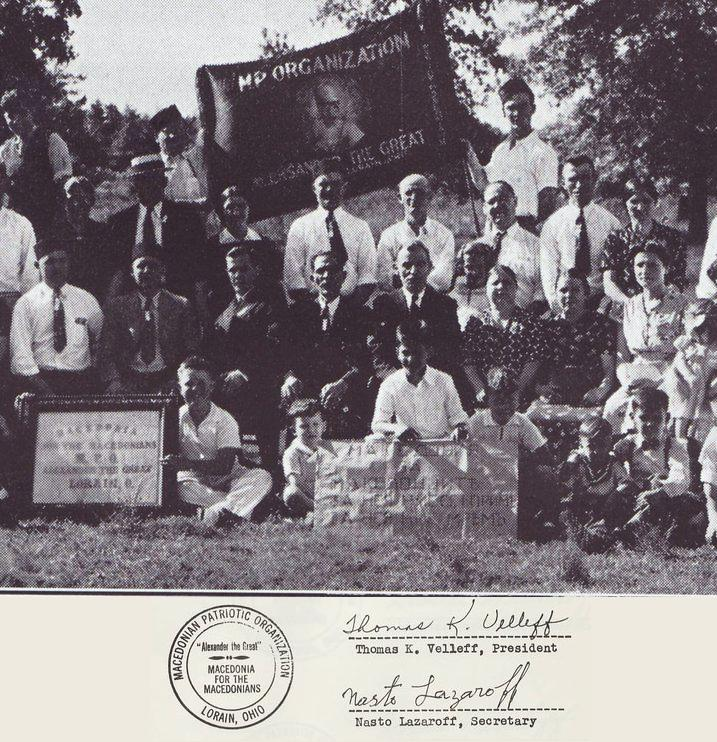
Members of the MPO chapter "Alexander the Great" from Lorain, Ohio, in 1924

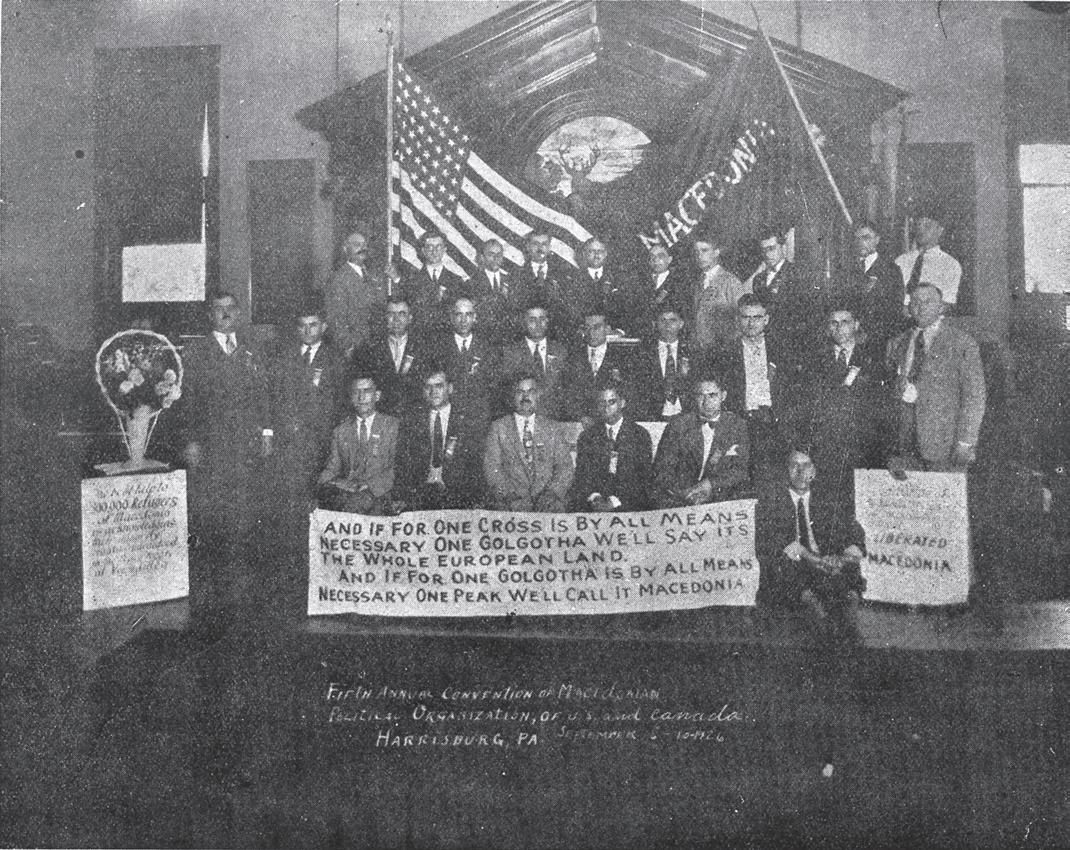
The 5th annual convention of the MPO in Harrisburg, Pennsylvania, 1926

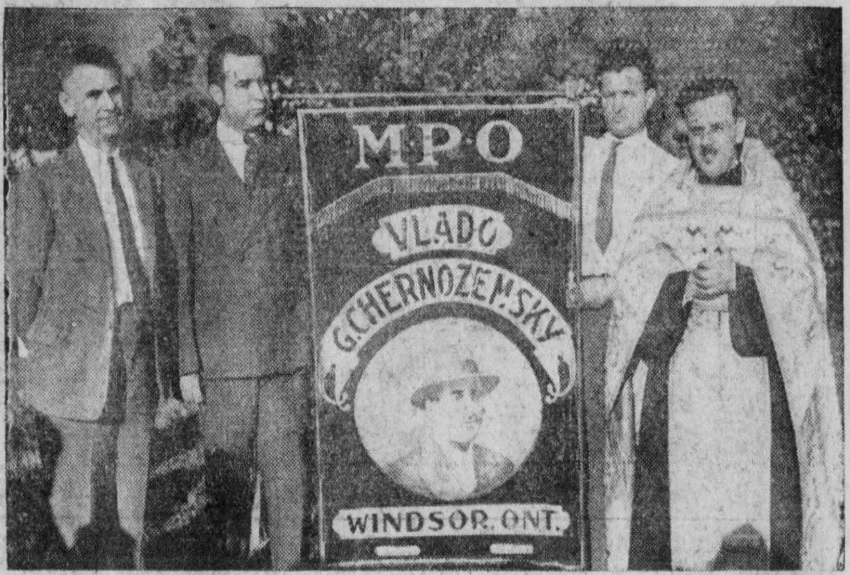
Members of the MPO chapter "Vlado G. Chernozemsky" in Windsor, Ontario, 1936

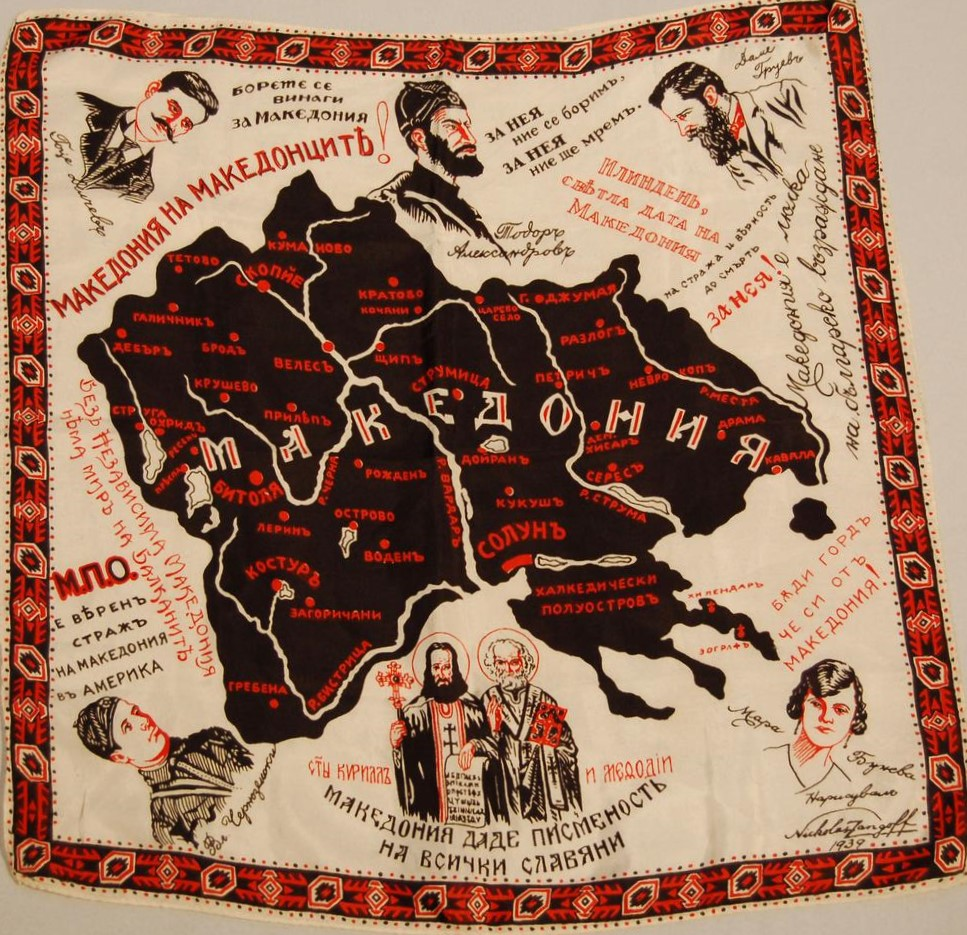
MPO commemorative kerchief from 1939 with slogans such as "Be proud you are from Macedonia!", "Macedonia gave literacy to all Slavs", "Without an independent Macedonia there is no peace in the Balkans", and "Macedonia is the cradle of the Bulgarian Revival".

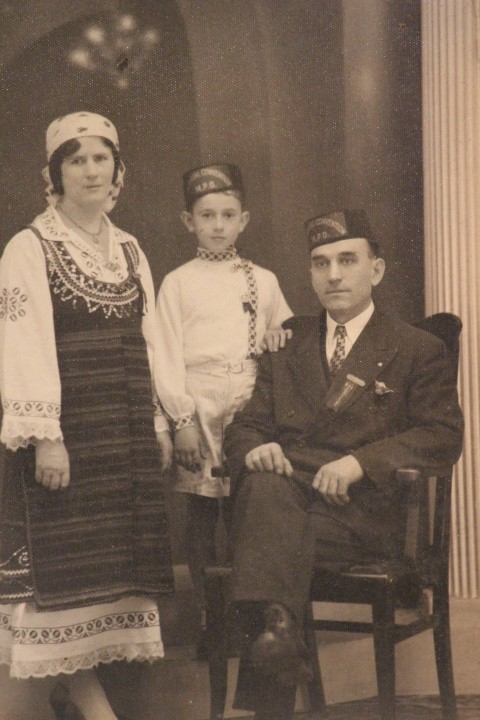
An immigrant family from the village of Banitsa (today's Vevi, Florina region) wearing MPO hats, c. 1930

== Sources ==
- Sojourners and Settlers: The Macedonian Community in Toronto to 1940 By Lillian Petroff
- Encyclopedia of Canada's Peoples By Paul R. Magocsi
- The Bulgarian-Americans – Page 71 by Nikolay G. Altankov
- An American Macedonian, George Lebamoff
