= Central Denkalya subregion =

Coordinates: 13.9333°N 41.7000°E

Central Denkalya
- Subregion
- Interactive map of Central Denkalya
- Country: Eritrea
- Region: Southern Red Sea
- Time zone: UTC+3 (GMT +3)

Central Denkalya subregion is a subregion in the Southern Red Sea region (Zoba Debubawi Keyih Bahri) of Eritrea. It is bordered to the northwest by the Are'eta subregion, to the southeast by the Southern Denkalya subregion, to the north by the Red Sea, and to the south by Ethiopia.
