= Ptolemaic dynasty =

Macedonian Greek royal family which ruled Egypt

Ptolemies Πτολεμαῖοι
- Royal house
< p t wA l M i i s >
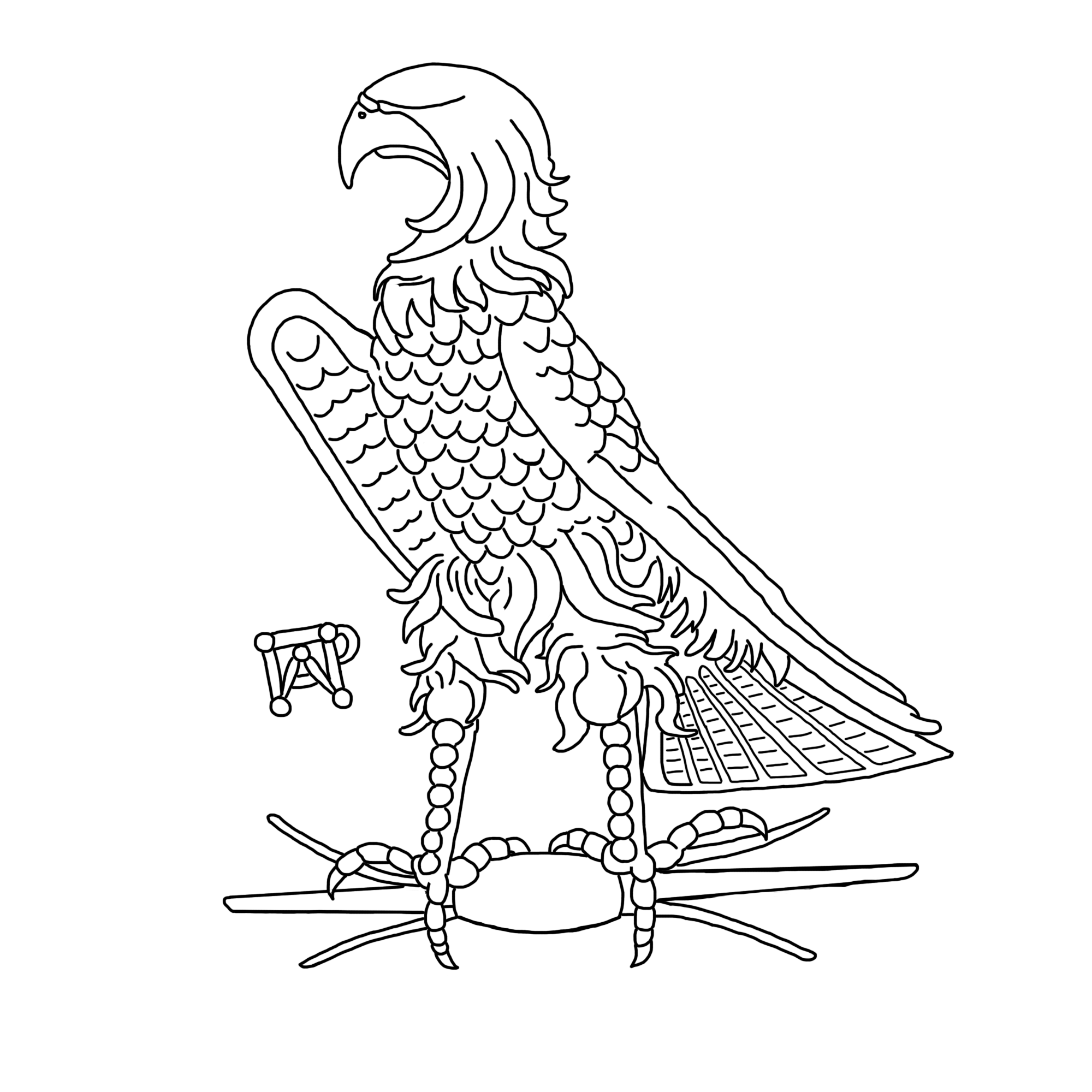
- The Eagle of Zeus was the traditional symbol of Ptolemaic Egypt
- Country: Ancient Egypt, Ancient Macedonia, Ancient Rome
- Founded: 305 BC
- Founder: Ptolemy I Soter
- Final ruler: Ptolemy Keraunos (Macedonia); Cleopatra VII and Ptolemy XV (Egypt); Alexander Helios (Armenia); Ptolemy Philadelphus (Syria); Cleopatra Selene (Cyrene); Ptolemy of Mauretania (Mauretania Caesariensis)
- Final head: Drusilla of Mauretania
- Titles: Pharaoh; Basileus of Egypt; King of Macedonia; King of Mauretania Caesariensis; King of Syria; King of Cyrene
- Dissolution: after 0054; 1972 years ago AD (Note: Drusilla's death date is unknown. Her first husband Antonius Felix married for the second time in 54 AD, meaning he and Drusilla divorced in that year or prior to it.)
- Deposition: 278 BC (Macedon); 30 BC (Egypt); 40 AD (Mauretania)

The Ptolemaic dynasty (/ˌtɒlɪˈmeɪ.ɪk/; Ancient Greek: Πτολεμαῖοι, Ptolemaioi), also known as the Lagid dynasty (Λαγίδαι, Lagidai; after Ptolemy I's father, Lagus), was a Macedonian Greek royal house which the Ptolemaic Kingdom based in Egypt during the Hellenistic period. Reigning from Alexandria for 275 years, the Ptolemaic was the longest and last dynasty of ancient Egypt from 305 BC until its incorporation into the Roman Republic in 30 BC.

Ptolemy, a general and one of the somatophylakes (bodyguard companions) of Alexander the Great, was appointed satrap of Egypt after Alexander's death in 323 BC. In 305 BC he declared himself Pharaoh Ptolemy I, later known as Sōtēr "Saviour". The Egyptians soon accepted the Ptolemies as the successors to the pharaohs of independent Egypt. (Note: As such, in modern times they are sometimes called the Thirty-third (XXXIII) Dynasty in the context of Ancient Egyptian history) The new dynasty showed respect to local traditions by adopting the Egyptian titles and iconography, while also preserving their own Greek language and culture. The Ptolemaic period was marked by the intense interactions and blending of the Greek and Egyptian cultures. Under the Ptolemies, Hellenistic religion was largely shaped by religious syncretism and imperial cult. Elements of Greek education became widespread in urban spaces, culminating in the foundation of the Mouseion (including the Library of Alexandria) and the Serapeum. During the Hellenistic period, the city of Alexandria, founded by Alexander the Great, would gradually surpass Athens as the intellectual centre of the Mediterranean world.

To emulate the previous dynasties of Egypt, the Ptolemaic dynasty eventually adopted the practice of inbreeding including sibling marriage; this did not start in earnest until nearly a century into the dynasty's history. All the male rulers of the dynasty took the name Ptolemy, while queens regnant were all called Cleopatra, Arsinoe, or Berenice. The most famous member of the line was the last queen, Cleopatra VII, known for her role in the Roman political battles between Julius Caesar and Pompey, and later between Octavian and Mark Antony. Her apparent suicide after the Roman conquest of Egypt marked the end of Ptolemaic rule in Egypt.

== Rulers and consorts ==
Dates in brackets represent the regnal dates of the Ptolemaic pharaohs. They frequently ruled jointly with their wives, who were often also their sisters, aunts or cousins. Several queens exercised regal authority. Of these, one of the last and most famous was Cleopatra ("Cleopatra VII Philopator", 51–30 BC), with her two brothers and her son serving as successive nominal co-rulers. Several systems exist for numbering the later rulers; the one used here is the one most widely employed by modern scholars.

- Ptolemy I Soter (305–282 BC) married Thaïs, Artakama, Eurydice, and finally Berenice I
- Ptolemy II Philadelphus (282–246 BC) co-ruler since 285 BC; married Arsinoe I, then Arsinoe II;
  - with his nephew Ptolemy Epigonos (267–259 BC)
- Ptolemy III Euergetes (246–221 BC) married Berenice II
- Ptolemy IV Philopator (221–203 BC) married Arsinoe III
- Ptolemy V Epiphanes (203–181 BC) married Cleopatra I
- Ptolemy VI Philometor (181–164 BC) married Cleopatra II
  - Ptolemy VII Neos Philopator (posthumously named king)
- Ptolemy VIII Physcon (170–163 BC), married Cleopatra II
- Ptolemy VI Philometor (163–145 BC)
  - briefly with Ptolemy Eupator (152 BC)
- Ptolemy VIII Physcon (145–131 BC), married Cleopatra III
- Cleopatra II Philometor Soteira (170–116 BC), co-ruler with Ptolemy VI, VIII, IX and Cleopatra III, briefly expelled Ptolemy VIII from Alexandria and ruled as sole pharaoh
- Ptolemy VIII Physcon (127–116 BC), reconciled with Cleopatra II in 124 BC
  - with Ptolemy Apion (c. 120–96 BC), king of Cyrene.
- Cleopatra III Philometor Soteira Kokke (141–131 BC, 127–101 BC) ruled jointly with Ptolemy VIII, Cleopatra II, Ptolemy IX and Ptolemy X
- Ptolemy IX Soter Lathyros (116–107 BC) married Cleopatra IV; ruled jointly with Cleopatra III
- Ptolemy X Alexander I (107–88 BC) married Cleopatra Selene I, then Berenice III; ruled with Cleopatra III till 101 BC
- Ptolemy IX Soter Lathyros (88–81 BC) married Cleopatra Selene
- Berenice III Philopator (101–88, 81–80 BC)
- Ptolemy XI Alexander II (80 BC) married and ruled jointly with Berenice III before murdering her; ruled alone for 19 days after that.
- Ptolemy XII Neos Dionysos Auletes (80–58 BC) married Cleopatra V Tryphaena
- Cleopatra V Tryphaena (79–69 BC) ruled jointly with her husband Ptolemy XII until her death or deposition
- Berenice IV (58–55 BC) ruled jointly with Cleopatra VI Tryphaena (58–57 BC), possibly identical with Cleopatra V Tryphaena
- Ptolemy XII Neos Dionysos Auletes (55–51 BC)
- Cleopatra VII Thea Philopator (51–30 BC)
  - with Ptolemy XIII Theos Philopator (51–47 BC)
  - with Arsinoe IV (48–47 BC) as rival queen
  - with Ptolemy XIV Philopator (47–44 BC)
  - with Ptolemy XV Caesarion (44–30 BC)

=== Other notable members of the Ptolemaic dynasty ===
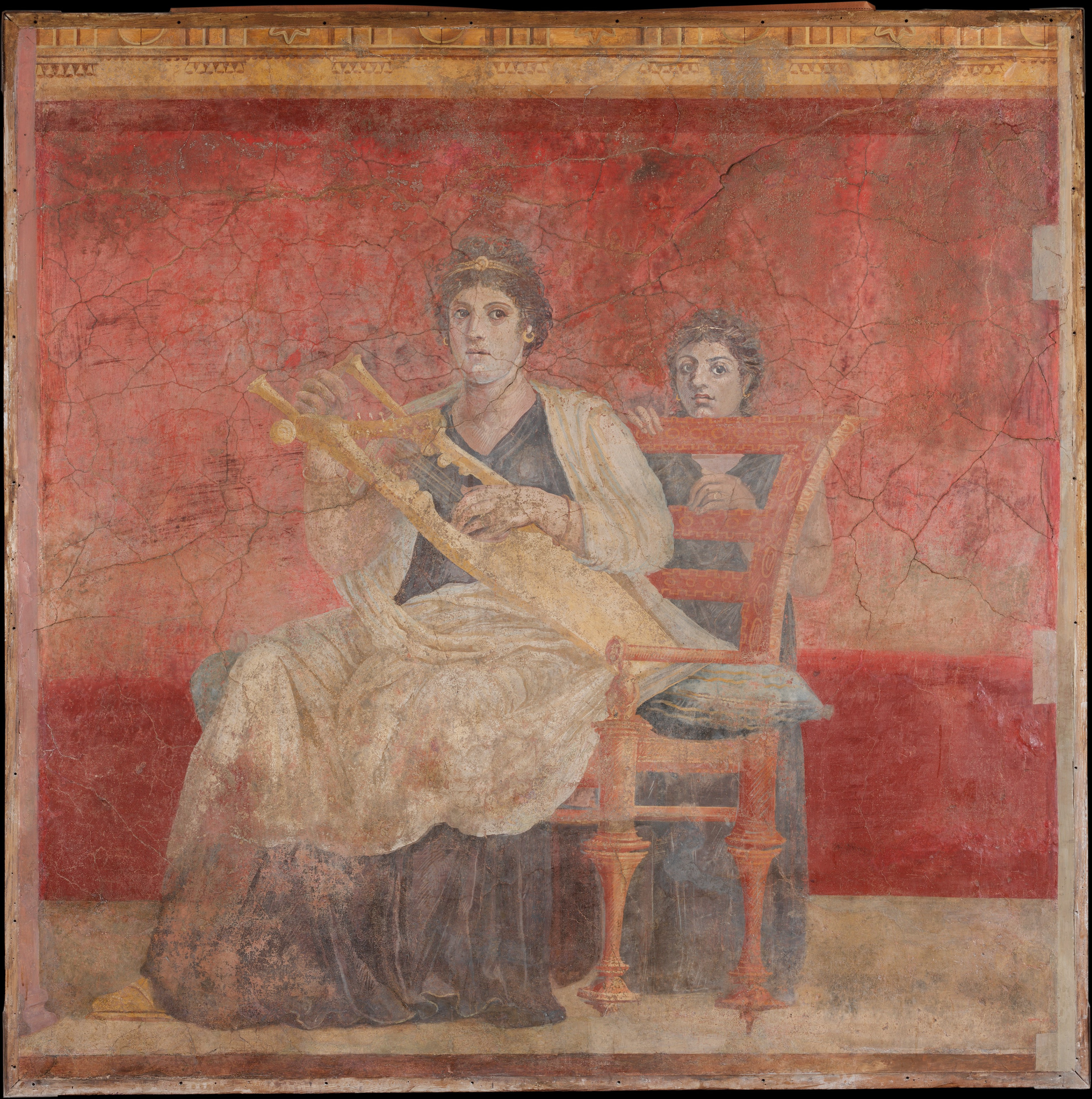
A seated woman in a fresco from the Roman Villa Boscoreale, dated mid-1st century BC. It likely represents Berenice II of Ptolemaic Egypt wearing a stephane (i.e. royal diadem) on her head.

- Ptolemy Keraunos (died 279 BC) – eldest son of Ptolemy I Soter. Eventually became king of Macedonia.
- Ptolemy Apion (died 96 BC) – son of Ptolemy VIII Physcon. Made king of Cyrenaica. Bequeathed Cyrenaica to Rome.
- Ptolemy II of Telmessos, grandson of Ptolemy Epigonos, flourished second half of 3rd century BC and first half of 2nd century BC
- Ptolemy of Cyprus, king of Cyprus c. 80–58 BC, younger brother of Ptolemy XII Auletes
- Alexander Helios (born 40 BC) – elder son of Mark Antony and Cleopatra VII
- Ptolemy Philadelphus (born 36 BC) – younger son of Mark Antony and Cleopatra VII.
- Cleopatra Selene II (40–c.5 BC) – daughter of Cleopatra VII, last Ptolemaic ruler of Cyrenaica, then client queen of Mauretania where she ruled jointly with her husband Juba II at the behest of Rome
- Ptolemy of Mauretania (c. 10 BC–AD 40) – client king and ruler of Mauretania for Rome. Son of King Juba II of Numidia and Mauretania and Cleopatra Selene II, daughter of Cleopatra VII and Mark Antony.

== Health ==
Continuing the tradition established by previous Egyptian dynasties, the Ptolemies engaged in inbreeding including sibling marriage, with many of the pharaohs being married to their siblings and often co-ruling with them. Ptolemy I and other early rulers of the dynasty were not married to their relatives, the childless marriage of siblings Ptolemy II and Arsinoe II being an exception. The first child-producing incestuous marriage in the Ptolemaic dynasty was that of Ptolemy IV and Arsinoe III, who were succeeded as co-pharaohs by their son Ptolemy V, born 210 BC. The best-known Ptolemaic pharaoh, Cleopatra VII, was at different times married to and ruled with two of her brothers (Ptolemy XIII until 47 BC and then Ptolemy XIV until 44 BC), and their parents were also likely to have been siblings or possibly cousins.

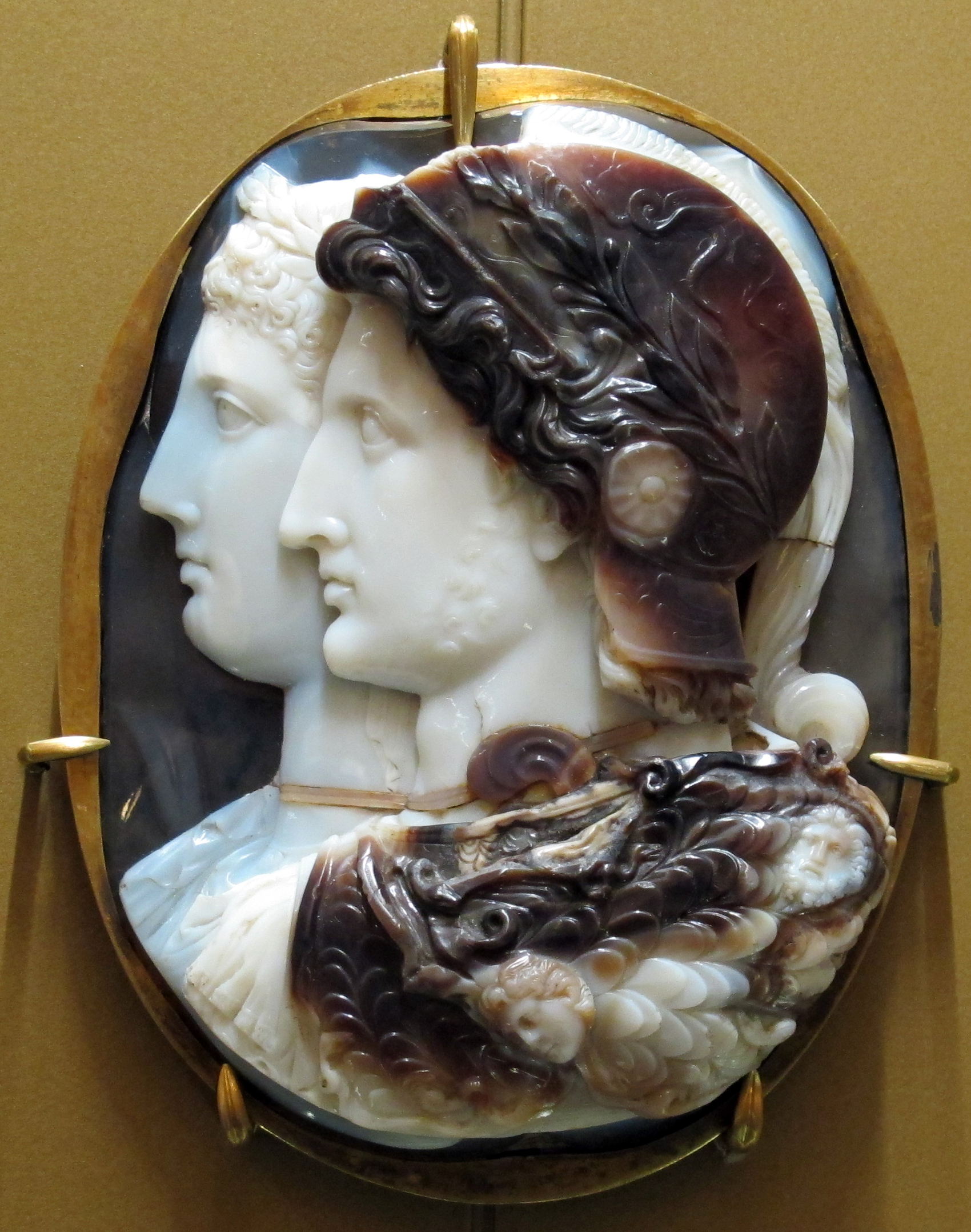
The Gonzaga Cameo of Ptolemy II Philadelphus and Arsinoe II from Alexandria (Hermitage Museum)

Contemporaries describe a number of the Ptolemaic dynasty members as extremely obese, while sculptures and coins reveal prominent eyes and swollen necks. Familial Graves' disease could explain the swollen necks and eye prominence (exophthalmos), although this is unlikely to occur in the presence of morbid obesity. This is all likely due to inbreeding depression. In view of the familial nature of these findings, members of the Ptolemaic dynasty are likely to have suffered from a multi-organ fibrotic condition such as Erdheim–Chester disease, or a familial multifocal fibrosclerosis where thyroiditis, obesity and ocular proptosis may have all occurred concurrently.

== Gallery ==
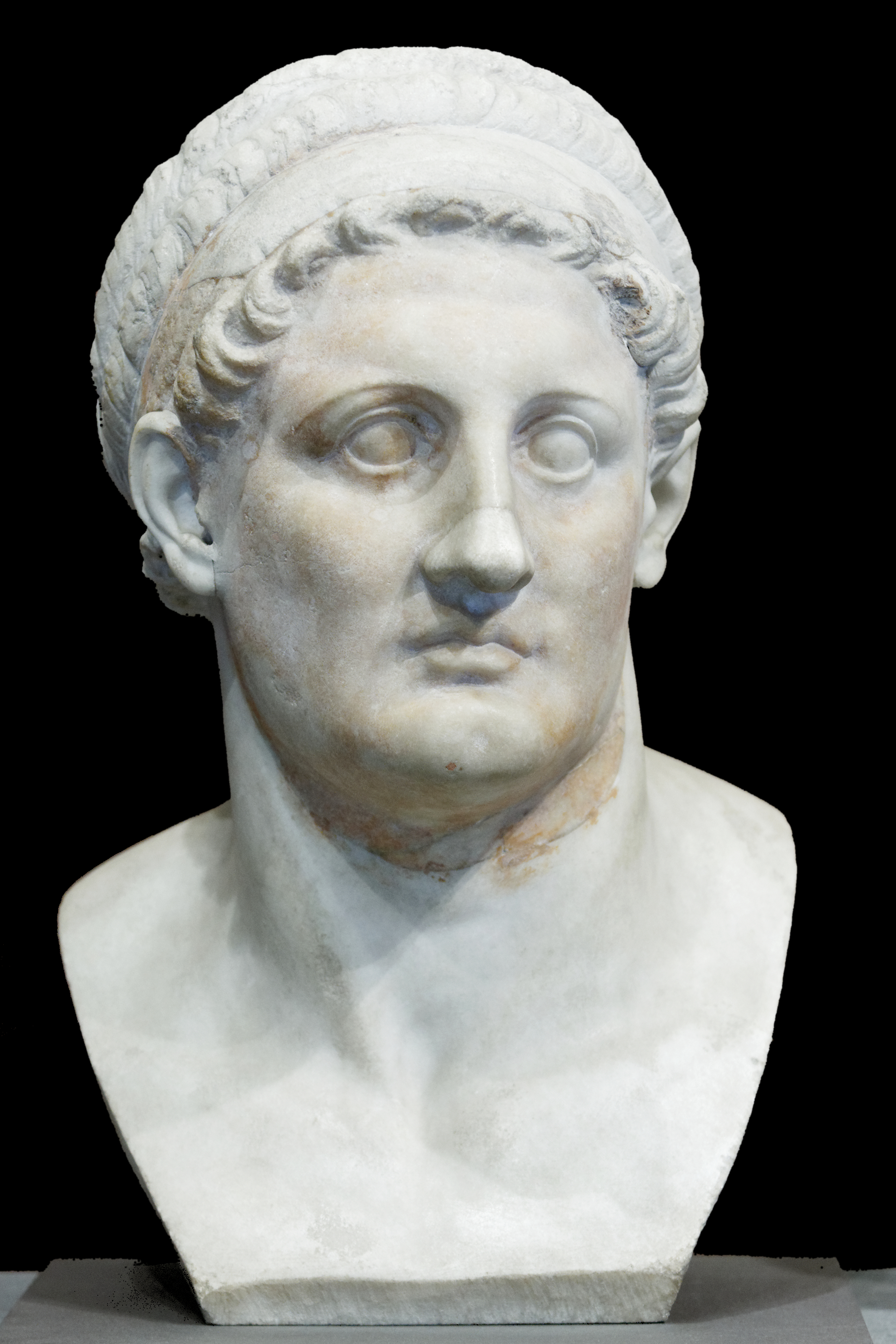
Ptolemy I, founder of the dynasty.

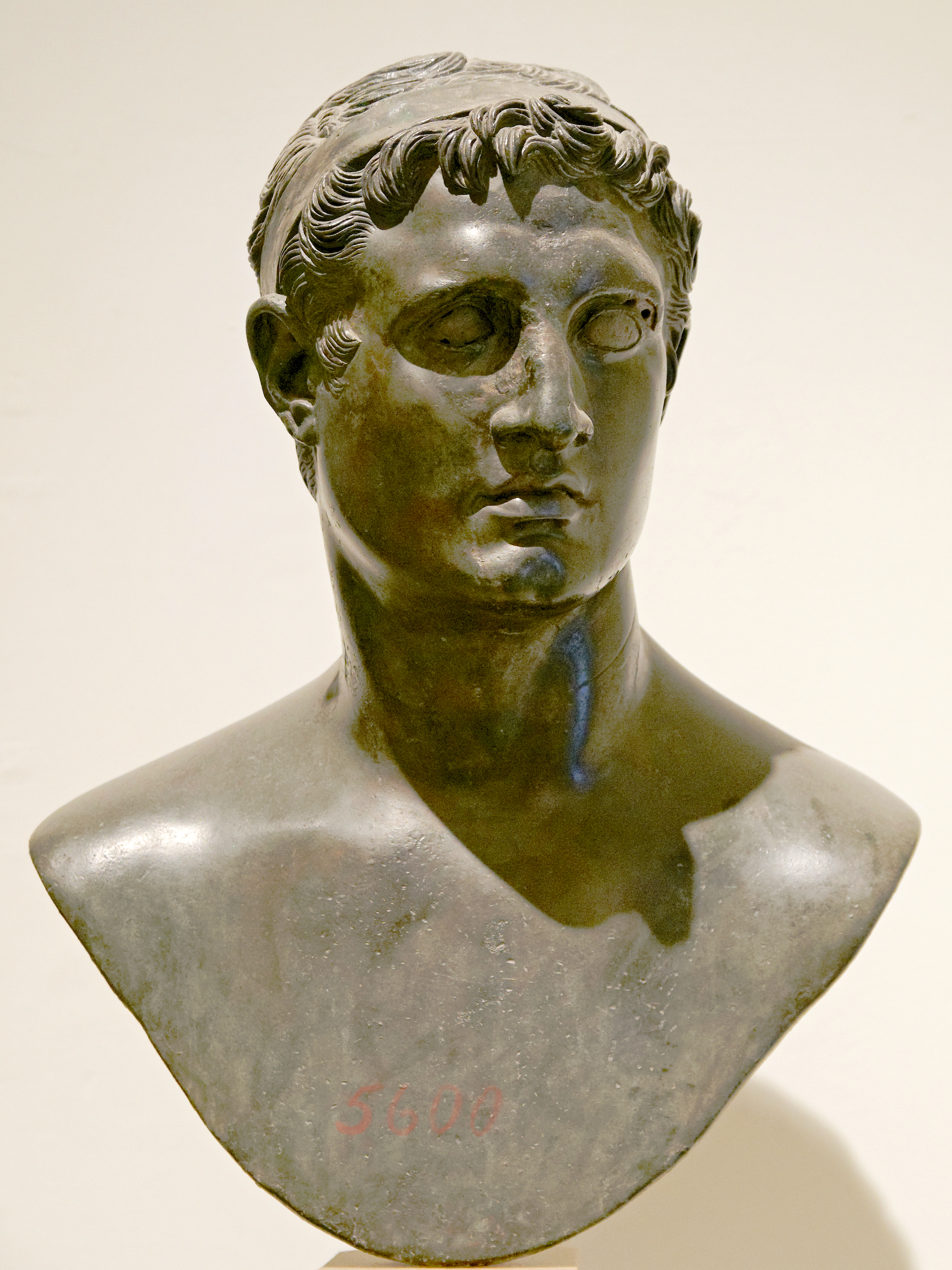
Ptolemy II

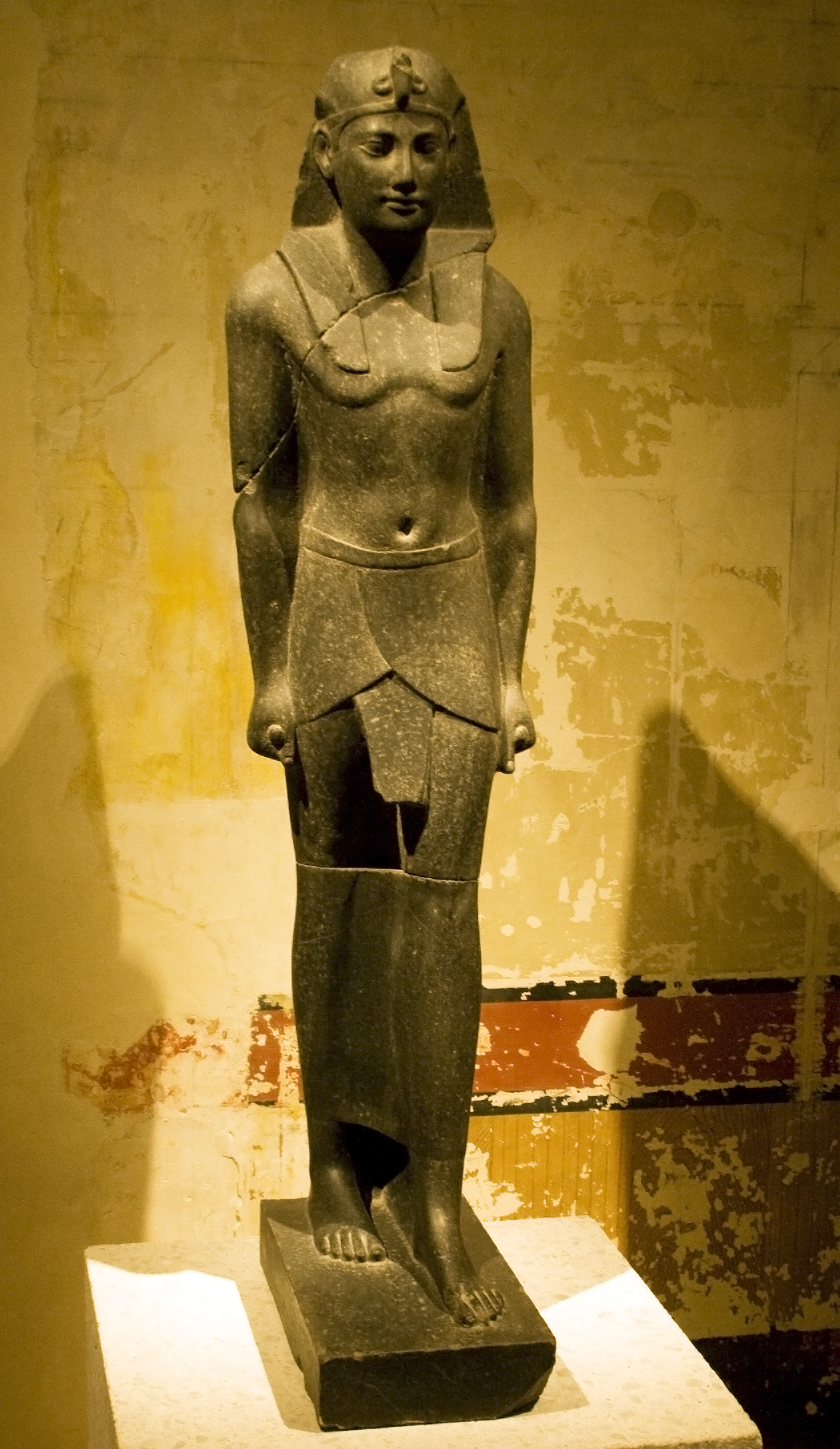
Ptolemy III

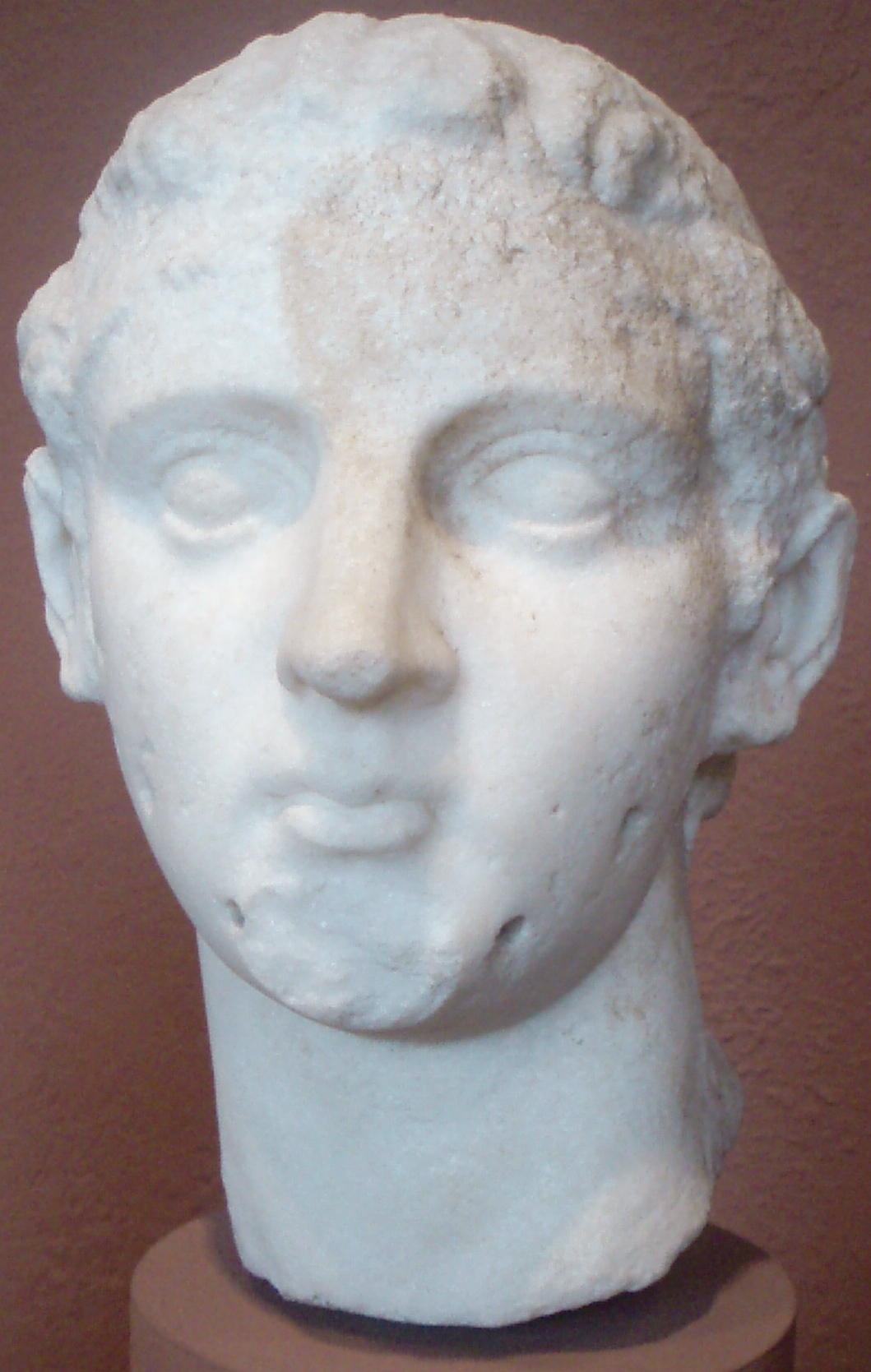
Ptolemy IV

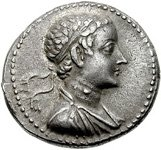
Ptolemy V

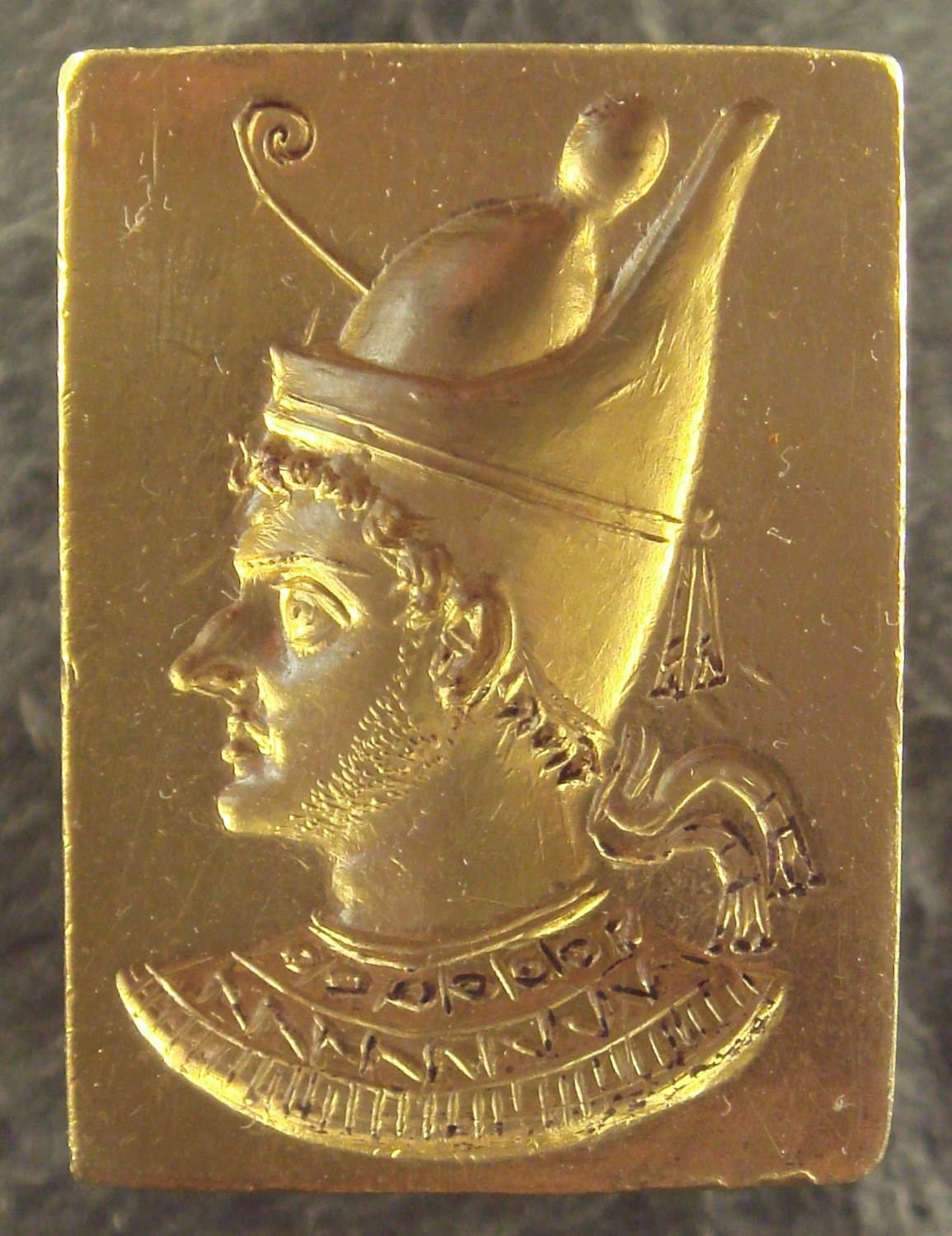
Ptolemy VI

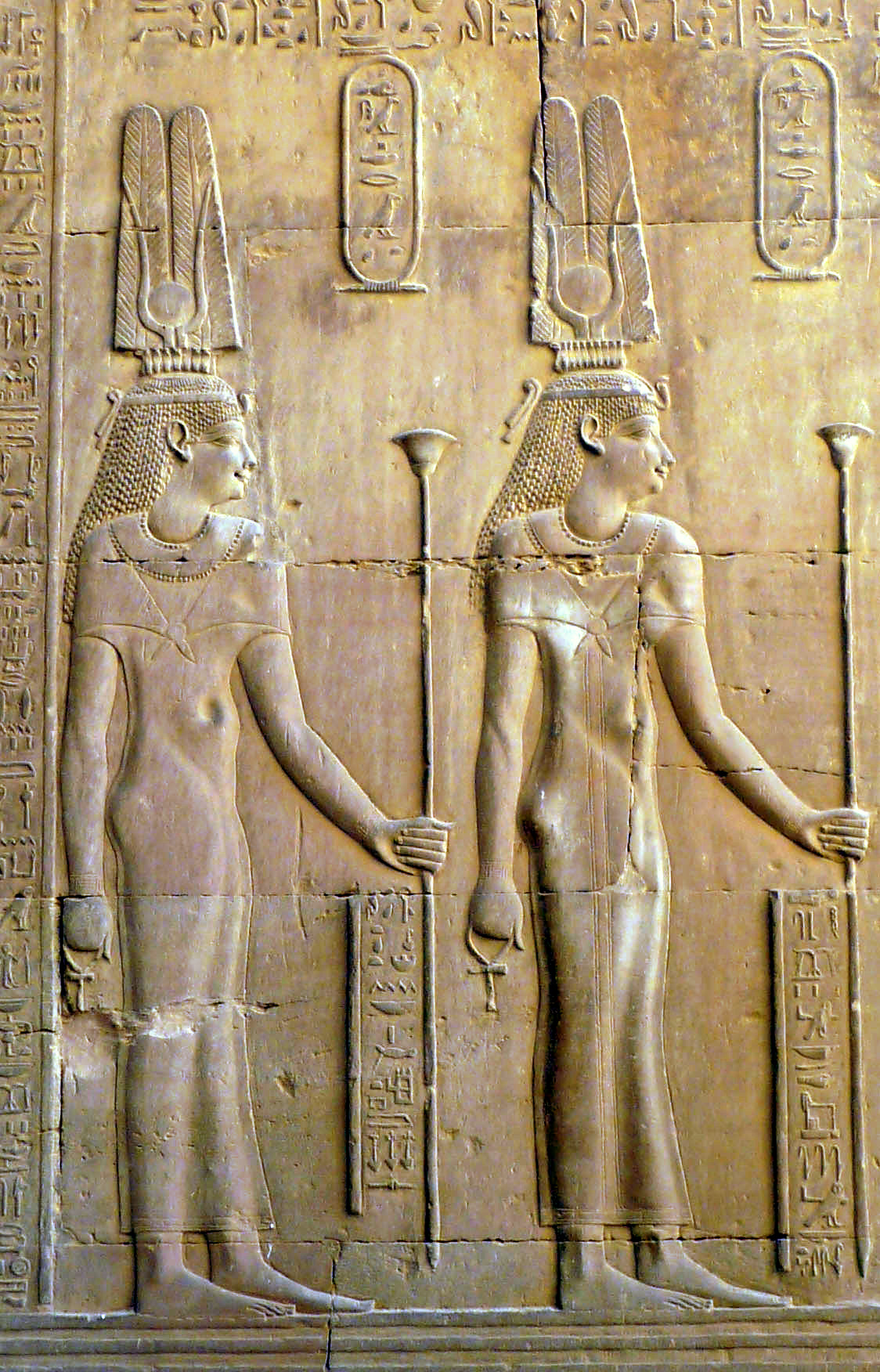
Cleopatra II (right)

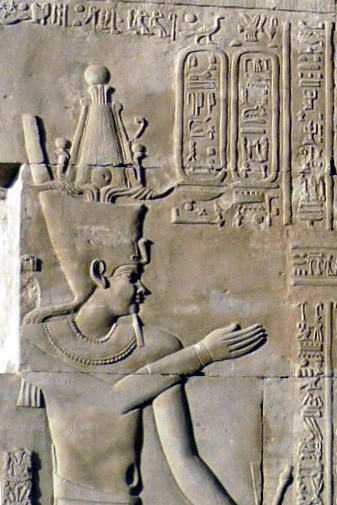
Ptolemy VIII

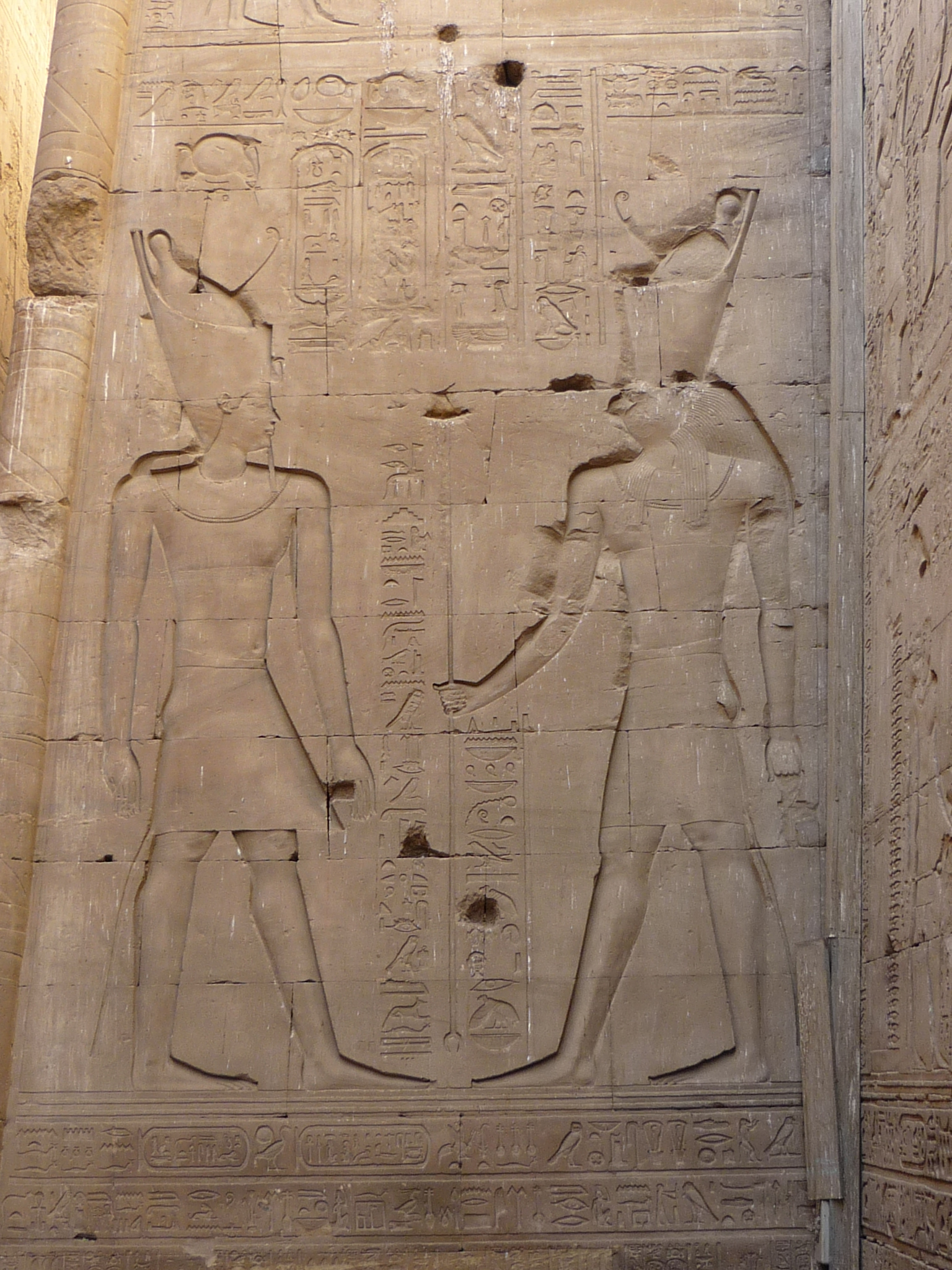
Ptolemy IX

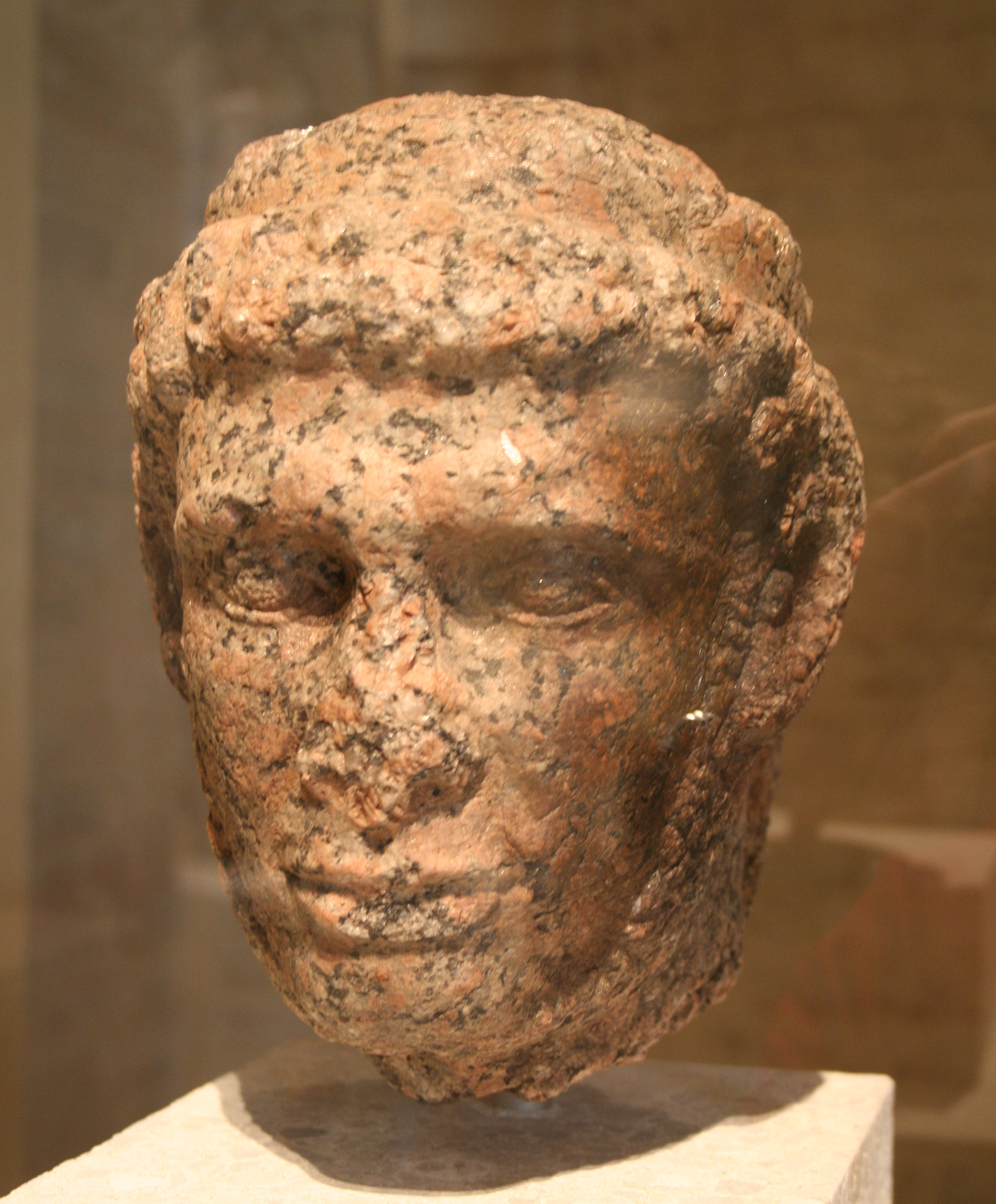
Ptolemy X

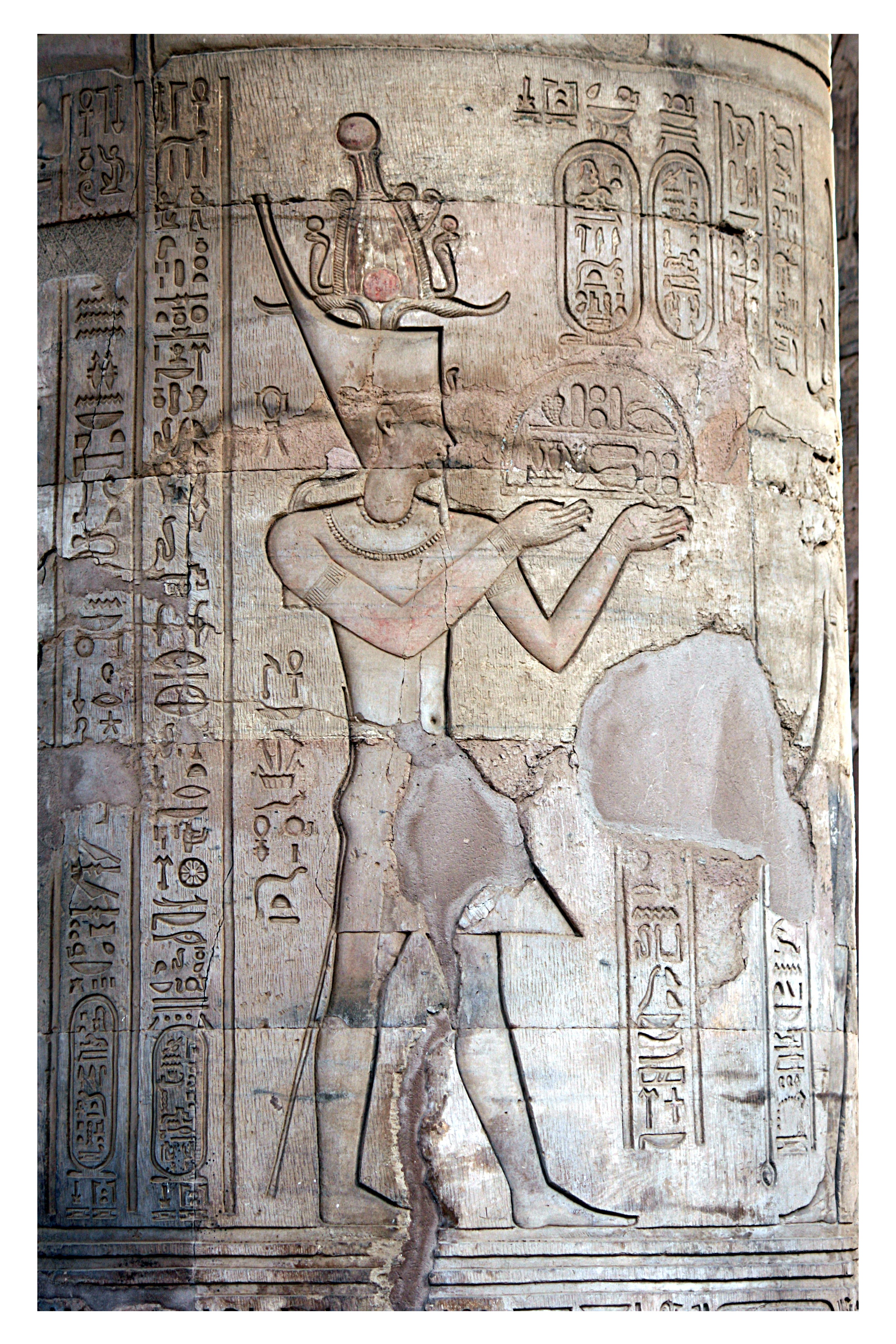
Ptolemy XII

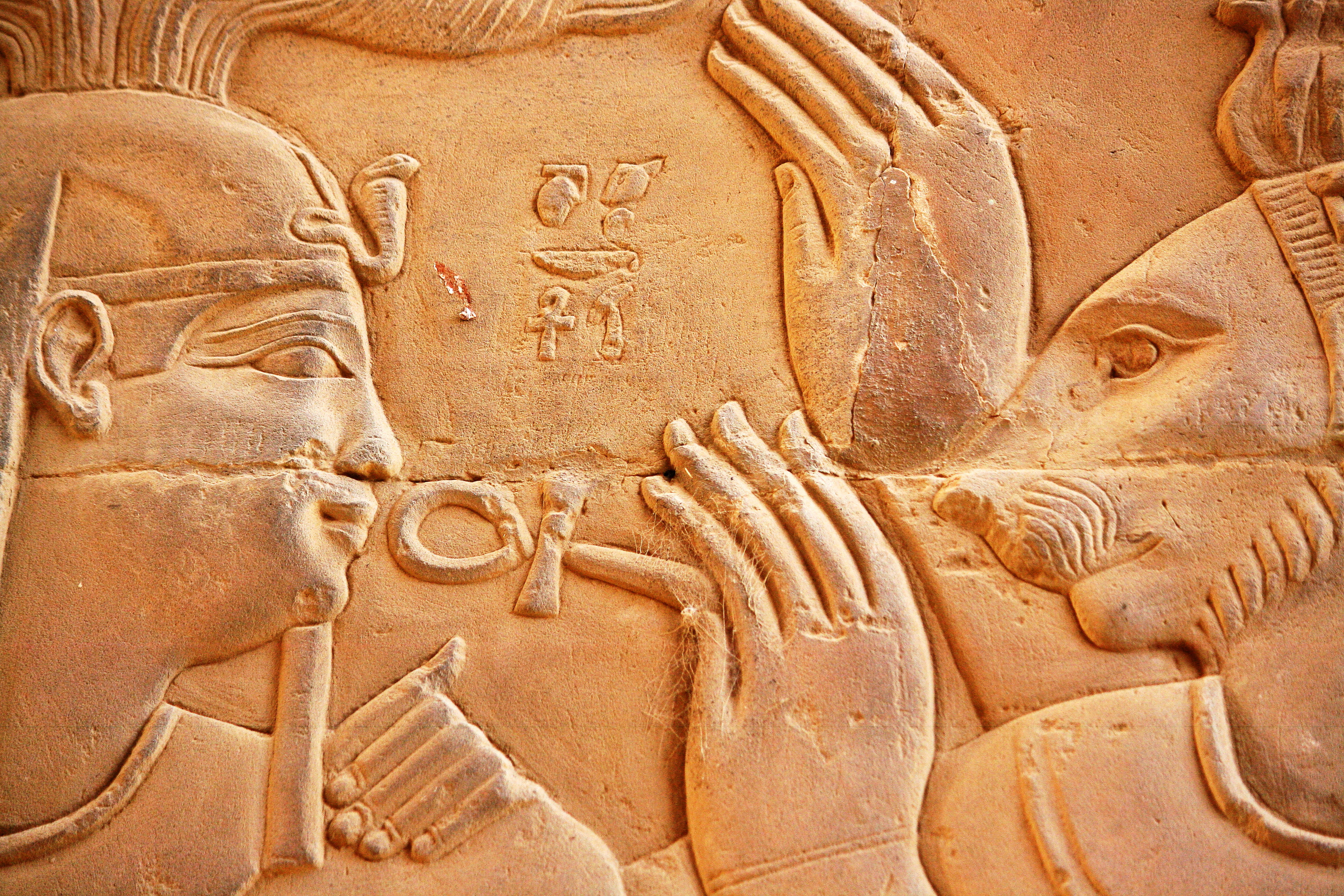
Ptolemy XIII and Sekhmet

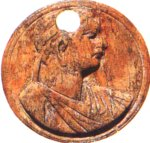
Ptolemy XIV

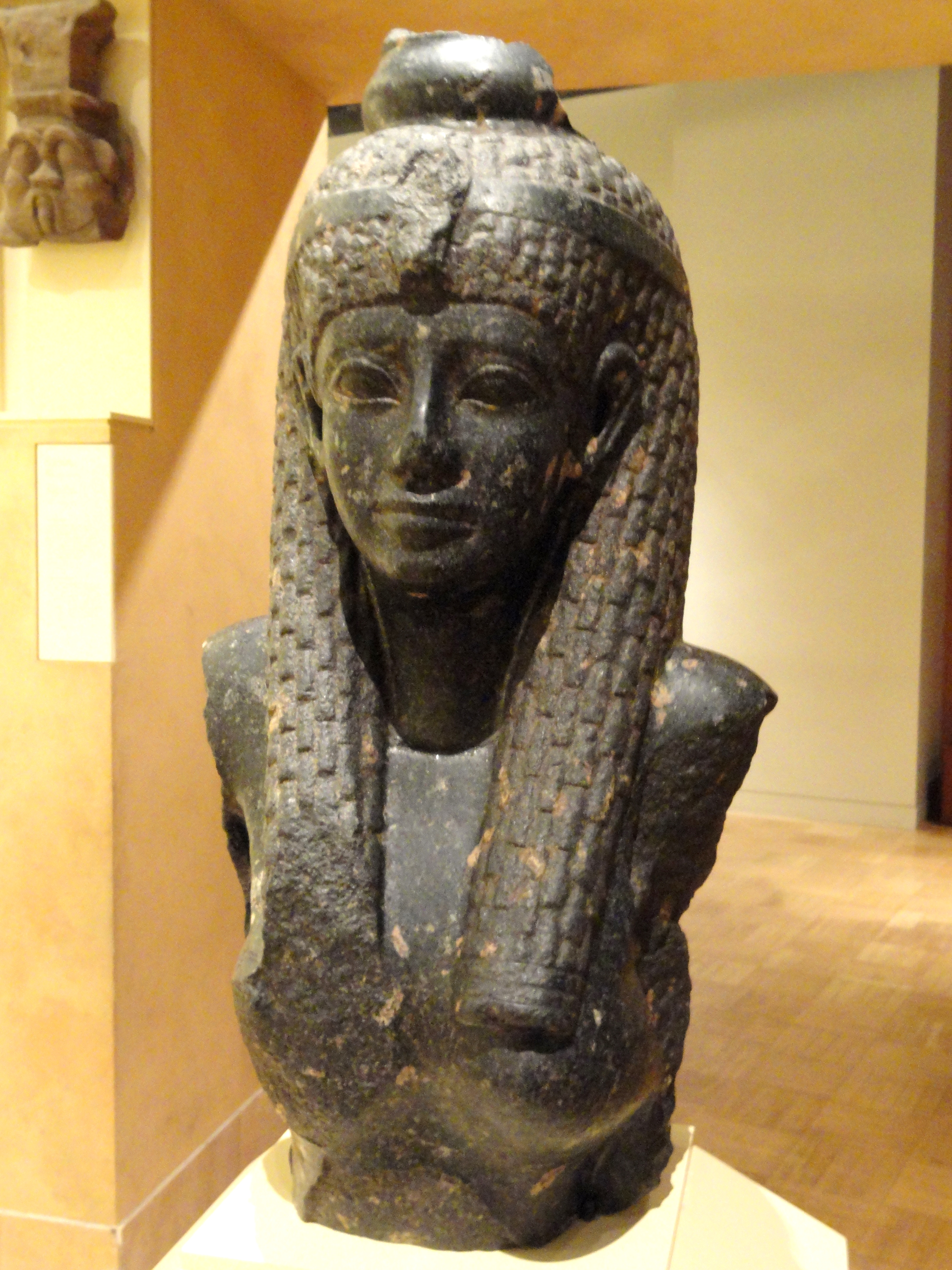
Cleopatra VII

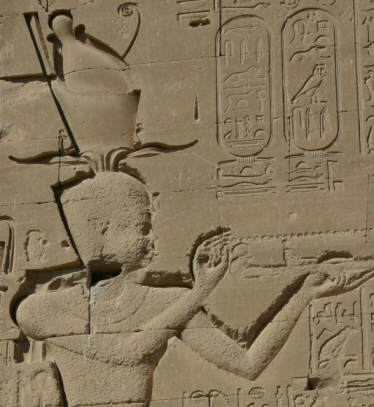
Ptolemy XV, commonly called Caesarion.

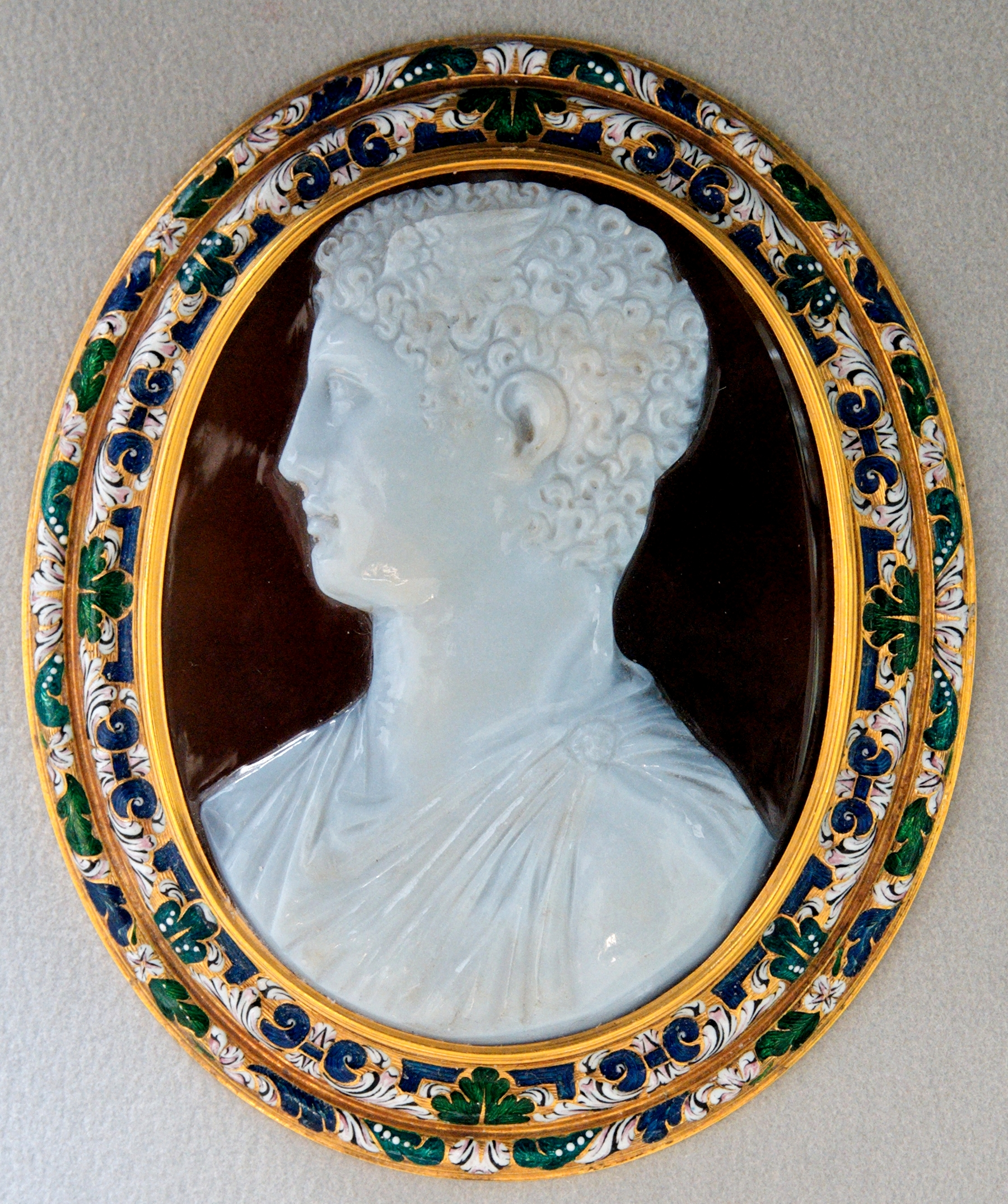
Sardonyx cameo of a Ptolemaic prince as the Greek god Hermes, Cabinet des médailles, Paris.

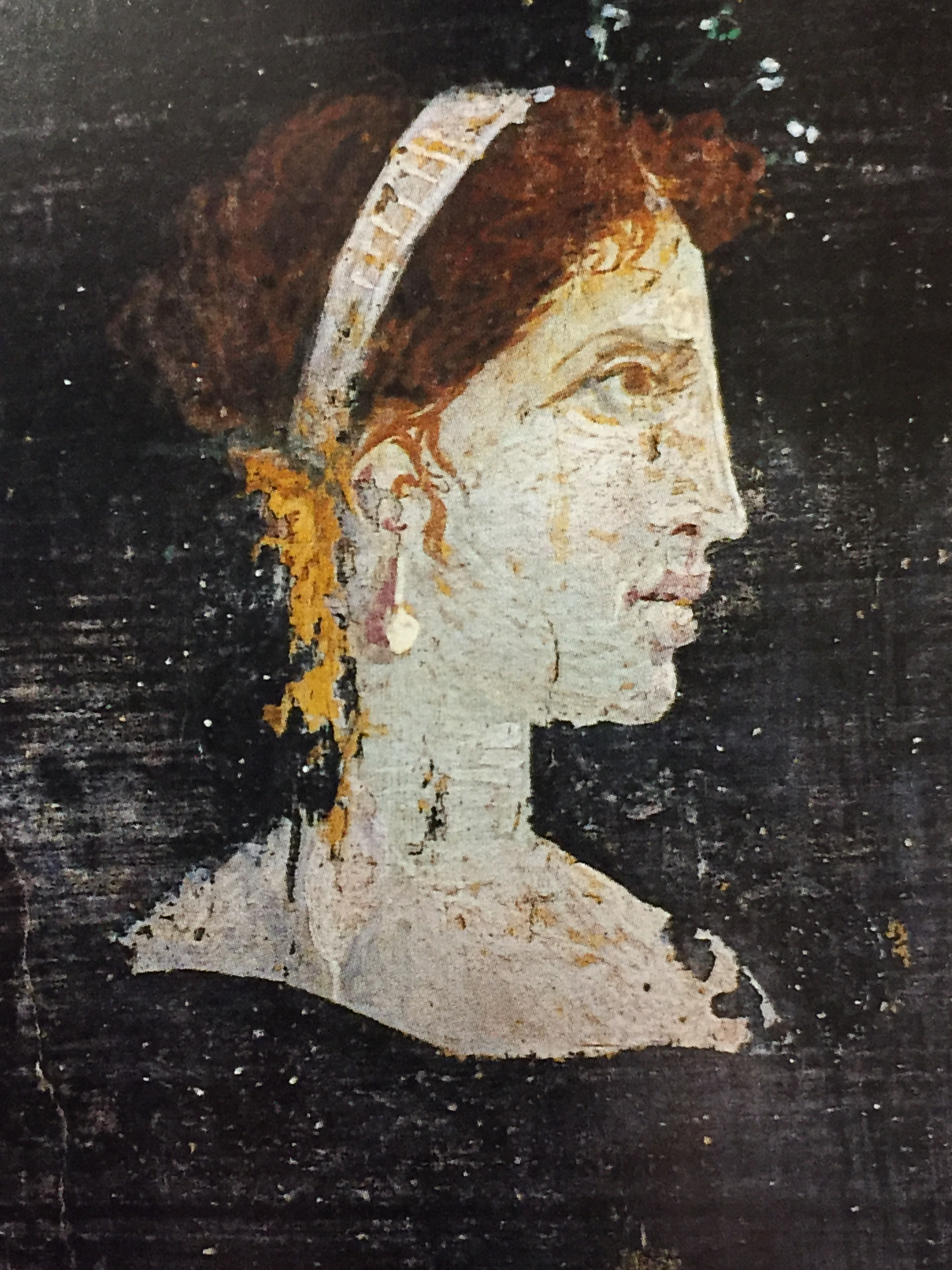
Posthumous portrait of Cleopatra VII, from Roman Herculaneum, mid-1st century AD.

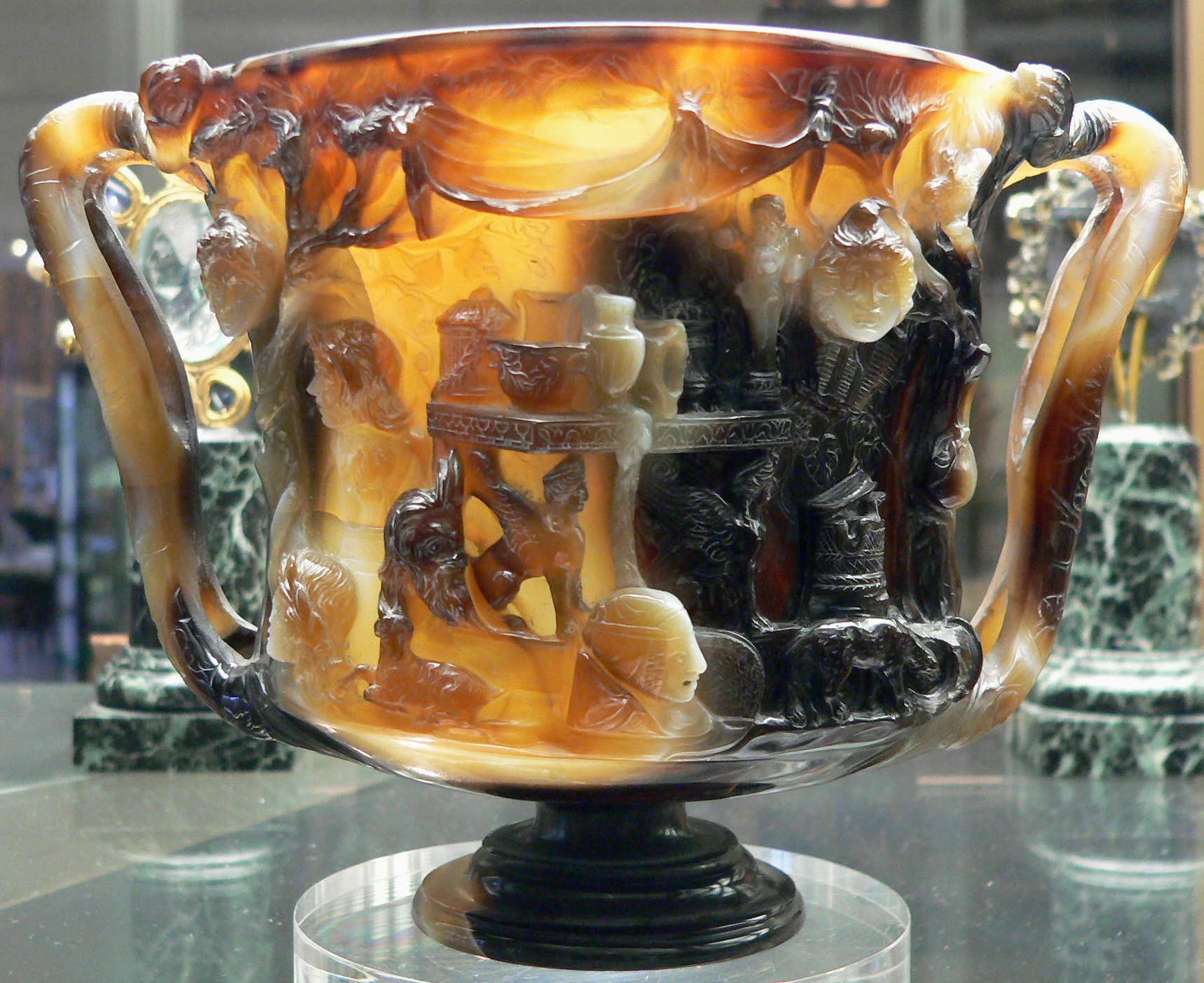
The Cup of the Ptolemies: front (top) of the cup (Cabinet des Médailles)

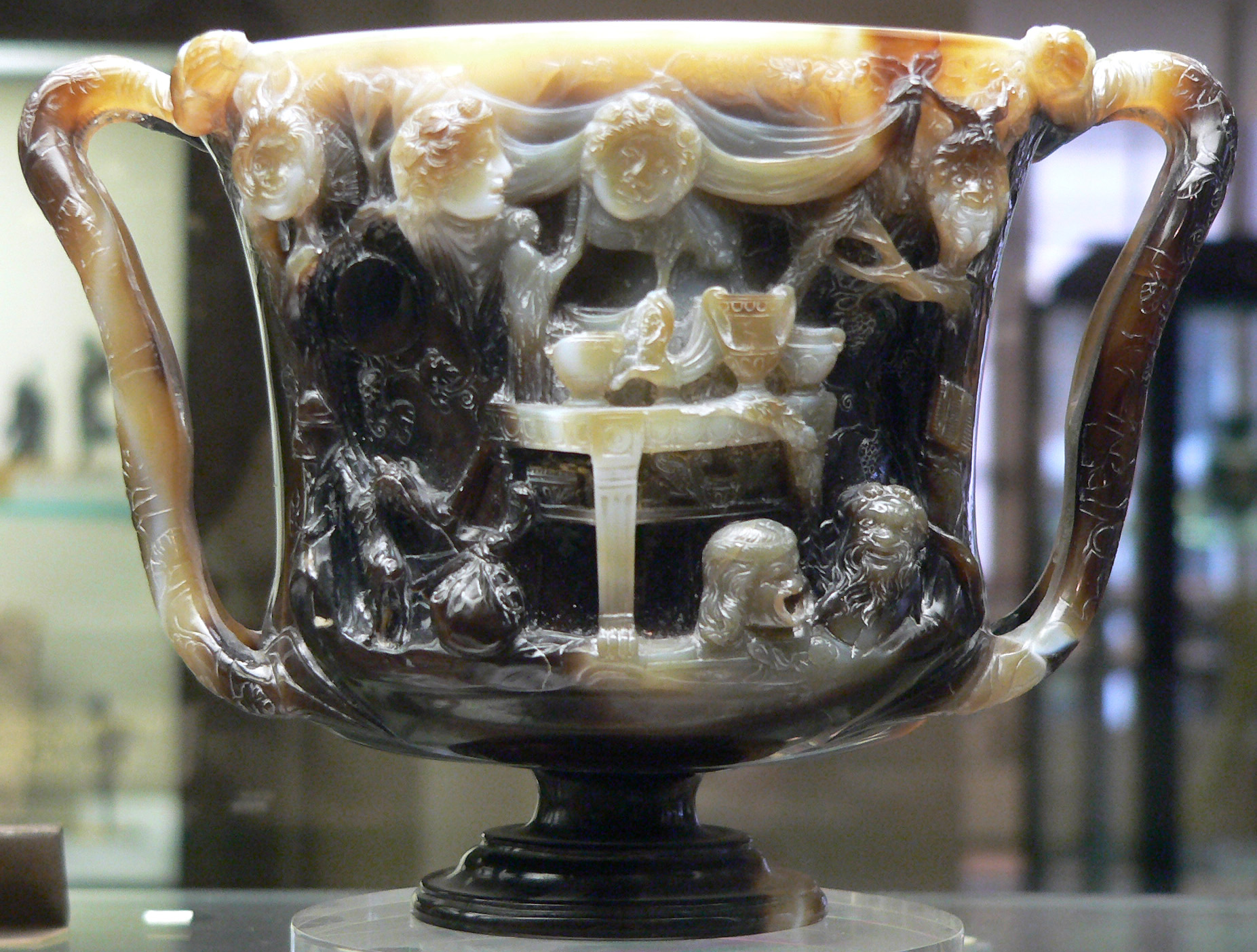
The Cup of the Ptolemies: back (bottom) of the cup (Cabinet des Médailles)

== Timeline ==
Ptolemaic rulers of Egypt

== Family tree ==
Ptolemaic family tree

Lagus of Eordea, Macedon	Arsinoe of Macedon
Ptolemy I Soter (Kg 303–282 BC)	Berenice I	Philip
Arsinoe II	Ptolemy II; Philadelphus (Kg. 285–246 BC)	Arsinoe I	Magas of Cyrene	Apama II
Ptolemy; Epigonos (Kg. 267–259 BC)	Ptolemy III; Euergetes (Kg. 246–221 BC)	Berenice II
Ptolemy IV; Philopator (Kg. 221–203 BC)	Arsinoe III
Ptolemy V Epiphanes (Kg. 203–181 BC)	Cleopatra I Syra
Ptolemy VI; Philometor (Kg. 181–164 BC, 163–145 BC)	Cleopatra II (Qn. 170–127 BC)	Ptolemy VIII; Physcon (Kg. 170–163 BC, 145–116 BC)	Eirene
Ptolemy; Eupator (Kg. 152 BC)	Ptolemy VII; Neos Philopator	Cleopatra III (Qn. 141–131 BC, 127–101 BC)	Ptolemy; Memphites	Ptolemy Apion
Cleopatra IV	Ptolemy IX; Lathyros (Kg. 116–107 BC, as Soter II 88–81 BC)	Cleopatra; Selene	Ptolemy X Alexander I (Kg. 107–88 BC)
Ptolemy XII; Auletes (Kg. 80–58 BC, 55–51 BC)	Berenice III (Qn. 101–88, 81–80 BC)	Ptolemy XI; Alexander II (Kg. 80 BC, for 19 days)
Cleopatra V (Qn. 58–55 BC)
Cleopatra VI (Qn. 58 BC)	Berenice IV (Qn. 58–55 BC)	Ptolemy XIII; Theos Philopator (Kg. 51–47 BC)	Cleopatra VII; Thea Philopator (Qn. 51–30 BC)	Ptolemy XIV (Kg. 47–44 BC)	Arsinoe IV (Qn. 48–47 BC)
Julius; Caesar	Mark; Antony
Ptolemy XV; Caesarion (Kg. 44–30 BC)	Alexander; Helios	Ptolemy; Philadelphus	Cleopatra; Selene II
Ptolemy of Mauretania

Detailed Ptolemaic family tree

Antipater	Lagus	Arsinoe of Macedon
Eurydice	Ptolemy I Soter (Kg 303–282 BC)	Berenice I (∞ Philip ↓ Magas of Cyrene ∞ Apama II ↓ See below: Berenice II)	Lysimachus
Lysandra	Ptolemais	Ptolemy Ceraunus	Arsinoe II	Ptolemy II; Philadelphus (Kg. 285–246 BC)	Arsinoe I
Berenice II of Egypt (daughter of Magas of Cyrene, see above: Berenice I)	Ptolemy III; Euergetes (Kg. 246–221 BC)	Berenice Syra
Antiochus III the Great	Arsinoe III	Ptolemy IV; Philopator (Kg. 221–203 BC)
Cleopatra I Syra	Ptolemy V Epiphanes (Kg. 203–181 BC)
Ptolemy VI; Philometor (Kg. 181–164 BC, 163-145 BC)	Cleopatra II (Qn. 170–127 BC)	Ptolemy VIII; Physcon (Kg. 170–163 BC, 145–116 BC)	Eirene ?
Ptolemy Eupator	Cleopatra Thea	Ptolemy VII; Neos Philopator	Cleopatra III (Qn. 141–131 BC, 127–101 BC)	Ptolemy; Memphites	Ptolemy Apion
Cleopatra Tryphaena	Cleopatra IV	Ptolemy IX; Lathyros (Kg. 116–107 BC, as Soter II 88–81 BC)	Cleopatra Selene I	Ptolemy X Alexander I (Kg. 107–88 BC)
?	Berenice III (Qn. 101–88, 81–80 BC)	Ptolemy XI; Alexander II (Kg. 80 BC, for 19 days)
Ptolemy of Cyprus	Ptolemy XII; Auletes (Kg. 80–58 BC, 55–51 BC)	Cleopatra V (Qn. 58 BC)
Berenice IV (Qn. 58–55 BC)	Ptolemy XIII; Theos Philopator (Kg. 51–47 BC)	Cleopatra VII; Thea Philopator (Qn. 51–30 BC)	Ptolemy XIV (Kg. 47–44 BC)	Arsinoe IV (Qn. 48–47 BC)
Julius; Caesar	Mark; Antony
Ptolemy XV; Caesarion (Kg. 44–30 BC)	Alexander; Helios	Cleopatra; Selene II	Juba II of Mauretania	Ptolemy Philadelphus
Ptolemy of Mauretania

== See also ==
- Argead dynasty, another Greek dynasty in Egypt which ruled immediately prior to the Ptolemies
- Donations of Alexandria
- Hellenistic period
- History of ancient Egypt
- List of pharaohs § Ptolemaic Dynasty
- List of Seleucid rulers
- On Weights and Measures, which contains a chronology of the Ptolemies
- Ptolemaic Decrees
- Roman pharaohs
