= Anrata =

Arata أراعتا
- Location in Eritrea
- Coordinates: 14°41′N 40°58′E
- Country: Eritrea
- Region: Southern Red Sea
- District: Are'eta

Araata (Arabic: أراعتا)Afar af (Arraqta) is a coastal village in eastern Eritrea.

== Location ==
The town is located in the Are'eta district of the Southern Red Sea region. It sits at a latitude of 14° 40' 60N and a longitude of 40° 58' 0E.

Anrata lies 0.6 miles from the district capital of Tiyo, on the southern outskirts of the town.
