= Hando =

Island of Eritrea

- Location within Eritrea

Geography
- Location: Red Sea
- Coordinates: 14.7908°N 40.8067°E
- Area: 2.99 km^{2} (1.15 sq mi)
- Highest elevation: 12 m (39 ft)

Administration
- Eritrea
- Region: Southern Red Sea Region

Hando, also known as Antu Ghebir, Hàmda and Hānda Desēt, is an island of the Southern Red Sea Region of Eritrea.

== Geography ==
Hando is a coastal island located facing the Bay of Anfile of the Red Sea. Smaller Keda Hando lies close to its larger neighbour off its southern shore.
