= Abacheri =

Abacheri أباتشيري
- Location in Eritrea
- Coordinates: 14°11′N 41°30′E
- Country: Eritrea
- Region: Southern Red Sea
- Elevation: 11 m (36 ft)

Population
  - Total: 1.482 million
- Time zone: (GMT+3)
- Postal code: 8824215

Abacheri (Arabic: أباتشيري) is a coastal town in south-eastern Eritrea. It is located by the Red Sea in the Southern Red Sea region.

It was recorded as a settlement as early as 1904.
