= Bay of Beylul =

Bight in Eritrea

- Bēylul Bahir Selat’ē, Badi Bay
- Location in Eritrea
- Coordinates: 13°14′N 42°27′E
- Ocean/sea sources: Red Sea
- Basin countries: Eritrea
- Max. length: 7 km (4.3 mi)
- Max. width: 17 km (11 mi)
- Settlements: Beylul

Bay of Beylul or Bēylul Bahir Selat'ē, also known as Badi Bay, is a bay on the Red Sea, on the coast of Eritrea. The bay is located about 450 km southeast of Asmara.

== Geography ==
The Bay of Beylul is open towards the north and the Hanish Islands lie 50 km to the northeast. The eastern headland is Ras Darma. The settlement of Beylul lies on the western shore of the bay.
