= Arsinoe =

Arsinoe (Ancient Greek: Ἀρσινόη, romanized: Arsinóē), meaning "elevated mind", may refer to:

== People ==
- Arsinoe of Macedon, mother of Ptolemy I Soter
- Apama II or Arsinoe (c. 292 BC–after 249 BC), wife of Magas of Cyrene and mother of Berenice II
- Arsinoe, probable mother of Lysimachus or his first wife Nicaea of Macedon
- Arsinoe I (305 BC–247 BC) of Egypt
- Arsinoe II (316 BC–270 BC) of Egypt
- Arsinoe III of Egypt (c. 246 BC–204 BC)
- Arsinoe IV of Egypt (died 41 BC), half-sister of Cleopatra VII
- Arsinoe (mythology), name of multiple Greek mythological figures

== Places ==
- Arsinoe (Cilicia)
- Arsinoe (Crete)
- Arsinoe (Northwest Cyprus)
- Arsinoe (Southwest Cyprus)
- Arsinoe (Gulf of Suez), a port of Egypt
- Arsinoe (Eritrea)
- Conope (Greece) or Arsinoe
- Ephesus, also called Arsinoe
- Faiyum (Egypt), also called Arsinoe or Crocodilopolis, seat of the Roman Catholic titular bishopric Arsinoë in Arcadia
- Famagusta (Cyprus) or Arsinoe
- Coressia (Greece), called Arsinoe in the Hellenistic period
- Methana (Greece), called Arsinoe in the Ptolemaic period
- Olbia (Egypt) or Arsinoe
- Patara (Lycia) or Arsinoe
- Taucheira (Libya) or Arsinoe
- Arsinoes Chaos, located in the Margaritifer Sinus quadrangle on Mars

== Literature ==
- Arsinoe, a character in Le Misanthrope by Molière
- Arsinoe, a character in The Etruscan by Mika Waltari
- Arsinoe, a character in Three Dark Crowns by Kendare Blake
- Arsinoe, Queen of Cyprus, a 1705 English opera

== Other uses ==
- Arsinoe (beetle), a genus of beetles in the family Carabidae
- 404 Arsinoë, an asteroid

== See also ==
- Arsinoi, a community in Messenia
