= Assab =

Port city in Southern Red Sea, Eritrea

Assab ዓሰብ
- City
- Church of St. Michael, Assab

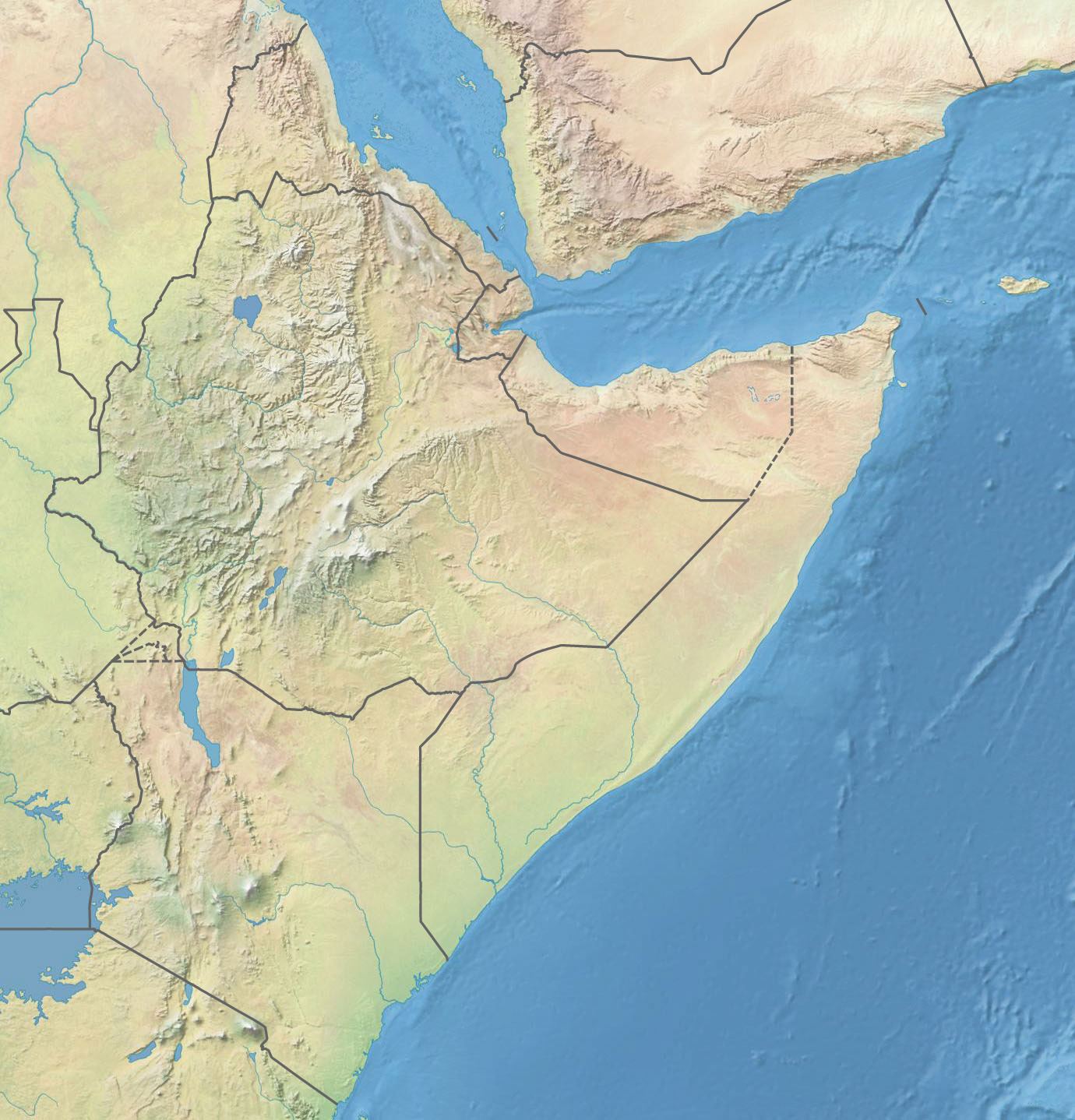
- Location within Eritrea Location within the Horn of Africa Location within Africa
- Coordinates: 13°00′28″N 42°44′28″E
- Country: Eritrea
- Region: Southern Red Sea
- District: Southern Denkalya
- Elevation: 16 m (52 ft)

Population (2005)
  - Total: 20,222
- Time zone: UTC+03:00 (EAT)
- Climate: BWh

Assab or Aseb (Tigrinya: ዓሰብ, Arabic: عصب) is a port city in the Southern Red Sea Region of Eritrea situated on the west coast of the Red Sea. Languages spoken in Assab are predominantly Afar, Tigrinya, and Arabic. It was founded as a port in 1882 by the Rubattino Company; when the Italian government took control of the port in 1882, it laid the foundations for the formation of the colony of Italian Eritrea, which became the independent country of Eritrea following its independence from Ethiopia in the 1990s.

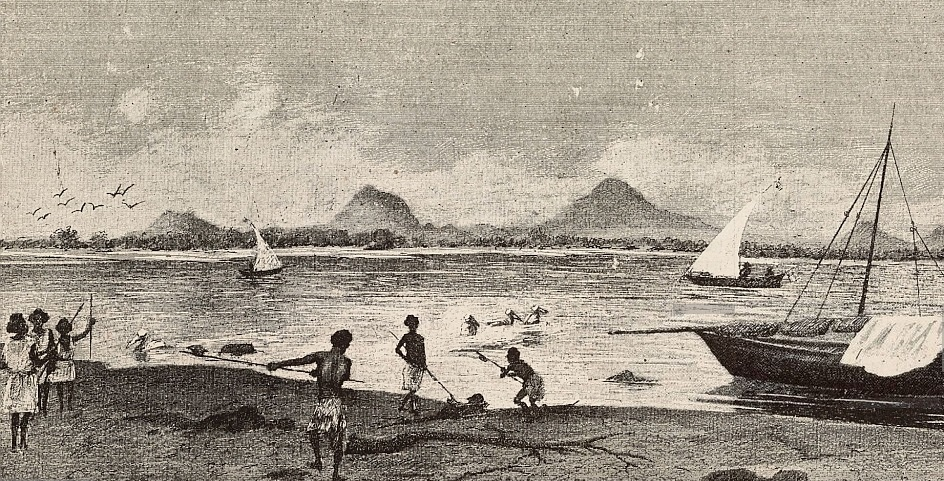
Natives fishing in the vicinity of Assab, Eritrea, engraving from a sketch by G.B Licata, March 15, 1885.

== History ==
Assab is about 50 kilometres (31 mi) northwest of the ancient city of Arsinoe Epidires.

=== 19th century ===
Assab had limited contact with the hinterland, and until the middle of the 19th century it was nothing more than a tiny Afar fishing village with a population of only 100 people and twenty huts. It gained considerable attention on 15 November 1869 when the Bay of Assab was bought by the Italian missionary Giuseppe Sapeto on behalf of the Rubattino Shipping Company. Upon reaching the Bay of Assab, Sapeto found two sultans, the brothers Hasan ibn Ahmed and Ibrahim ibn Ahmed, who were both willing to sell the port for 6,000 Maria Theresa thalers. Sapeto justified his purchase by claiming that the port was ideally situated for Italy due to its proximity to the Bab-el-Mandeb and he also argued that the port, though nominally under the vassalage of the sultan of Aussa, was in fact its own independent polity. Nevertheless, the purchase received considerable controversy in Italy where it was opposed by both the press and the parliament but also attracted strong condemnation by the Egyptians who declared the sale to be illegal.

The Italian government, impressed by the possibility of developing a port for access to Ethiopia further inland, seized control of the area in 1882 and took steps to open up the route inland to Shewa. Count Pietro Antonelli, the Italian envoy to Menelik II, signed a contract with the Ethiopian ruler, agreeing to supply him with 2,000 Remington rifles which were imported via Assab. Antonelli also visited Aussa in 1883 where he was able to befriend the Afar sultan, Muhammad Hanfari and he convinced him to sign a treaty of commerce with the Italian government. As a result, the trade between Assab and Shewa soon expanded and by the end of the following year Antonelli was able to bring in 50,000 rifles and 10 million cartridges in exchange for 600 camels bearing gold, ivory and civet.

In 1884, the port was visited by the Italian traveler G. B. Licata who estimated the population to be 111 Afars, 140 Arabs, 43 Italians, 12 Abyssinians and 10 Somalis. Despite still being a small settlement, Assab was regarded as a place of promise, Licata described it emotionally in 1884 as the beginning of "great things to come. Beautiful for what it will be when Italy will have made it in truth a colony; it is pleasing in fact because it is a young thing, and touching as an Italian thing."

Following the occupation of Massawa in 1885, the settlement declined. The occupation of the more northernly town provided the Italians with a much larger port that gave them easier access to Ethiopia. The port's firearm trade with Shewa also broke down due to the outbreak of hostilities with Menelik II. After the disastrous Battle of Adwa, Assab was largely forgotten and the Italians concentrated their interest on Massawa.

=== 20th century ===
By the early years of the 20th century, the port of Assab had been rendered redundant. Ethiopia, suspicious of Italy, preferred to do business with the French at Djibouti. The completion of the Ethio-Djibouti Railways led to further decline in trade passing through Assab. In the absence of any significant trade from the inland, the settlement depended on salt production which was exported to Japan, as well as some nearby date plantations. The population during this time period was estimated to be between 1,000 and 3,000 inhabitants with 100 to 140 Italians.

A 1922 British War Office report stated that the settlement was no more than a small village and consisted of "less than a hundred round grass huts of the native population with a few European built houses and a modest custom house". The rise of fascism seems to have made an impression as the British traveller Hermann Norden observes "even without a sight of the flag from the Government buildings the traveller would know he was in an Italian possession, for the black children in the winding lanes give the fascist salute".

After the Second Italo-Ethiopian War the development of Assab was given a new impetus by the building of a road to Dessie and the reconstruction of the port. Assab was one of the last Italian holdouts to surrender to the Allies during the East African Campaign. Assab was seized on 11 June 1941 by the 3/15th Punjab Regiment, which captured its entire garrison including its commander, Pietro Piacentini.

After Eritrea's federation with Ethiopia in 1952 (and incorporation in 1962), Assab became an important port of entry for the southern and central parts of the country. Assab was further expanded by construction work, with aid from the Soviet Union and Yugoslavia during the reign of Haile Selassie I. Construction of an oil refinery began in 1964, and it opened in 1967. This development motivated a large number of Ethiopian immigrants from Tigray and Wollo, to seek jobs as dock workers or work in the salt and fishing industries. The Derg military regime was eager to detach Assab from the rest of Eritrea administratively, especially as nationalist sentiments among the Afar began to grow in the 1970s. Ethiopian trade in Assab increased to over 60% as war in other parts of Eritrea made other ports unsuitable. By 1989, Assab had a population of 39,600 inhabitants. The oil refinery was shut down for economic reasons in 1997. Ethiopia used Assab as the port for two-thirds of its trade with the world until the Eritrean–Ethiopian War broke out in 1998. Borders between Eritrea and Ethiopia closed and trade with Ethiopia ceased. The port and the port town declined and by 2005 the population had dropped to an estimated 20,222 inhabitants.

=== 21st century ===
In 2008, following a border dispute with neighbouring Djibouti and consequently an unsafe border between the countries, which saw forces from Qatar acting as mediators in a buffer zone, the role of Assab diminished further.

Beginning in 2015, the United Arab Emirates built a port and expanded an airstrip in Assab using the facility as a base to support the Saudi-led intervention in the Yemeni civil war.

During the Tigray War, the Tigray People's Liberation Front (TPLF) accused Ethiopia of deploying drones from a military base in Assab belonging to the United Arab Emirates.

== Infrastructure ==
Assab is served by Assab International Airport. The United Arab Emirates reportedly uses the port and airport for logistics, and as a detention centre.

== Climate ==
Assab has the typical hot desert climate (Köppen climate classification BWh) of the Danakil Region. The city's climate is arid and extremely hot, with an extremely low average annual rainfall of 40 mm (1.57 in). Assab experiences high temperatures during both the day and the night, with the annual mean average temperature approaching 31 °C (87.8 °F).

Climate data for Assab (1961–1990, extremes 1937–1990)
Month	Jan	Feb	Mar	Apr	May	Jun	Jul	Aug	Sep	Oct	Nov	Dec	Year
Record high °C (°F)	37.0 (98.6)	37.0 (98.6)	40.0 (104.0)	43.0 (109.4)	43.2 (109.8)	46.2 (115.2)	49.0 (120.2)	48.4 (119.1)	46.8 (116.2)	43.0 (109.4)	39.0 (102.2)	36.5 (97.7)	49.0 (120.2)
Mean daily maximum °C (°F)	31.3 (88.3)	31.7 (89.1)	33.8 (92.8)	36.0 (96.8)	37.0 (98.6)	38.5 (101.3)	41.2 (106.2)	40.9 (105.6)	38.1 (100.6)	36.5 (97.7)	33.9 (93.0)	31.6 (88.9)	35.5 (95.9)
Daily mean °C (°F)	26.3 (79.3)	26.7 (80.1)	28.5 (83.3)	30.5 (86.9)	32.0 (89.6)	33.1 (91.6)	35.0 (95.0)	34.6 (94.3)	32.9 (91.2)	31.2 (88.2)	28.8 (83.8)	26.9 (80.4)	30.5 (86.9)
Mean daily minimum °C (°F)	21.3 (70.3)	21.7 (71.1)	23.2 (73.8)	25.1 (77.2)	27.0 (80.6)	28.5 (83.3)	30.3 (86.5)	29.9 (85.8)	28.5 (83.3)	26.0 (78.8)	23.7 (74.7)	22.2 (72.0)	25.6 (78.1)
Record low °C (°F)	11.9 (53.4)	12.4 (54.3)	13.7 (56.7)	14.0 (57.2)	14.4 (57.9)	17.5 (63.5)	19.6 (67.3)	19.9 (67.8)	16.0 (60.8)	15.0 (59.0)	14.5 (58.1)	12.1 (53.8)	11.9 (53.4)
Average rainfall mm (inches)	4.0 (0.16)	6.7 (0.26)	1.8 (0.07)	3.6 (0.14)	1.7 (0.07)	0.2 (0.01)	6.9 (0.27)	2.8 (0.11)	1.1 (0.04)	1.0 (0.04)	4.5 (0.18)	4.8 (0.19)	39.1 (1.54)
Average rainy days (≥ 1.0 mm)	1	1	0	0	0	0	1	0	0	0	0	0	3
Average relative humidity (%)	62	68	61	54	58	57	50	54	62	54	55	61	58
Average dew point °C (°F)	18.4 (65.1)	20.3 (68.5)	20.2 (68.4)	20.1 (68.2)	22.7 (72.9)	23.4 (74.1)	23.0 (73.4)	23.9 (75.0)	24.6 (76.3)	20.8 (69.4)	18.8 (65.8)	18.7 (65.7)	21.2 (70.2)
Source 1: NOAA, Deutscher Wetterdienst (humidity, 1937–1970)
Source 2: Meteo Climat (record highs and lows)
