= Arsinoe (Eritrea) =

Ancient city near modern Assab, Eritrea

Coordinates: 12.70986°N 43.13109°E

Arsinoe (Ancient Greek: Ἀρσινόη), sometimes called Arsinoe Epidires, was an ancient city of the Avalitæ, at Dire promontory in Eritrea, north of Berenice Epideires, and near the entrance of the Red Sea (Bab-el-Mandeb). The city was founded by Ptolemy II and named for Arsinoe II of Egypt, his wife and sister. Its location is near the modern-day city of Assab, in Eritrea.
