= Giuseppe Sapeto =

Italian priest, linguist, and colonial agent (1811–1895)

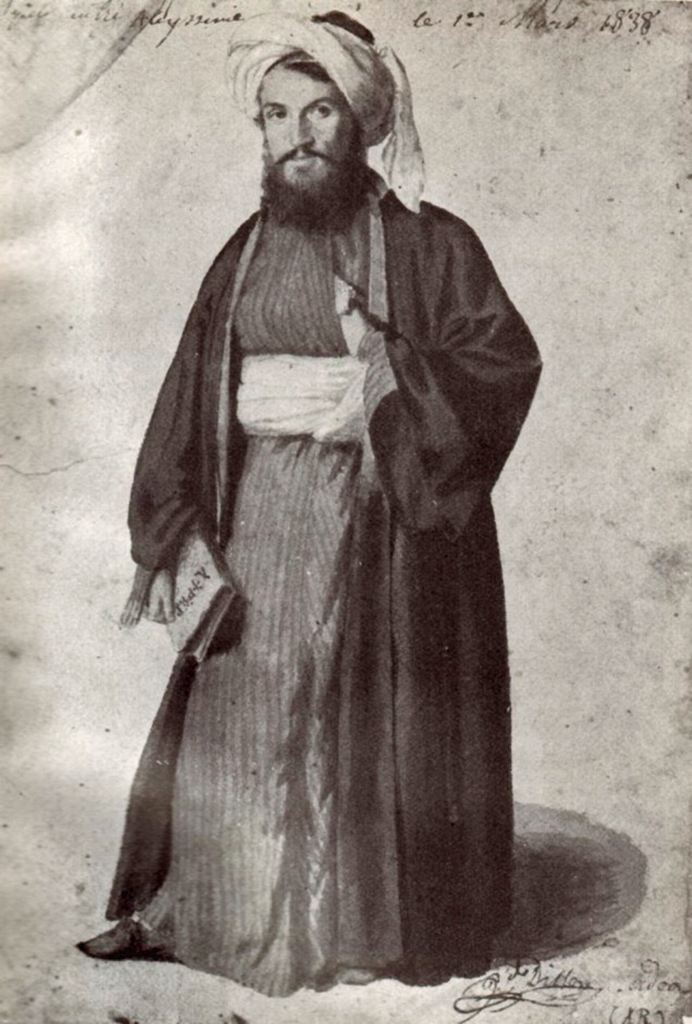
- Giuseppe Sapeto (1838)
- Born: 1811; Carcare, Genoa, French Empire (now Italy)
- Died: 24 August 1895 (aged 83–84); Genoa, Kingdom of Italy
- Occupations: Priest; linguist; explorer; colonial agent
- Organizations: Order of Saint Lazarus
- Known for: Acquisition of Assab Bay; Italian colonial expansion

Giuseppe Sapeto (1811 – 24 August 1895) was an Italian priest, linguist, and colonial agent as well as a member of the Order of San Lazaro who traveled the shores of the Red Sea and was one of the proponents of Italian colonial expansionism.

== Early life ==
Sapeto was born in 1811 in Carcare, Genoa.

== Career ==
In 1837, Giuseppe Sapeto settled in Adwa and wrote some works on Eritrea and Abyssinia. Between 1851 and 1855 he traveled, together with Father Giovanni Giacinto Stella, among the peoples of the Mensâs, the Bogos and the Hababs, following which he published an account of the places the pair journeyed to. Following this initial African adventure, he later he taught the Arabic language in Paris, Florence and Genoa.

In 1862, Sapeto returned to Africa, and in November 1869 he bought the bay of Assab on behalf of Raffaele Rubattino's shipping company, which with the transfer to the Kingdom of Italy in 1882 would become the first Italian colonial possession, and was the stepping stone for Italian expansion into Eritrea.

As a representative of the Rubattino Company, he assisted in the first logistical phases of the Assab settlement, under the guidance of Captain De Amezaga, up until the appointment of Gustavo Branchi as Italian Commissioner of Assab. He left Assab in December 1880, never to return.

== Death and legacy ==
He died 24 August 1895 in Genoa.

The city of Genoa, where he died, and Rome both have streets named after him in the San Martino district and a central square respectively.

== Works ==
- Catholic Journey and Mission among the Mensâ, the Bogos and the Hababs, with a Geographical and Historical Mention of Abyssinia, Tip. of the Holy Congreg. of Propaganda Fide, 1857, original in the Public Library of Lyon (Bibliothèque Jésuite des Fontaines).
- Italy and the Suez Canal: Popular Operetta, Tip. Pellas, 1863, original at the University of Lausanne.
- Vulgar Arabic Grammar for Use in Technical Schools, Florence, 1866.
- "Assab and his Critics", Genoa, Pellas, 1879.
