= Tiyo =

Tio طع / طيعوا T'í'o
- Town
- Location in Eritrea
- Coordinates: 14°41′27″N 40°57′56″E
- Country: Eritrea
- Region: Southern Red Sea
- District: Are'eta
- Elevation: 0.91 m (3 ft)
- Climate: BWh

Tiyo (T'í'o, Arabic: طيعوا or طع) is a coastal town in east-central Eritrea, the capital of the Are'eta district in the Southern Red Sea region. Nearby towns and villages include Anrata (0.6 nm), Ad Gaban (6.3 nm), Sahli (8.0 nm), Babaiu (15.4 nm) and Faraon (17.9 nm).
