= Raffaele Rubattino =

Italian entrepreneur and shipowner (1810–1881)

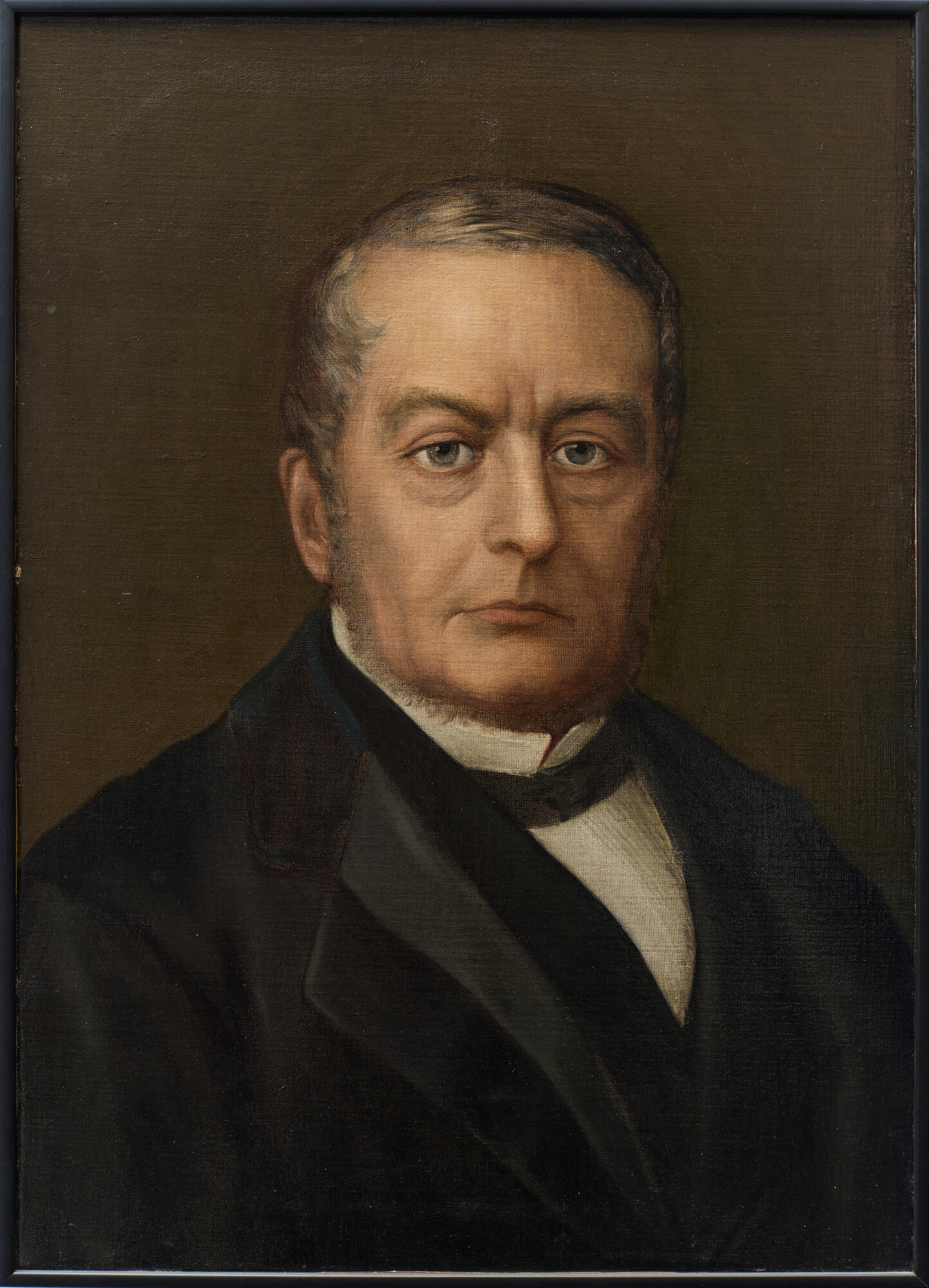
- Portrait c. 1870
- Born: October 10, 1810; Genoa, Italy
- Died: November 2, 1881 (aged 71); Albaro
- Occupations: Entrepreneur and colonialist
- Known for: Founder of merchant shipping company and founder of the Italian navy

Raffaele Rubattino (10 October 1810, Genoa – 2 November 1881) was an Italian entrepreneur and colonialist who started a shipping company that ran merchant ships on the routes to the Mediterranean and the Red Sea. He was also a founder of the Italian navy.

== Early life ==
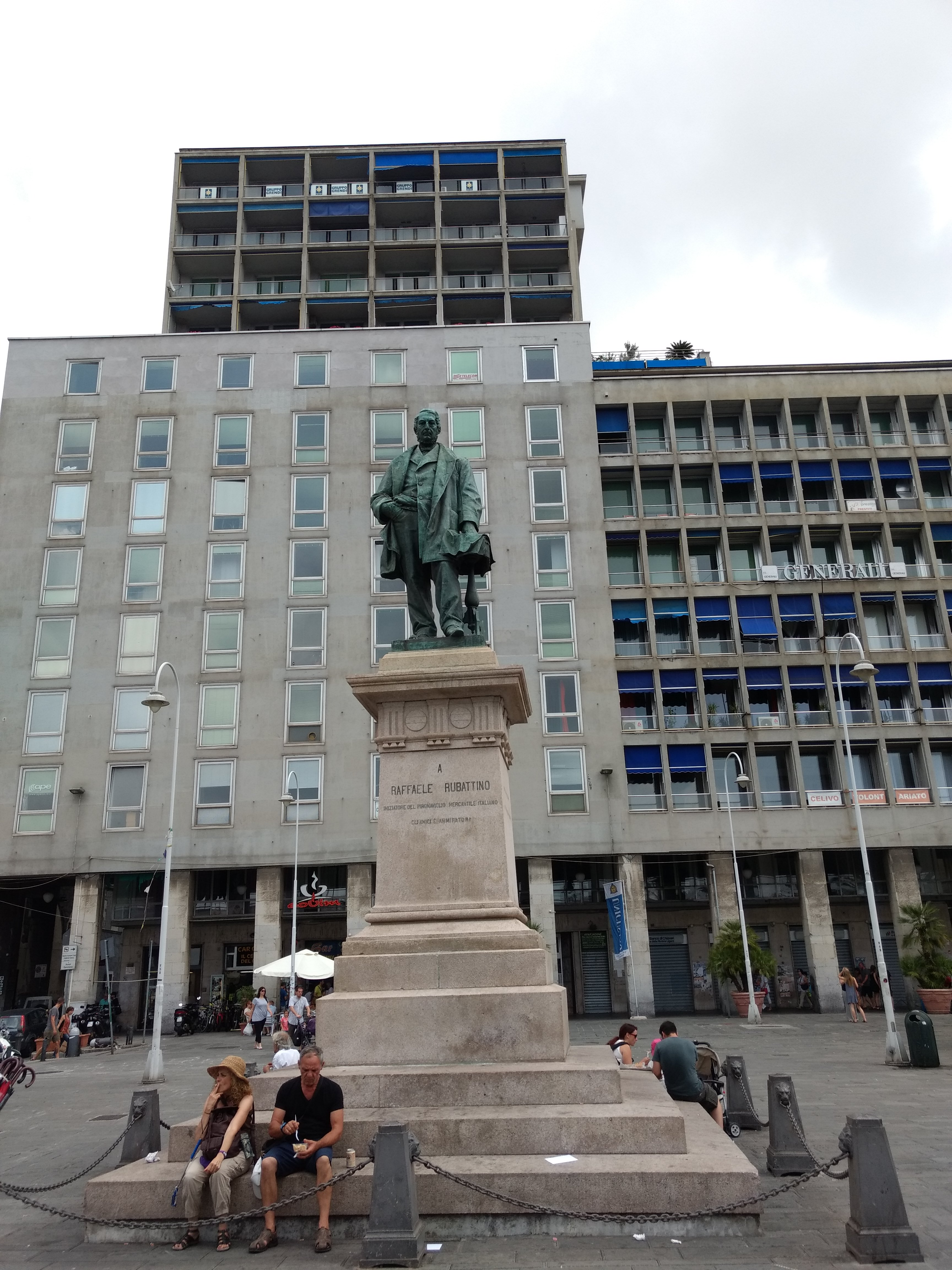
Statue in Genoa by Augusto Rivalta

Raffaele Rubattino was born in Genoa the business family of Pietro (1785-1829) and Giovanna Gavino (1785-1831). He attended the Royal College until and he lost his parents and sister Anna Amelia in his twenties. He was then assisted by his uncles Giovan Battista Gavino and Lazzaro Rebizzo. He moved to Doria palace where Rebizzo lived.

== Career ==
He worked for Lombard Insurance company for a while and started a transport business in 1833 between Genoa and Milan and merged it with the businesses of Gavino and Lazzaro Rebizzo. In 1840 it became De Luchi, Rubattino & Company. In 1841 their steamship the Polluce sank near Elba after colliding with the Mongebella. He started a courier business between Genoa and Milan in 1842 along with Gavino.

He also built larger ships: Cagliari, Piemonte, and Lombardo. The latter two carried Garibaldi and his men to Marsala in 1860. During the Great Depression, his company formed an agreement in 1881 with the Sicilian shipping company of Vincenzo Florio to form the Navigazione Generale Italiana.

== Politics ==
Rubattino was politically active and used his business to advance many causes. He was a patriot and supported Nino Bixio in the unification of Italy. In 1869, Rubattino saw the value of the Suez canal and bought the Bay of Assab from a local ruler through Giuseppe Sapeto. Initially only meant to be a coal depot, this aided Italian colonialism in Eritrea and the establishment of Italian Eritrea by the sale of the land to the Italian state in 1882.

== Death ==
On November 2, 1881, Rubattino died at his villa in Albaro from a malarial fever. He is buried at Staglieno and a statue by Augusto Rivalta stands at Piazza Caricamento in Genoa.
