= Berenice Epideires =

Ancient city in modern Djibouti

- Deirê
- Location within Djibouti
- 12°28′N 43°18′E
- Location: Djibouti
- Region: Obock Region

Berenice Epideires (Ancient Greek: Βερενίκη ἐπὶ Δειρῆς, Steph. B. s. v.; Strabo xvi. pp. 769, 773; Mela, iii. 8; Plin. vi. 34; Ptol. viii. 16. § 12), or "Berenice upon the Neck of Land", was a town on the western shore of the Red Sea. It was located near the Bab-el-Mandeb strait, in modern-day Djibouti a Somali region . The settlement's position on a sandy spit or promontory was the cause of its distinctive appellation. Some authorities, however, attribute the name to the neighborhood of a more considerable town named Deirê on the Ras Siyyan peninsula. Strabo mentions the mangroves that were found there on the coast. Ptolemy II Philadelphus favored the settlement thus naming after his sister Berenice. The inhabitants of the nation were known as the Ichthyophagi who inhabited the country and were recorded to have practiced male circumcision. It is said there is a pillar of Sesostris, on which is inscribed, in hieroglyphics, an account of his passage (across the Arabian Gulf). For he appears to have subdued first Ethiopia and Troglodytica, and afterwards to have passed over into Arabia.

The straits at Deirê are contracted to the width of 60 stadia; not indeed that these are now called the Straits, for ships proceed to a further distance, and find a passage of about 200 stadia between the two continents; six islands contiguous to one another leave a very narrow passage through them for vessels, by filling up the interval between the continents. Through these goods are transported from one continent to the other on rafts; it is this passage which is called the Straits. After these islands, the subsequent navigation is among bays along the Myrrh country, in the direction of south and east, as far as the Cinnamon country, a distance of about 5000 stadia; beyond this district no one to this time, it is said, has penetrated.

== Literature ==
- Lionel Casson: The Periplus Maris Erythraei: text, translation, and commentary. Princeton University Press, Princeton N.J. 1989, ISBN 0-691-04060-5.
- Getzel M. Cohen: The Hellenistic Settlements in Syria, the Red Sea Basin, and North Africa. University of California Press, Berkeley Calif. 2006, ISBN 0-520-24148-7.
- George Fadlo Hourani: Arab seafaring in the Indian Ocean. Princeton University Press, Princeton N.J. 1951.
- G. W. B. Huntingford (Hrsg.): The Periplus of the Erythraean Sea, by an unknown author: with some extracts from Agatharkhides ‘On the Erythraean Sea’ (= Works issued by the Hakluyt Society. 2nd series, Nr. 151). Hakluyt Society, London 1980.
- Katja Mueller: Settlements of the Ptolemies: City foundations and new settlement in the Hellenistic World (= Studia Hellenistica. Band 43). Peeters, Leuven 2006, ISBN 90-429-1709-1.
- D. Schlingloff: Indische Seefahrer in römischer Zeit. In: Hermann Müller-Karpe (Hrsg.) Zur geschichtlichen Bedeutung der frühen Seefahrt. Beck, München 1982, ISBN 3-406-09042-7, S. 51–82.
