= Bay of Anfile =

Bay in Eritrea

- Amphila Bay
- Location in Eritrea
- Coordinates: 14°46′N 40°47′E
- Ocean/sea sources: Red Sea
- Basin countries: Eritrea
- Max. length: 15 km (9.3 mi)
- Max. width: 20 km (12 mi)

Amphila Bay or Bay of Anfile is a bay on the Red Sea, on the coast of Eritrea.

The islands of Hando (Antu Ghebir or Hàmda) and Keda Hando are located facing the bay.
