= Multifocal fibrosclerosis =

- Other names: Idiopathic fibrosclerosis

Multifocal fibrosclerosis and idiopathic fibrosclerosis are disorders of unknown aetiology, characterised by fibrous lesions (co-)occurring at a variety of sites. Known manifestations include retroperitoneal fibrosis, mediastinal fibrosis and Riedel's thyroiditis.

They are now considered to be manifestations of IgG4-related disease.

== Signs and symptoms ==
The illness can present with a variety of symptoms, such as cholangitis, sclerosing pancreatitis, Riedel thyroiditis, and retroperitoneal fibrosis. Apart from the aforementioned characteristics, the syndrome has also been linked to pulmonary fibrosis, parotid gland fibrosis, lacrimal gland fibrosis, kidney fibrosclerosis, pancreatic fibrosis, and testicular fibrosis. Neurological manifestations such as pachymeningitis, cranial nerve palsies, hypopituitarism, and central diabetes insipidus have also been linked to neurological involvement.

== Causes ==
Multifocal fibrosclerosis's etiology is unknown, but one theory of the cause suggests that an autoimmune process is to blame. This is corroborated by the pathological features of cellular infiltration, which include plasma cells and lymphocytes, the commonly observed focal vasculitis on pathological examination, and the positive response of some multifocal fibrosclerosis patients to systemic corticosteroid treatment.

== Diagnosis ==
The diagnosis cannot be definitively confirmed by a test. However, common clinical findings include multiple areas of disseminated fibrosis, an elevated erythrocyte sedimentation rate (ESR), and an increased white cell count, particularly eosinophilia. High titers of autoantibodies are frequently observed, including rheumatoid factor, antinuclear antibody, and antithyroid antibodies. The fibrotic lesion's histology shows fibrosclerosis with noticeable hyalinizing collagen bundles and myofibroblast cell proliferation.

== Treatment ==
Numerous distinct treatment plans have been documented in the literature. There have been documented cases of treatment with radiotherapy, surgery, cyclophosphamide, and colchicine, frequently with only patchy results. Although the response to treatment varies, glucocorticoids are currently the preferred course of action.
