= Beilul =

Beilul بيلول
- Town
- Location in Eritrea
- Coordinates: 13°15′52″N 42°20′03″E
- Country: Eritrea
- Region: Southern Red Sea
- Elevation: 664 m (2,178 ft)
- Climate: BWh

Beilul (Ge'ez: በይሉል, romanized: Bäylul, Arabic: بيلول, alternatively, Beylul) formerly known as Baylour is a small cape town in the Southern Red Sea Region of Eritrea.

Beilul was the historical main port ruled by the Kingdom of Dankali and as a point of communication to the outside world. It was also a place of minimal trade between Mokha.

Jerónimo Lobo passed Beilul in 1625 and wrote that it was a small port with no more than 50 inhabitants. The route inland led through virtually waterless land and was dangerous because of hostile tribes.

When Massawa was occupied by the Ottoman Empire, the Ethiopian Emperor Fasilides tried to develop a new trade route via Baylul. His choice fell on Baylul, because this port was beyond the Ottoman sphere of control and directly opposite the harbor of Mokha in Yemen. In 1642 he sent a message to the Imam of Yemen al-Mu'ayyad Mohammed to gain his support for this project. Since al-Mu'ayyad Mohammed and his son al-Mutawakkil Isma'il assumed that Fasilides was interested in a conversion to Islam, a Yemeni embassy was sent to Gondar in 1646. However, when the Yemenites understood Fasilides' actual motives, their enthusiasm sank and the project was abandoned.
