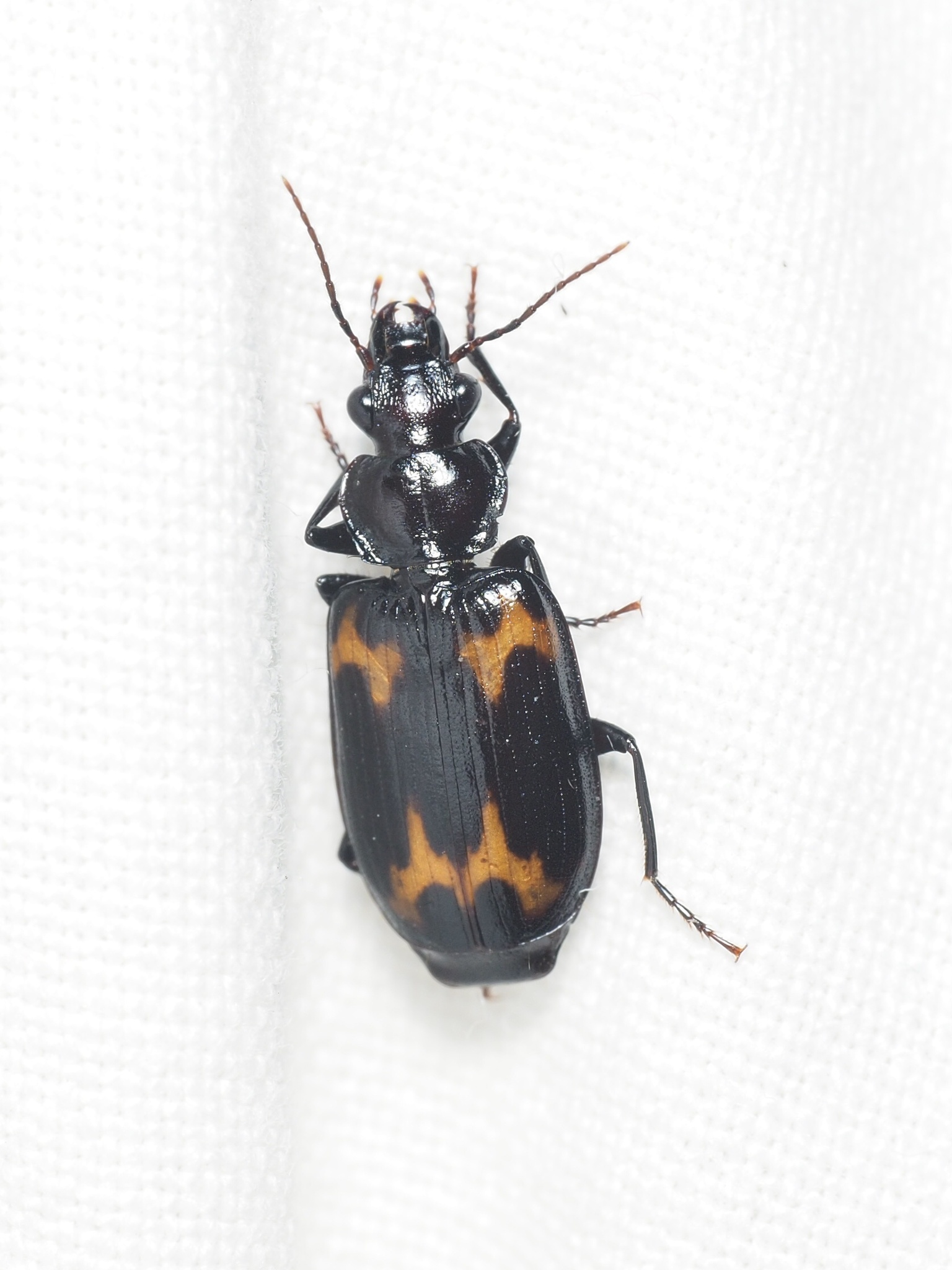
- Arsinoe fraterna, Zimbabwe

Scientific classification
- Domain: Eukaryota
- Kingdom: Animalia
- Phylum: Arthropoda
- Class: Insecta
- Order: Coleoptera
- Suborder: Adephaga
- Family: Carabidae
- Subfamily: Lebiinae
- Tribe: Lebiini
- Subtribe: Pericalina
- Genus: Arsinoe; Laporte, 1834

Synonyms
- Axinopsophus Chaudoir, 1837; Axinosophus Boheman, 1848; Nycteomorpha Fairmaire, 1901

= Arsinoe (beetle) =

Genus of beetles

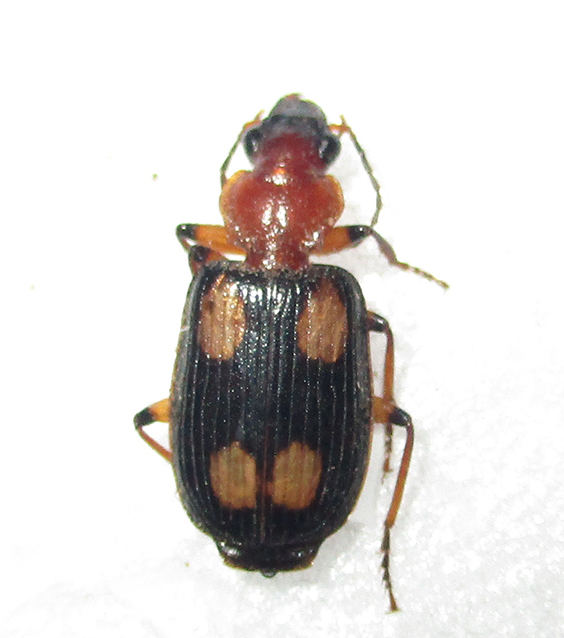
Arsinoe quadriguttata, Botswana

Arsinoe is a genus of carabids in the beetle family Carabidae. There are more than 20 described species in Arsinoe, found in Africa.

== Species ==
These 27 species belong to the genus Arsinoe:

- Arsinoe alluaudi Burgeon, 1937 (DR Congo, Malawi)
- Arsinoe becvari Facchini, 2011 (Zimbabwe)
- Arsinoe biguttata Chaudoir, 1877 (Gabon, DR Congo, Kenya)
- Arsinoe caffra Péringuey, 1896 (Mozambique, Zimbabwe, South Africa)
- Arsinoe camerunica Basilewsky, 1970 (Cameroon, Zambia)
- Arsinoe distinguenda Péringuey, 1896 (South Africa)
- Arsinoe elisabethana Burgeon, 1937 (DR Congo)
- Arsinoe flavosignata (Gory, 1833) (Senegal/Gambia, Sierra Leone, Ivory Coast)
- Arsinoe fraterna Péringuey, 1896 (DR Congo, Mozambique, Zimbabwe, Namibia, South Africa)
- Arsinoe fulvipes (Fairmaire, 1869) (Madagascar)
- Arsinoe grandis Péringuey, 1898 (DR Congo, Zimbabwe, South Africa)
- Arsinoe kenyensis Facchini, 2011 (Kenya)
- Arsinoe laevigata Basilewsky, 1970 (Ivory Coast, Central African Republic, DR Congo)
- Arsinoe lyrata Burgeon, 1937 (DR Congo)
- Arsinoe miranda Burgeon, 1937 (DR Congo, Uganda)
- Arsinoe mirei Basilewsky, 1970 (Cameroon)
- Arsinoe nigra Facchini, 2011 (Kenya)
- Arsinoe nigripes Basilewsky, 1970 (Cameroon, DR Congo)
- Arsinoe notabilis Péringuey, 1896 (DR Congo, Tanzania, Zambia, Zimbabwe, South Africa)
- Arsinoe oneili Barker, 1919 (DR Congo, Zambia, Zimbabwe)
- Arsinoe orientalis Facchini, 2017 (Kenya)
- Arsinoe plausibilis Péringuey, 1896 (South Africa)
- Arsinoe quadriguttata Laporte, 1835 (Zimbabwe, South Africa)
- Arsinoe rugiceps Facchini, 2017 (Cameroon)
- Arsinoe salvadorensis Kolbe, 1889 (Guinea, DR Congo)
- Arsinoe triguttata Facchini, 2011 (Senegal/Gambia, Burkina Faso, Benin, Central African Republic)
- Arsinoe zambiensis Facchini, 2011 (Zambia)
