= Are'eta subregion =

Are'eta
- Subregion
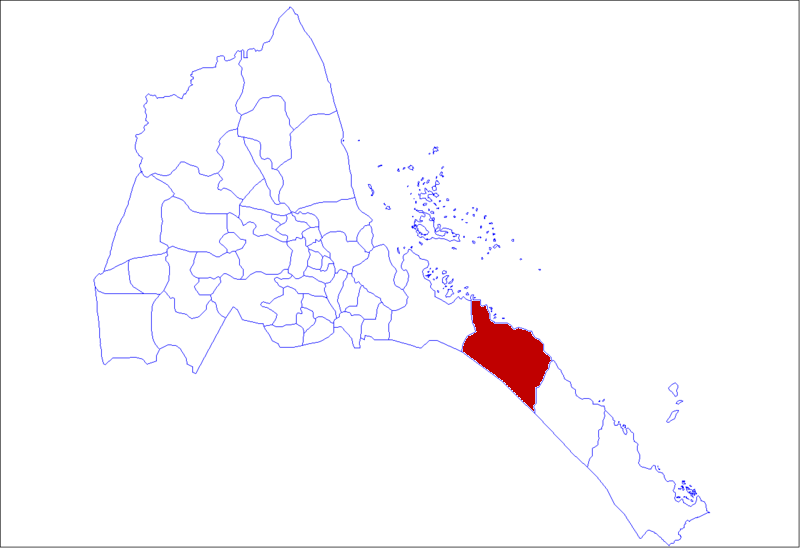
- Location in Eritrea
- Country: Eritrea
- Region: Southern Red Sea
- Capital: Tiyo
- Time zone: UTC+3 (GMT +3)

Are'eta subregion is a subregion in the Southern Red Sea region (Zoba Debubawi Keyih Bahri) of Eritrea. With its capital at Tiyo, the administrative district's coastline includes the Bay of Anfilla.
