= Southern Denkalya subregion =

Coordinates: 13°01′N 42°44′E

Southern Denkalya
- Subregion
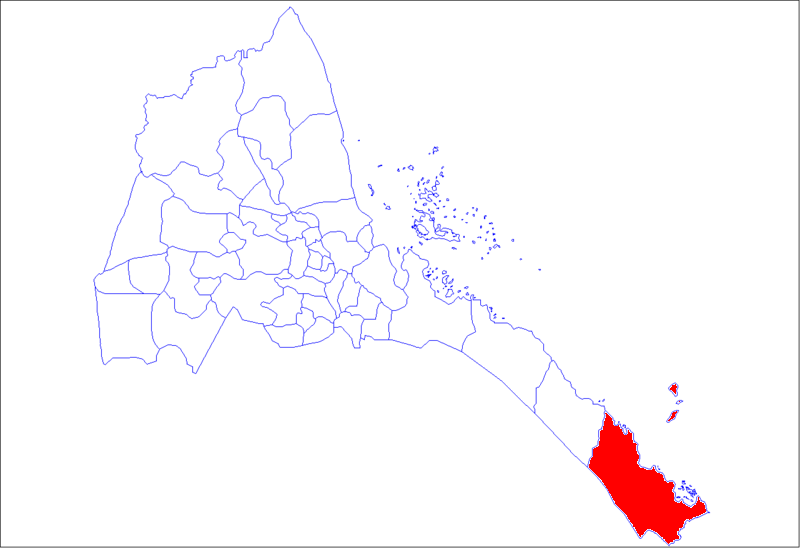
- Southern Denkalya subregion
- Interactive map of Southern Denkalya
- Country: Eritrea
- Region: Southern Red Sea
- Time zone: UTC+3 (GMT +3)

Southern Denkalya is a subregion in the Southern Red Sea region (Zoba Debubawi Keyih Bahri) of Eritrea.
