= Southern Red Sea region =

Administrative region in southern Eritrea

Coordinates: 13°45′N 41°30′E

Southern Red Sea zone ዞባ ደቡባዊ ቀይሕ ባሕሪ (Tigrinya) إقليم جنوب البحر الأحمر (Arabic)
- Region
- Southern Red Sea Region in Eritrea
- Country: Eritrea
- Capital: Assab

Government
  - Administrator: Tsegereda Woldegergish

Area
  - Total: 27,600 km^{2} (10,700 sq mi)

Population
  - Total: 398,073
  - Density: 14.4/km^{2} (37.4/sq mi)
- ISO 3166 code: ER-DK
- HDI (2022): 0.493 low · 2nd

The Southern Red Sea region (Tigrinya: ዞባ ደቡባዊ ቀይሕ ባሕሪ, romanized: Zoba Däbubawi Käyh Bahri, Arabic: إقليم جنوب البحر الأحمر) is an administrative region of Eritrea. It lies along the southern half of the Red Sea, and contains the coastal city of Assab. It borders the Northern Red Sea Region, Djibouti and Ethiopia, and has an area of around 27,600 km^{2} (10,700 sq mi).

As of 2005, the region had a population of 83,500 compared to a population of 73,700 in 2001. The net growth rate was 11.74%. The total area of the province was 27 600 km^{2} and the density was 3.03 persons per km^{2}.

== Geography ==
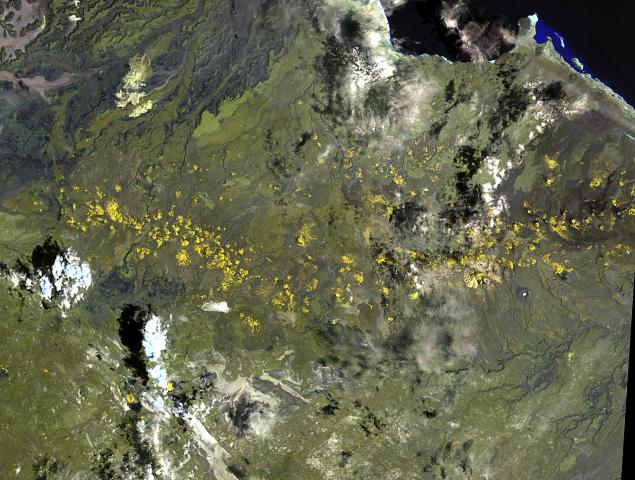
A volcanic field

The Southern Red Sea Region extends over 500 km (310 mi) along Red Sea coast but is only around 50 km (31 mi) wide. Forming the major part of the Danakil Desert, its major towns include Asseb, Beilul, Rahaita and T'i'o. The highest point in this region is Mount Ramlu (2,248 metres (7,375 ft)). It is generally considered one of the hottest, driest, and most inhospitable regions in the country. The topography of the region has coastal plains, which are hotter than the regions around the highland plateau. There are two rainy seasons, the heavier one during summer and the lighter one during spring. The climate and geography of the region along with other regions of Eritrea are similar to the one of Ethiopia. The hottest month is May recording temperatures up to 30 °C (86 °F), while the coldest month is December to February when it reaches freezing temperature. The region received around 200 mm (7.9 in) of rainfall and the soil is salty and not conducive for agriculture.

Wildlife such as hamadryas baboons, Soemmerring's gazelle, dorcas gazelle, warthog, black-backed jackal, Ruppells sandfox, dikdik, African golden wolf, hyena, Abyssinian hare, wild ass and ostriches are found in this region. African wild dog was also found in this region, but their present condition is unknown. There have been reports of cheetah occurring in this region, but there has been no evidence of their presence. It is extremely likely that both cheetah and wild dog are extinct in Eritrea.

== Demographics ==
As of 2005, the region had a population of 83,500 compared to a population of 73,700 in 2001. The net growth rate was 11.74%. The total area of the province is about 27,600 km^{2} and the density was 3.03 persons per km^{2}. As of 2002, the Total Fertility Rate (TFR), defined as the children per woman was 3.9. The General Fertility Rate (GFR), defined as the births per 1,000 women between the ages of 15 and 45 remained at 135.0. The Crude Birth Rate (CBR), the number of births per 1,000 population, was 34.0. The percentage of women pregnant as of 2002 out of the total population was 8.9%. The mean number of children ever born stood at 5.1. The Infant Mortality Rate (IMR), defined as the number of deaths of children for every 1,000 born was 122.0 while the Child Mortality Rate (CMR), defined as the number of child deaths for every 1,000 children 5 years of age was 74.0. The under-5 mortality rate stood at 187.0. The number of children with the prevalence of Acute Respiratory Infection (ARI) was 174, fever was 174, and Diarrhea was 174. The number of women with the knowledge of AIDS was 324 and the number of people with no knowledge of the disease or its prevention was 0.2%.

== Education and economy ==
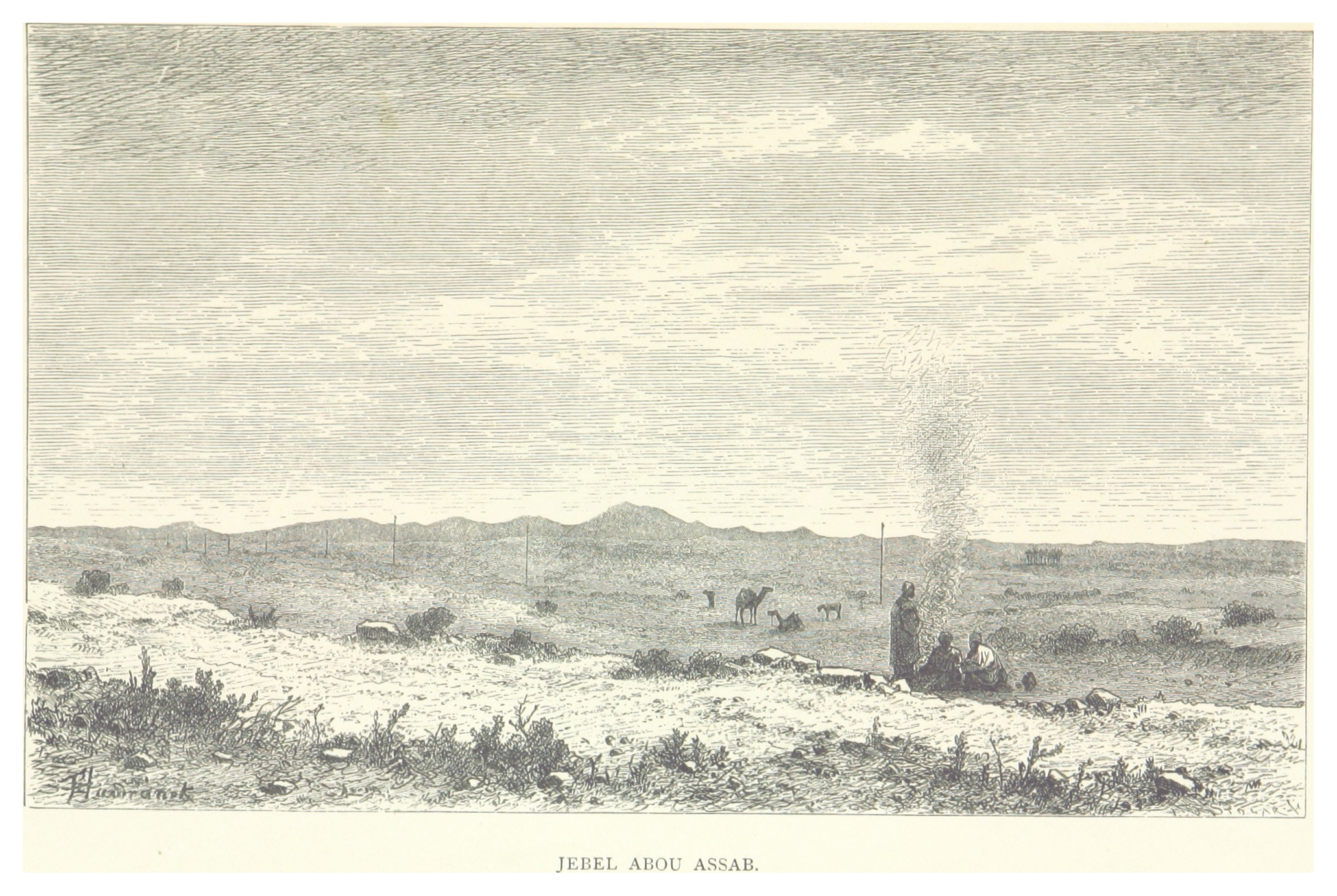
Desert in the region

As of 2002, the number of males completing or attending the highest level of schooling in the region was 410 while it was 567 females. The percentage of literate males was 60.00 and the percentage of literate females was 41.60. A fraction of 37.60 males had no education, while the corresponding number for females was 54.80. The fraction of males completing secondary school stood at 8.40 and the fraction of males completing more than secondary was 003. The corresponding numbers for females were 4.10 and 000 respectively.

As of 2002, the number of people engaged in Professional/technical/managerial activities was 3.30%, Clerical was 9.30%, Sales and services was 21.10%, Skilled Manual was 4.50%, Unskilled Manual was 0.50%, Domestic Service was 25.00% and Agriculture was 34.60%. The total number of employed men was 345 and the total number of employed women was 409. The number of men who were paid their total earnings in cash was 77.70%, in-kind was 0.10, and in both was 0.20. The number of women who were paid their total earnings in cash was 58.80%, in-kind was 0.60%, and in both was 0.30%.

== Administration ==
The region also includes the following districts: Are'eta District, Central Denkalya District and Southern Denkalya District. Eritrea has a one party national Assembly governed by People’s Front for Democracy and Justice (PFDJ) (originally Eritrean Liberation Front), an authoritarian government. From the time of independence since 30 May 1991, the country has been continuing with a transitional government elected during the elections in April 1993. The scheduled elections in 2001 has been postponed indefinitely. The regional and local elections are conducted on a periodic basis on a restricted framework. All men and women of any ethnic or religious background are eligible to vote. No parties or groups other than PFDJ are allowed to contest and the elections are presided by representatives from PDFJ. Policy decisions should be centered around the party mandate and opposition and dissenters have been imprisoned.
