= Museum for the Macedonian Struggle =

Museum for the Macedonian Struggle may refer to:

== Greece ==
- Museum for the Macedonian Struggle (Thessaloniki)
- Museum of the Macedonian Struggle (Chromio)
- Museum of the Macedonian Struggle (Kastoria)

== North Macedonia ==
- Museum of the Macedonian Struggle (Skopje)

== See also ==
- Macedonian Struggle
- Macedonia (region)
- World War II in Yugoslav Macedonia
