= Museum of the Macedonian Struggle (Chromio) =

History museum in Chromio, Greece

Coordinates: 40.1686°N 21.7125°E

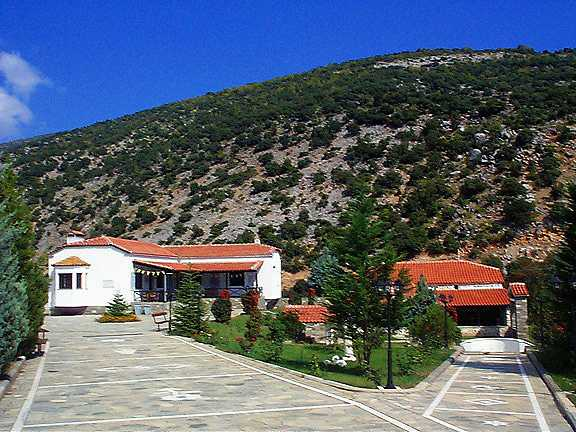
General view of the museum

The Museum of the Macedonian Struggle near Chromio, Kozani, Greece is an open-air museum created and landscaped over an area of 7 hectares presenting the struggles of the Greeks in Macedonia.

The museum was founded in 1989 by the Letters and Arts Association of Kozani in commemoration of the February 1878 uprising, which took place in the region aiming to abrogate the Treaty of San Stefano. The ultimate objective of the uprising was to prevent Macedonia from becoming part of Bulgaria, to throw off the Ottoman domination, and to be part of the Hellenic state. On Mt Bourinos, the “Provisional Government of the province of Elimeia in Macedonia” was formed, headed by Ioannis Goventaros from Kozani; its secretary was the teacher Anastasios Picheon from Ohrid, founding member of the “Educational Association of Kastoria”.

Objects belonging to or associated with fighters are displayed in the interior exhibition area. Busts of 21 fighters, a monument to fallen heroes, as well as busts of Philip II, king of Macedonia, Alexander the Great and others are likewise on display in the open-air exhibition area.

Within the museum's boundaries there is also the restored church of Agios Nikolaos with splendid wall paintings and marble inscriptions around it, with maxims and epigrams from Greek history. Of historical significance is the fact that in this church in 1878 the guns of the revolt were blessed.

== Image Gallery ==
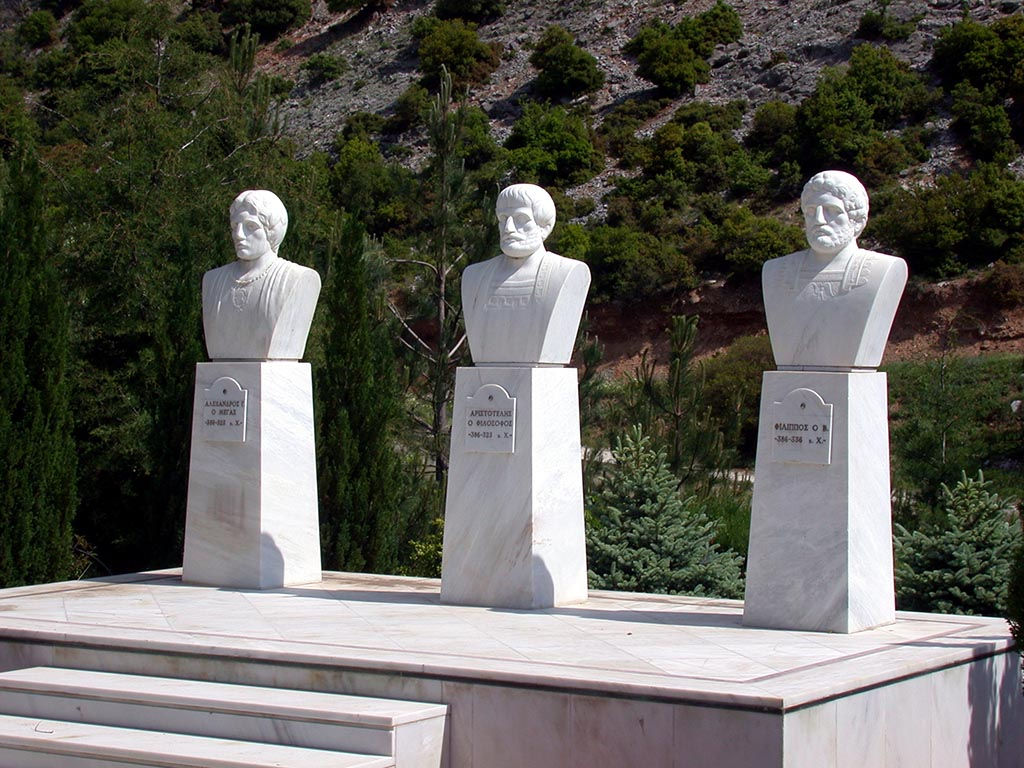
Busts of Alexander the Great, Aristotle and Phillip II of Macedonia

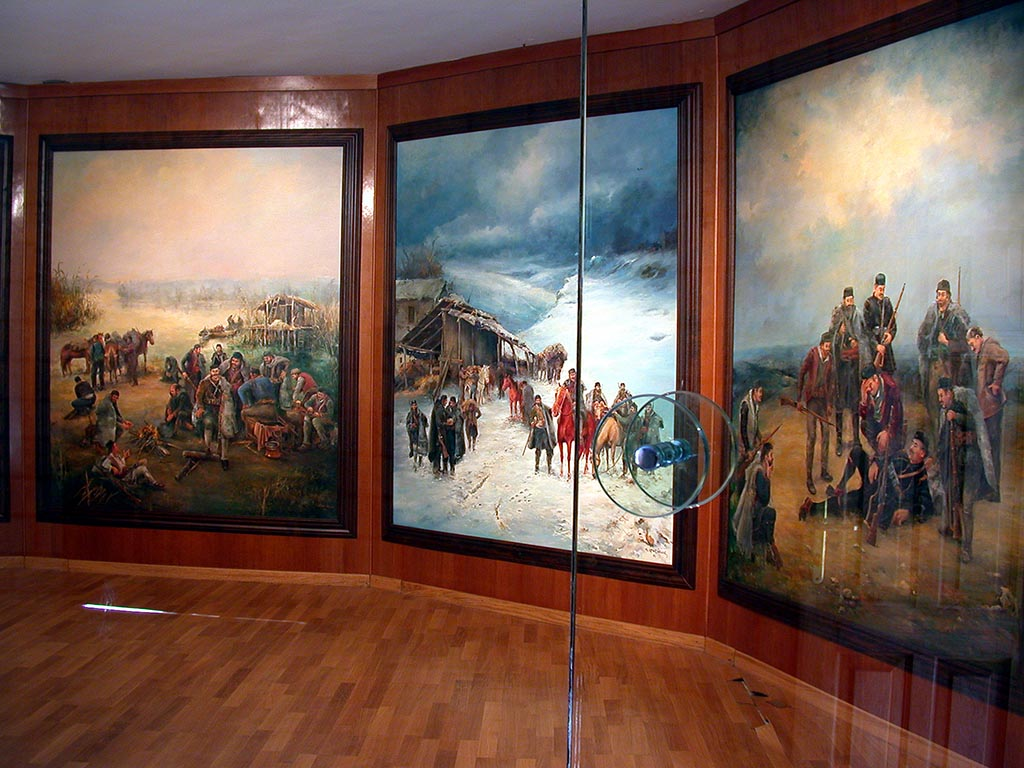
Internal view of museum
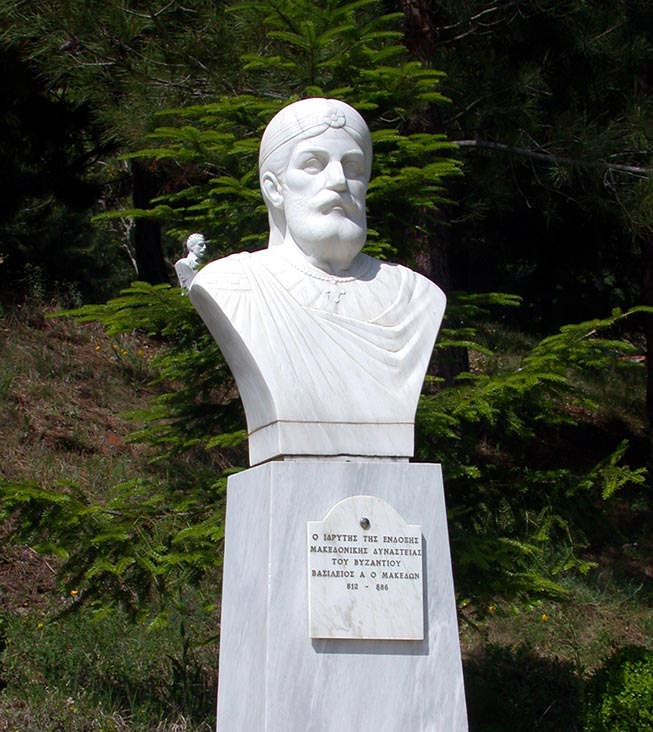
Basil I, founder of the Byzantine Macedonian dynasty
