= Great Eastern Crisis =

Series of uprisings against Ottoman rule in Southeastern Europe in the 1870s

Great Eastern Crisis (1875–1878)
- Part of the rise of nationalism in the Ottoman Empire and of the Great Game
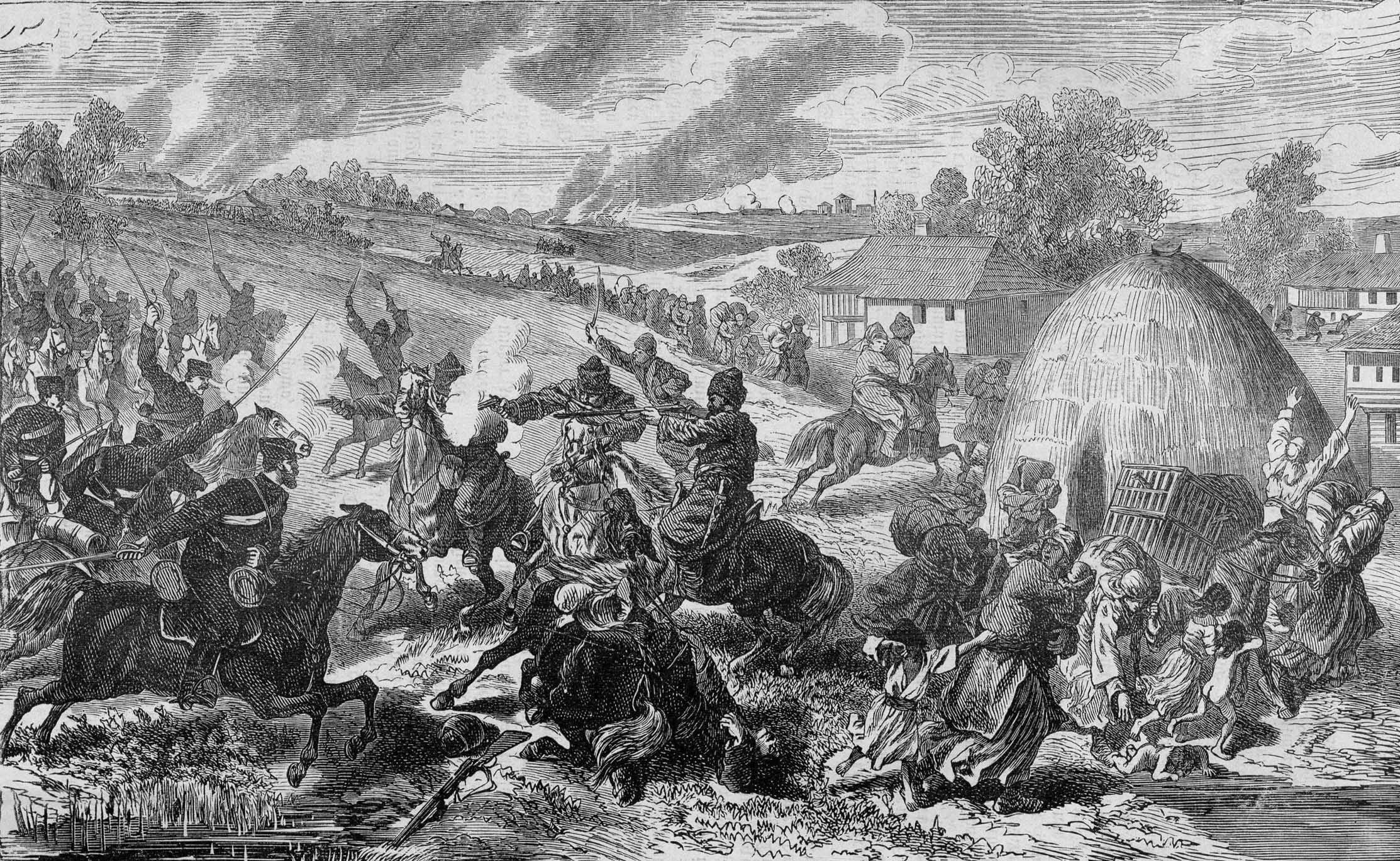
- Serbian soldiers attacking the Ottoman army at Mramor, 1877
Date	19 June 1875 – 13 July 1878 (3 years, 3 weeks and 3 days)
Location	Balkan Peninsula, the Caucasus, Southeastern Europe, and East Anatolia
Result	Ottoman defeat: Treaty of Berlin; Austrian and Russian intervention
Territorial changes	Reestablishment of the Bulgarian state; De jure independence of Romania, Serbia, and Montenegro from the Ottoman Empire; Kars and Batum annexed by the Russian Empire as Oblasts.

Belligerents
Russia; Grand Duchy of Finland; Romania; Bulgaria; Montenegro; Serbia; Austria-Hungary; Greek rebels; Supported by: France	Ottoman Empire; Egypt; Bosnia Vilayet; Albanian volunteers; Circassian volunteers; Polish Legion; Imamate rebels Abkhazian rebels Supported by: United Kingdom

Commanders and leaders
(Russian Empire) Alexander II; (Russian Empire) Grand Duke Nicholas Nikolaevich; (Russian Empire) Grand Duke Michael Nikolaevich; (Russian Empire) Mikhail Loris-Melikov; (Russian Empire) Mikhail Skobelev; (Russian Empire) Iosif Gurko; (Russian Empire) Ivan Lazarev; Carol I of Romania; (Principality of Bulgaria) Alexander of Battenberg; (Principality of Montenegro) Prince Nikola; Kosta Protić; Stjepan Jovanović; Kosmas Doumpiotis	(Ottoman Empire) Abdul Aziz; (Ottoman Empire) Murad V; (Ottoman Empire) Abdul Hamid II; (Ottoman Empire) Ahmed Pasha; (Ottoman Empire) Osman Pasha; (Ottoman Empire) Suleiman Pasha; (Ottoman Empire) Mehmed Pasha; (Ottoman Empire) Abdülkerim Nadir Pasha; (Ottoman Empire) Ahmed Eyüb Pasha; (Ottoman Empire) Mehmed Riza Pasha

Strength
(Russian Empire) 185,000 in the Army of the Danube, 75,000 in the Caucasian Army; Finland: 1,000; (Romania) 66,000; (Principality of Bulgaria) 12,000, 190 cannons; (Principality of Serbia) 81,500; (Principality of Montenegro) 45,000; 15,000	(Ottoman Empire) 281,000

Casualties and losses
(Russian Empire) 15,567 killed, 56,652 wounded, 6,824 died from wounds; (Romania) 4,302 killed and missing, 3,316 wounded, 19,904 sick; (Tsardom of Bulgaria (1908–1946)) 2,456 dead and wounded; (Principality of Serbia) (Principality of Montenegro) 2,400 dead and wounded	(Ottoman Empire) 30,000 killed, 90,000 died from wounds and diseases

The Great Eastern Crisis of 1875–1878 began in the Ottoman Empire's administrative territories in the Balkan Peninsula in 1875, with the outbreak of several uprisings and wars that resulted in the intervention of international powers, and was ended with the Treaty of Berlin in July 1878.

The war is referred to differently in various languages of the peoples involved in it due to differing sociocultural backgrounds. In Serbo-Croatian and Turkish, the war is likewise referred to as Velika istočna kriza ("Great Eastern Crisis") and Şark Buhranı ("Eastern Crisis") respectively. However, the occasionally used Turkish name Ramazan Kararnamesi ("Decree of Ramadan") refers specifically to the sovereign default declared on 30 October 1875 in historiography while 93 Harbi ("War of 93") refers to the Russo-Turkish War (the year 1293 of the Islamic Rumi calendar corresponding to the year 1877 on the Gregorian calendar).

== Background ==
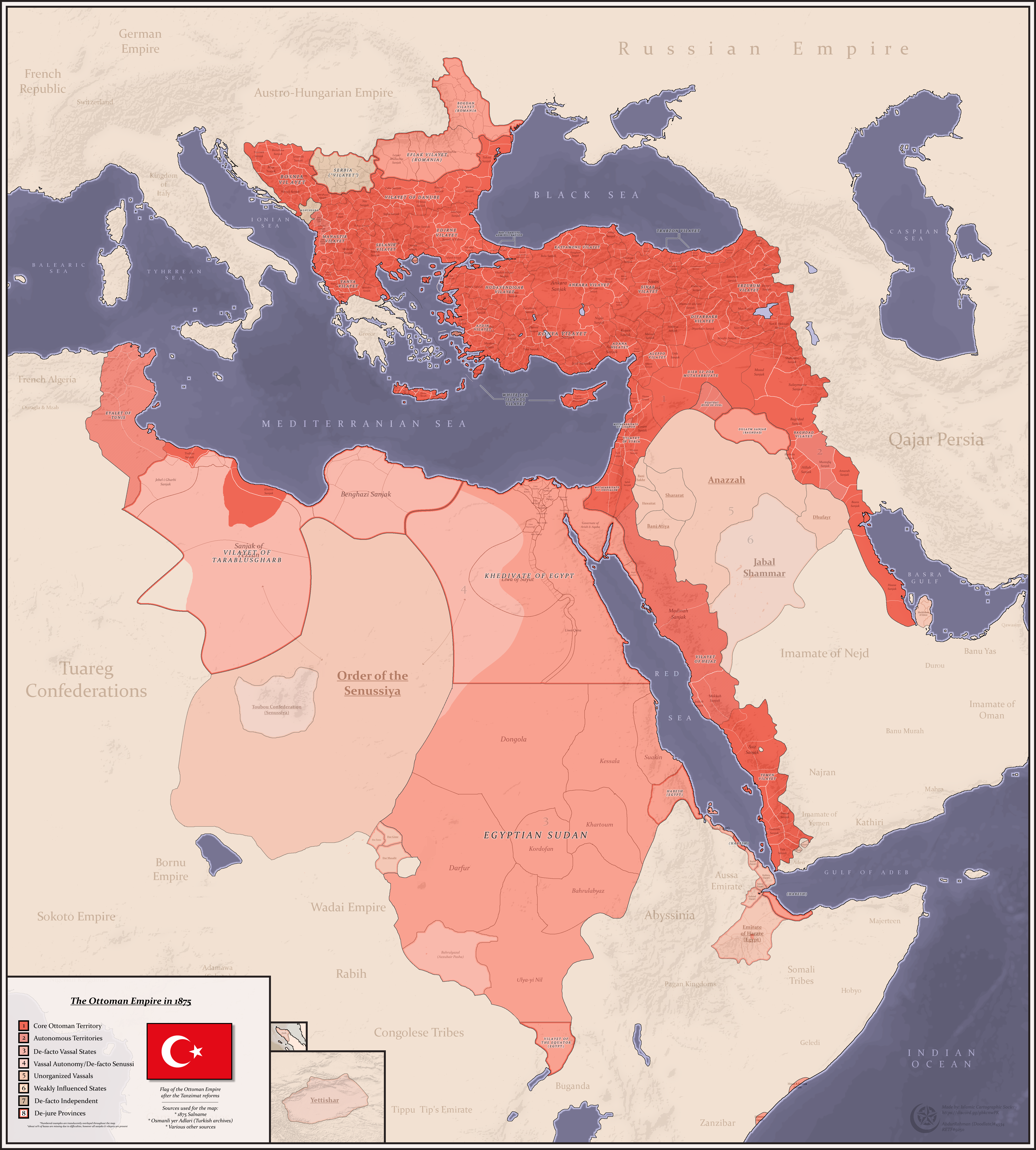
Territorial extent of the Ottoman Empire in 1875, right before the Great Eastern Crisis

The state of Ottoman administration in the Balkans continued to deteriorate throughout the 19th century, with the Sublime Porte occasionally losing control over whole provinces. Reforms imposed by the European Great Powers did little to improve the conditions of the Christian population, while at the same time managing to dissatisfy a sizable portion of the Muslim population. The Ottoman province of Bosnia suffered at least two waves of rebellion by the local Muslim population, the most recent in 1850. The Austro-Hungarian Empire consolidated after the turmoil of the first half of the century and sought to reinvigorate its longstanding policy of expansion at the expense of the Ottoman Empire. Meanwhile, the nominally autonomous, de facto independent principalities of Serbia and Montenegro also sought to expand into regions inhabited by their compatriots. Nationalist and irredentist sentiments were strong and were encouraged by Russia and its agents.

=== Ottoman economic crisis and default ===
On 24 August 1854, during the Crimean War, the Ottoman Empire took its first foreign loans. The empire entered into subsequent loans, partly to finance the construction of railways and telegraph lines, and partly to finance deficits between revenues and the lavish expenditures of the imperial court, such as the construction of new palaces on the Bosphorus strait in Constantinople. Some financial commentators have noted that the terms of these loans were exceptionally favourable to the British and French banks (owned by the Rothschild family) which facilitated them, whereas others have noted that the terms reflected the imperial administration's willingness to constantly refinance its debts. A large amount of money was also spent for building new ships for the Ottoman Navy during the reign of Sultan Abdülaziz (r. 1861–1876). In 1875, the Ottoman Navy had 21 battleships and 173 warships of other types, which formed the third largest naval fleet in the world after those of the British and French navies. All of these expenditures, however, put a huge strain on the Ottoman treasury. In the meantime, a severe drought in Anatolia in 1873 and flooding in 1874 caused famine and widespread discontent in the heart of the empire. The agricultural shortages interfered with the collection of taxes, leading to the Ottoman government declaring a sovereign default on its foreign loan repayments on 30 October 1875 and increase taxes in all of its provinces, including the Balkans.

=== Uprisings and wars in the Balkans ===
The decision to increase taxes for paying the Ottoman Empire's debts to foreign creditors resulted in outrage in the Balkan provinces, which culminated in the Great Eastern Crisis and ultimately the Russo-Turkish War (1877–78) that provided independence or autonomy for the Christian nations in the empire's Balkan territories, with the subsequent Treaty of Berlin in 1878. The war, however, was disastrous for the already struggling Ottoman economy and the Ottoman Public Debt Administration was established in 1881, which gave the control of the Ottoman state revenues to foreign creditors. This made the European creditors bondholders, and assigned special rights to the OPDA for collecting various types of tax and customs revenues.

== Aftermath ==
After the Treaty of Berlin in 1878, Austria-Hungary stationed military garrisons in the Ottoman Vilayet of Bosnia and Ottoman Sanjak of Novi Pazar, which formally (de jure) continued to be Ottoman territories. Taking advantage of the chaos that occurred during the Young Turk Revolution in 1908, Bulgaria declared its formal independence on 5 October 1908. The following day, Austria-Hungary unilaterally annexed Bosnia on 6 October 1908, but pulled its military forces out of Novi Pazar in order to reach a compromise with the Ottoman government and avoid a war (the Ottoman Empire lost the Sanjak of Novi Pazar with the Balkan Wars of 1912–1913.)

In 1881, France occupied the Ottoman Beylik of Tunisia, with the excuse that Tunisian troops had crossed the border into their colony of Algeria, which also formerly belonged to the Ottoman Empire until 1830. A year later, in 1882, the British Empire occupied the Ottoman Khedivate of Egypt, with the pretext of giving military assistance to the Ottomans for putting down the Urabi Revolt (Britain later declared Egypt a British protectorate on 5 November 1914, in response to the Ottoman government's decision to join World War I on the side of the Central Powers.) It is worth noting that the Ottoman government had frequently declared the tax revenues from Egypt as a surety for borrowing loans from British and French banks. The Ottoman government had earlier leased Cyprus to Britain in 1878, in exchange for British support at the Congress of Berlin in the same year (Cyprus was later annexed by Britain on 5 November 1914, for the same aforementioned reason regarding the Ottoman participation in World War I.) By obtaining Cyprus and Egypt, Britain gained an important foothold in the East Mediterranean and control over the Suez Canal; while France increased its lands in the West Mediterranean coast of North Africa by adding Tunisia to its empire as a French protectorate.

Historian Maroš Melichárek writes that the Great Eastern Crisis could not have been fully resolved without Serbia.

== Chronology of the Great Eastern Crisis and its aftermath ==
=== Precursors ===
- Franco-Prussian War (1870–1871)
- Anatolian famine (1873–1875)
- Panic of 1873 (1873–1877/1879)

=== Crisis ===
- Herzegovina uprising (1875–1877)
- Stara Zagora Uprising (1875)
- Ottoman Reform Edict of 1875
- Andrássy Note (1875)
- April Uprising (1876)
- Salonika Incident (1876)
- Razlovci uprising (1876)
- 1876 Ottoman coup d'état
- Çerkez Hasan incident
- Serbian–Ottoman Wars (1876–1878)
- Montenegrin–Ottoman War (1876–1878)
- Constantinople Conference (1876–1877)
- First Constitutional Era (1876–1878)
- Russo-Turkish War (1877–1878)
  - Romanian War of Independence
  - Provisional Russian Administration in Bulgaria
  - Treaty of San Stefano (1878)
  - Expulsion of the Albanians (1877–1878)
- Çırağan incident 1878
- Congress of Berlin (1878)
- Kumanovo uprising (1878)
- 1878 Greek Macedonian rebellion
- Epirus Revolt of 1878
- Cretan revolt (1878)
- Austro-Hungarian campaign in Bosnia and Herzegovina in 1878
- Kresna–Razlog uprising (1878)

=== Treaties ===
- Reichstadt Agreement (1876)
- Budapest Convention of 1877
- Treaty of San Stefano (1878)
- Cyprus Convention (1878)
- Treaty of Berlin (1878)

=== Aftermath ===
- Armenian question
- League of Prizren (1878–1881)
  - Battles for Plav and Gusinje (1879–1880)
- Uprising of Sheikh Ubeydullah (1879–1880)
- Pact of Halepa (1878)
- Dual Alliance (1879)
- Urabi revolt (1879–1882)
- 1879–1881 Anatolian famine
- Brsjak revolt (1880–1881)
- French conquest of Tunisia (1881)
- Austro-Serbian Alliance of 1881
- Convention of Constantinople (1881)
- Ottoman Public Debt Administration (1881–1944)
- Yildiz Trials (1881)
- Herzegovina Uprising (1882)
- British Conquest of Egypt (1882)
- Austro-Hungarian–German–Romanian alliance (1883)
- Timok Rebellion (1883)
- Bulgarian Crisis (1885–1888)

== Gallery ==
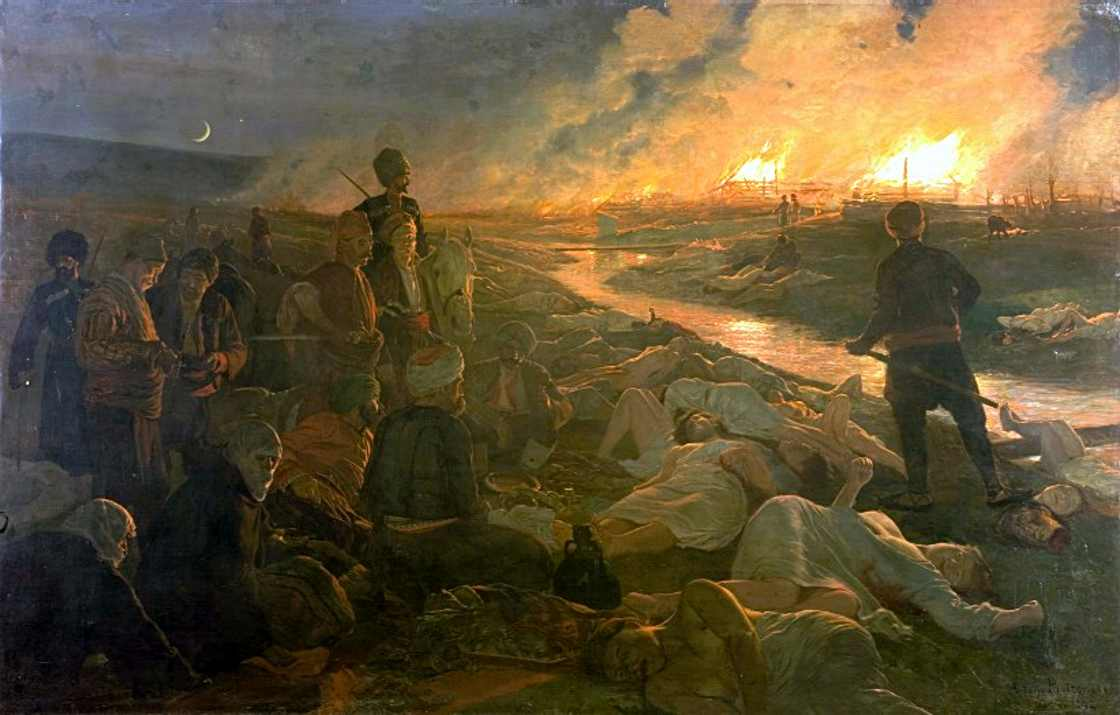
The Batak massacre carried out by Ottoman irregular troops in Bulgaria (1876)

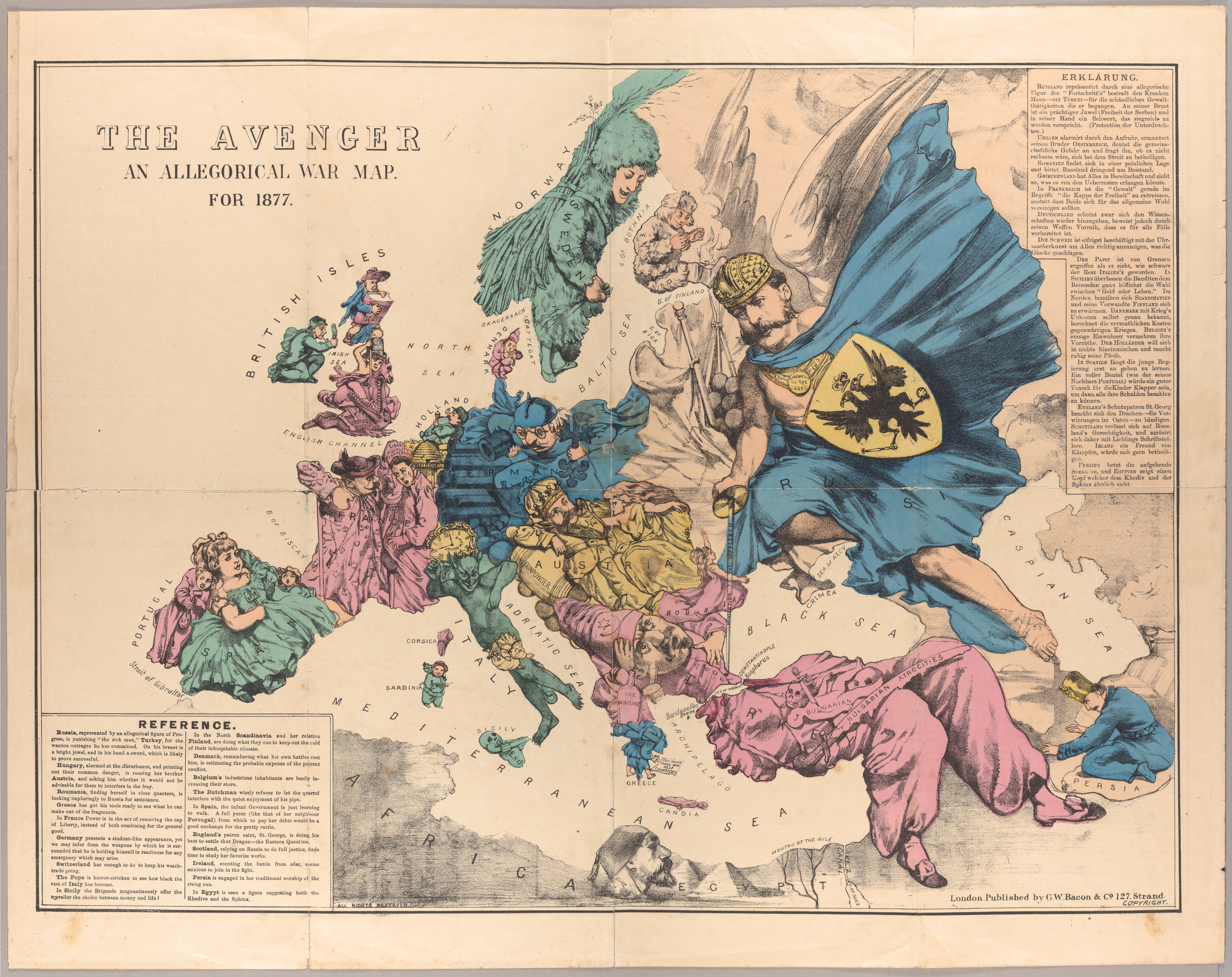
The Avenger: An Allegorical War Map for 1877 by Fred. W. Rose, 1872: This map reflects the Great Eastern Crisis and the subsequent Russo-Turkish War (1877–1878).
