= Argyrios Vouzas =

Greek Revolutionary

- Native name: Αργύριος Βούζας
- Born: c. 1857; Kastoria, Monastir Vilayet, Ottoman Empire (now Greece)
- Allegiance: Kingdom of Greece; Aut. Rep. Northern Epirus
- Branch: HMC; Hellenic Army
- Conflicts: Macedonian Struggle; Balkan Wars: First Balkan War; Second Balkan War; North Epirote Struggle
- Education: University of Athens
- Other work: Doctor member of the New Filiki Etaireia

Argyrios Vouzas (Greek: Αργύριος Βούζας) was a Greek revolutionary and doctor of the 19th and 20th centuries.

== Biography ==
Vouzas was born in about 1857 in Kastoria, then Ottoman Empire (now Greece). He studied at a Greek school of Kastoria, at a Monastir high school and later graduated in medicine from the University of Athens. He became a doctor, acting in the areas of Kastoria and Florina. He soon became a member of the so-called "New Filiki Etaireia", established by Anastasios Pichion in 1867. His actions were discovered by the Ottoman authorities, which lead to his imprisonment in Monastir. When he was released, he assisted the Macedonian Committee as a military doctor. During the First Balkan War he was appointed as a director of a 150-bed military hospital. Shortly after, in 1914, he volunteered for the Autonomous Republic of Northern Epirus.
