= Macedonian Revolution =

Macedonian Revolution may refer to:

- 1854 Macedonian rebellion
- 1867 Macedonian rebellion
- Razlovtsi insurrection
- Kumanovo uprising
- 1878 Greek Macedonian rebellion
- Kresna–Razlog uprising
- Brsjak revolt
- 1896–1897 Greek Macedonian rebellion
- Ilinden–Preobrazhenie Uprising
- Macedonian Struggle
- World War II in Yugoslav Macedonia
