= Battle of Popköy =

- Part of Russo-Turkish War (1877–1878)
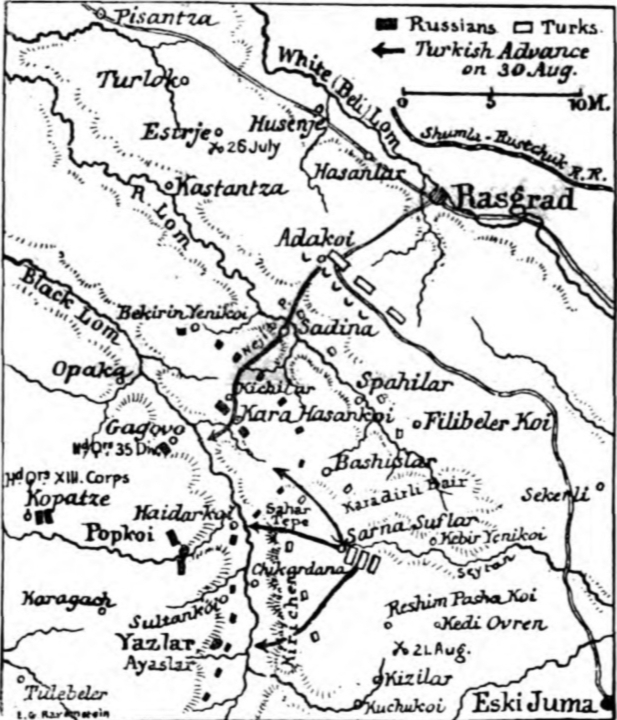
- The battle plan for August 30th concerning the clashes along the Kara Lom.
Date	August 30, 1877
Location	Popköy, Ottoman Empire
Result	Ottoman victory

Belligerents
Ottoman Empire	Russian Empire

Commanders and leaders
(Ottoman Empire) Valentine Baker (Ottoman Empire) George Colville Borthwick	Unknown

Strength
Thousands of soldiers	Thousands of soldiers

Casualties and losses
Unknown	Heavy

The Battle of Popköy was a conflict that took place on August 30, 1877, in Popköy, a village in present-day Bulgaria, between the Russian army and Ottoman forces led by Valentine Baker. It was part of the Russo-Turkish War (1877–1878) and Operation Kara Lom. This battle resulted in an Ottoman victory.

== Background ==
This was a flanking operation launched on the morning of August 30th, following a series of Turkish victories on the Danube front, under the overall leadership of Marshal Mehmed Ali Pasha.

== Battle ==
On the night of August 30, 1877, the Russians had positioned three batteries on the road between Haydarköy and Popköy, and during the battle, they brought two more field guns into action. The three Ottoman batteries on the hill where the Ottoman headquarters was located subjected the Russian batteries to effective fire. As a result of this intense fire from above, one of the Russian guns was put out of action; the crews of the other two guns withdrew. Ottoman field guns kept the retreating Russian troops under fire. All Ottoman guns located on the hills and in the valley opened intense fire. This artillery pressure led to the complete withdrawal of the Russians from Popköy. General Baker Pasha, whose two horses were killed during the fighting, was briefly reported missing but was soon found. The Russian troops in this battle belonged to the Ruse Corps commanded by Alexander Romanov, the Tsar's son. The Ottoman forces formed part of the army of Ahmed Eyüb Pasha, which had come from Razgrad.
