= Vourinos =

Mountain in Greece

- Βούρινος
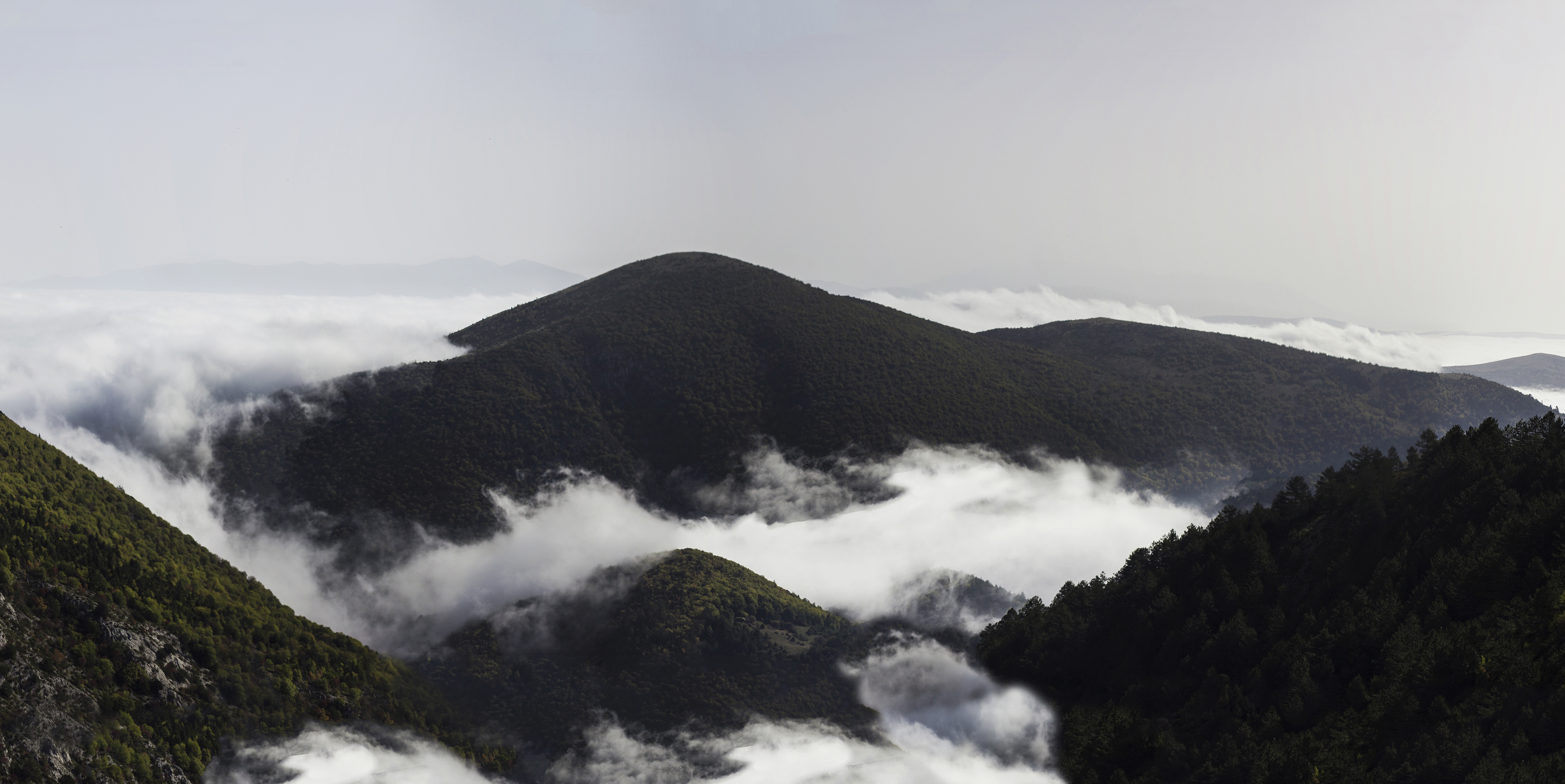

Highest point
- Elevation: 1,866 m (6,122 ft)
- Prominence: 1,136 m (3,727 ft)
- Listing: List of mountains in Greece, Ribu
- Coordinates: 40°10′33″N 21°40′21″E

Naming
- Pronunciation: Greek: [ˈvurinos]

Geography
- Location within Greece
- Location: West Macedonia, Greece

Vourinos (Greek: Βούρινος) is a mountain range covering the eastern Grevena and southern Kozani regional units in Greece. Its highest elevation is 1,866 metres (6,122 ft). Its length is approximately 30 km (19 mi) from northwest to southeast. It is drained by the river Aliakmonas and its tributaries. There are forests on the northern slopes and the lower areas, the higher elevations are covered with grasslands. The nearest mountain ranges are Askio to the north and Kamvounia to the southeast.

The nearest villages are Chromio to the east, Palaiokastro to the northwest and Pontini to the southwest. The nearest larger towns are Grevena to the west and Kozani to the northeast. The A2 motorway (Igoumenitsa - Ioannina - Kozani - Thessaloniki - Alexandroupoli) and the Greek National Road 20 (Kozani - Konitsa - Ioannina) pass along its northern edge.

== History ==
The mountain is known for being one of the two revolutionary outbreaks of the Macedonian Revolution of 1878, demanding the union of Macedonia (then still under the control of the Ottoman Empire) with Greece.
