= Anastasios Pichion =

Greek Aromanian educator and revolutionary of the Macedonian Struggle

- Αναστάσιος Πηχιών/Πηχεών
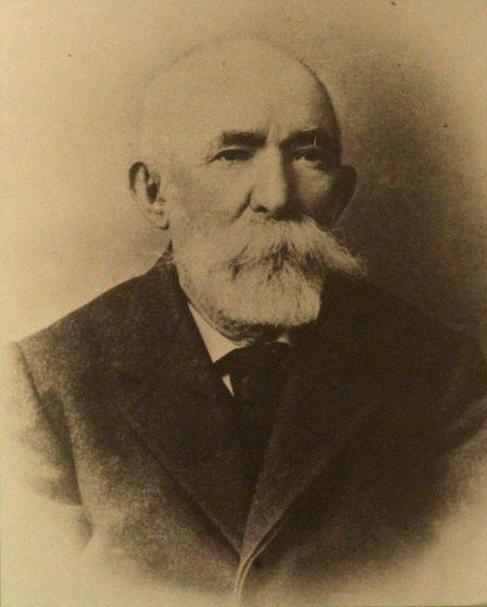
- A portrait of Anastasios Pichion.
- Born: c. 1836; Ohrid, Monastir Vilayet, Ottoman Empire (now Republic of North Macedonia)
- Died: 24 March 1913; Kastoria, Kingdom of Greece
- Education: University of Athens
- Spouse: Aikaterini Konstantinou Papazoglou
- Children: 8 (5 daughters, 3 sons)
- Military career
- Allegiance: Kingdom of Greece
- Branch: HMC
- Conflicts: 1878 Macedonian rebellion Macedonian Struggle
- Awards: Silver Cross of the Order of the Redeemer
- Other work: Greek teacher Professor

Anastasios Pichion (Greek: Αναστάσιος Πηχιών) or Picheon (Πηχεών) (1836 – 24 March 1913) was a Greek educator and revolutionary of the Macedonian Struggle of Aromanian ethnicity.

== Biography ==
He was born in Ohrid in 1836, during the Ottoman period. He was an Aromanian, having been born to Aromanian parents originating from Moscopole or the Moscopole region. Pichion studied in Ohrid and Monastir. He had Margaritis Dimitsas as his teacher, in whose private school, in Monastir, he taught for a while and helped his teacher in writing various of his studies. Demitsas urged him to go, in 1856, to Athens, to finish Middle School there and continue his studies in the University. In 1859 he enrolled in the Faculty of Philosophy of the University of Athens. In order to cover the expenses of his studies, he copied various documents and writings, while during the second year of his studies he received a scholarship from the Vellideian inheritance. He partook in almost all student movement about the Macedonian question as well as the antidynastic demonstrations against the rule of Otto, which led to the fall of the first royal dynasty.

In 1863, Anastasios Pichion accepted the position as a Greek teacher in Kleisoura, Kastoria, where taught the standardised Greek language and culture for two years which helped consolidate Greek influence in the town. In 1865, he was appointed as a teacher in the Greek school of Kastoria. While in Kastoria, Pichion developed strong educational activity, putting effort in the creation of Greek schools and their staffing. He also contributed significantly in the progress of the Pro-education Society of Kastoria ("Φιλοεκπαιδευτικός Σύλλογος Καστοριάς") which was founded in 1872. For this task he was helped materially and morally by some scholars of the age, mainly Anastasios Goudas and Konstantinos Asopios, both Epirotes from Grammeno, Ioannina, the first being a doctor and scholar and the second being a professor of the University of Athens.

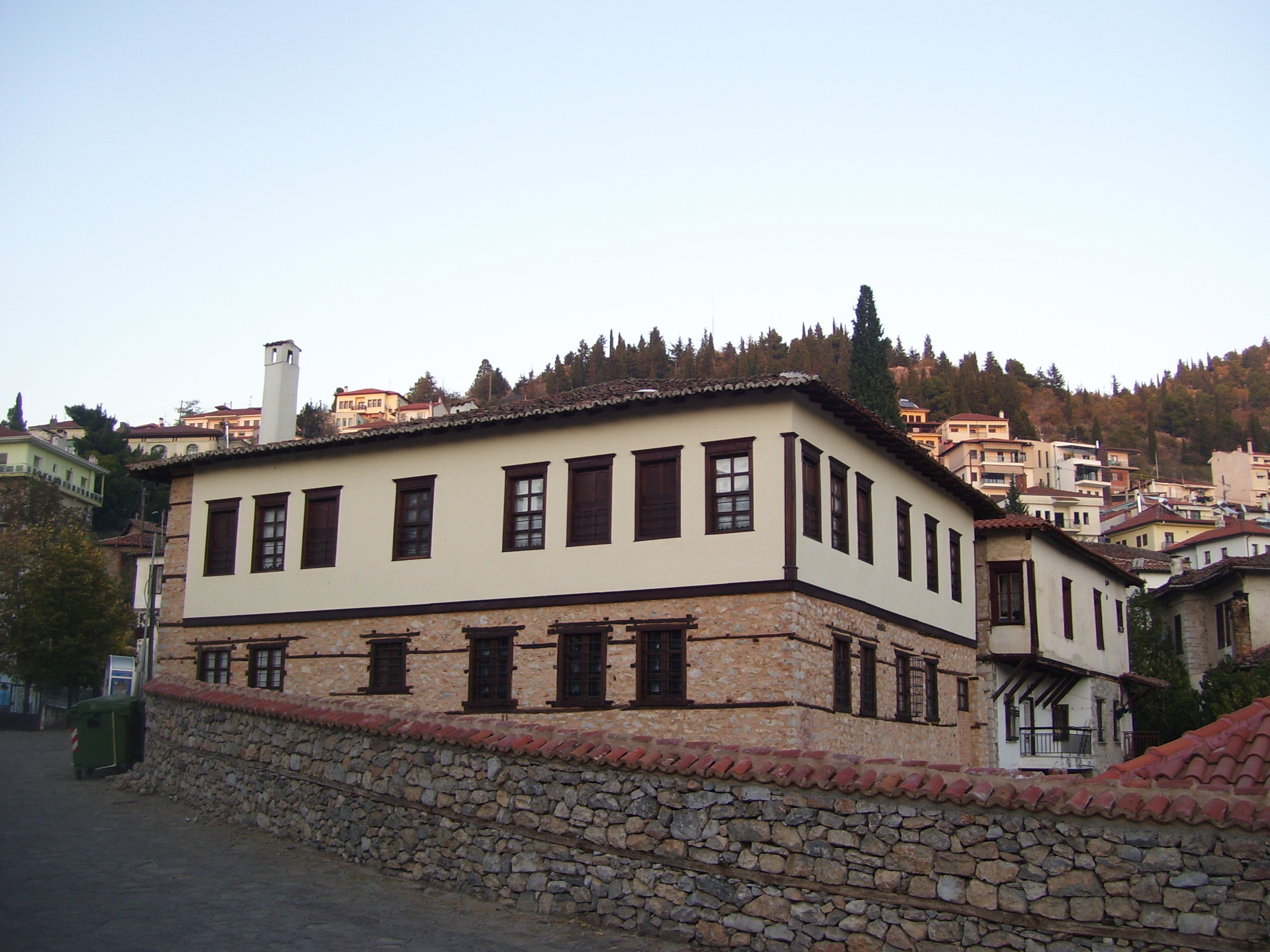
The Picheon mansion in Kastoria, now the Museum of the Macedonian Struggle.

== New Filiki Etaireia ==
In 1867 he founded the National Committee ("Εθνική Επιτροπή"), with Nikolaos Philippides from Monastir, Thomas Pashides from Epirus and Ioannes Argyropoulos from Kleisoura, which quickly expanded from Vogatsiko to Korytsa, with the participation of Ioannes Siomos, Argyrios Vouzas, Nikolaos Toutountzes, Vasileios and Nikolaos Orogopoulos Retzis and Apostolos Sahines.

The New Filiki Etaireia, as it was named after its expansion, aimed to incite an uprising in Macedonia against the Turks. At the start of 1888, 15 Kleisourans and more than 40 Kastorians together with Vogatsians mainly and Korytsans were arrested by the Ottoman authorities and finally led to the prisons of Monastir to be tried. Anastasion Pichion took responsibility and in the end didn't lose his life because of the impact his arrest made internationally. The phrase of the Kastorians as they saw Ioannis Argyropoulos being led to the prisons became proverbial: "...again they brought you doctor!" ("...πάλι σε φέρανε γιατρέ!").

Because of his activities he was imprisoned for six months in Monastir and later transferred to the fortress of Acre, from where he escaped to Athens with the help of the Greek deputy ambassador. After of two years of fruitless effort to find employment, he was appointed as a professor in the Rizareios School, where he taught until 1908. With the amnesty given in 1908 with the Young Turk Revolution he returned to Kastoria.

He died in 1913, a year after the annexation of Kastoria by Greece.

== See also ==
- 1878 Macedonian rebellion
