= 1878 Macedonian rebellion =

Greek rebellion against the Ottoman Empire

1878 Macedonian Rebellion
- Part of Great Eastern Crisis
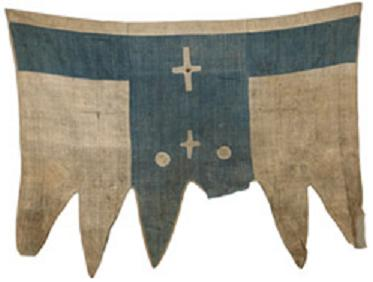
- Revolutionary flag of Western Macedonia
| Date | 19 February – 13 July 1878 |
| Location | Ottoman Macedonia: Salonika Vilayet; Monastir Vilayet; Kosovo Vilayet |
| Result | Rebellion suppressed by the Ottomans; see § Aftermath |

Belligerents
| Greek revolutionaries | Ottoman Empire |

Commanders and leaders
| Kosmas Doumpiotis; Anastasios Pichion | Asaf Pasha |

Strength
| ≈15,000 | Unknown |

The 1878 Macedonian rebellion (Greek: Μακεδονική επανάσταση του 1878) was a Greek rebellion launched in opposition to the Treaty of San Stefano, according to which the bulk of Macedonia would be annexed to Bulgaria, and in favour of the union of Macedonia with the Kingdom of Greece. This followed the brief Greco-Turkish war of 1878 in which Greece had declared war on 2 February against the Ottoman Empire, only for the Greek forces to return to their bases shortly after crossing the border due to the intervention of the Great Powers and the signature of the Treaty of San Stefano.

It is reported that revolutionary outbreaks in the same year, are located alongside Macedonia in Epirus, Thessaly and Crete, seeking union with the Greek state. In Macedonia there was greater willingness and enthusiasm than in Thessaly. The revolution had two main foci in Macedonia, one was on Olympus, and the other in Vourinos.

== Events ==
The revolution of Olympus began in Litochoro on 19 February 1878 led by Kosmas Doumpiotis extended to the surrounding areas and drowned in blood by the Ottomans, with its tragic epilogue being the destruction of Litochoro on March 4 of that year. In the revolution of Litochoro, which was the forerunner to the uprisings across Macedonia, participated bodies from all the regions of Western and Central Macedonia, as well as Eastern Macedonia (mainly from Meleniko).

We have come to proclaim ... that being Macedonians and descendants of those noble bearers of culture to Asia, we in no way wish nor accept that our homeland should become a part of Bulgaria ... We the inhabitants of Stroumnitsa do not wish to be subjected to any Slavic yoke, for we are and wish to be Macedonians and a steadfast member of the great Greek Family ... At all events, we feel that the blood of Philip and Alexander courses through our veins ... we swear on the sacred and holy name of Macedonia and on our honour that to defend our Macedonian homelands we will brandish even our bare chests against the invaders.

— Educational Association of Stroumnitsa, 10 March 1878

The uprising began on Mount Vourinos led by Anastasios Picheon. On 18 February 1878, rebels from different parts of western Macedonia formed, in the Vourinos settlement, (Note: Today, the settlement is abandoned, while its inhabitants moved 4 kilometers to the south, creating the Chromio settlement.) the "Provisional Government of Macedonia", under president E. I. Korovangos, seeking the abolition of the Treaty of San Stefano and the Association of Macedonia with Greece. In the summer of 1878, about 15,000 armed men escalated a guerrilla war in the mountains of Western Macedonia from Kozani to Monastir. The revolutionaries of Western Macedonia had no help from the Greek state.

In northern Macedonia, rebellions went as far as Veles, where the chieftain Katrakos was acting with 50 men. After the suppression of the uprising, many Velesians were forced to resort to Thessaloniki. The revolt ended in the winter of that year due to bad weather and lack of organization.

== Aftermath ==
The Macedonian Revolution of 1878 did not achieve its purpose, but the opposition of the Greek population of Macedonia to the annexation to a Greater Bulgaria was documented internationally, and also the diplomatic position of Greece and those countries opposed to the Treaty of San Stefano was strengthened. So at the Treaty of Berlin in June 1878, the Macedonian territories remained Ottoman and were not annexed to Bulgaria. In response to this development, the Bulgarian population of Macedonia rose similarly in the autumn of 1878 in regions of Kresna and Razlog, but to no avail.
