= Konstantinos Asopios =

Greek scholar and academic teacher

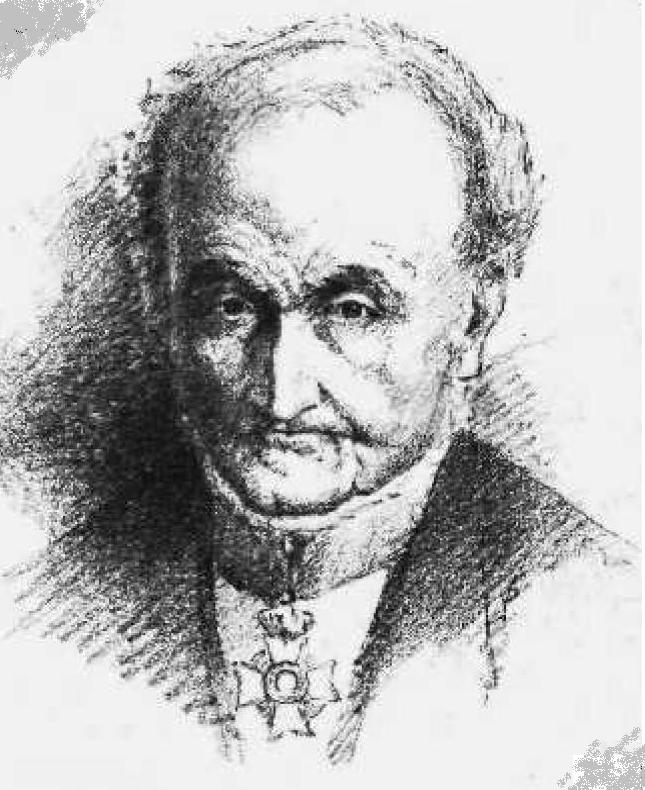
Konstantinos Asopios

Konstantinos Asopios (Greek: Κωνσταντίνος Ασώπιος) was a Greek scholar and academic teacher of the 19th century from Epirus.

== Biography ==
Konstantinos Asopios was born in Grammeno near Ioannina around 1790 as Konstantinos Dsolbas. He grew up poor. After the death of his father, he followed his mother to Ioannina, where she had found work in the Melas family house. Thanks to his good performance at school he received a scholarship by the benefactor Zois Kaplanis. Later, he was given the surname “Asopios” by the school principal, Athanasios Psalidas, which he adopted.

Alongside his studies, he worked as a private teacher and used the earned money to go, together with Christoforos Filitas, to Naples to study medicine. However, a health problem forced him to go to Corfu in 1813 to recover. He went to Venice after his recovery, where he worked as a translator. Later, he moved to Trieste teaching for five years at the Greek school of the city. Subsequently, he studied at the universities of Göttingen, Berlin and Paris at Lord Guilford’s expenses, who knew him from Ioannina, in order to become a professor of the Ionian Academy that the English nobleman intended to found, which he did in 1824.

After the death of Lord Guilford and the decline of the Ionian Academy that followed, Asopios accepted the proposal of the Greek state to join the University of Athens, where he served as a dean three times. He retired in 1866 due to a serious health problem and died on 19 November 1872. A big crowd attended his funeral.

He was married to Eleni Asimakopoulou, whom he met during his stay in Trieste. They had two children, Irinaios and Evridiki.

== Bibliography ==
- Anastasios N. Goudas (1874). Βίοι Παράλληλοι των επί της Αναγεννήσεως της Ελλάδος Διαπρεψάντων Ανδρών, τ. Β'. Αθήνησι: Τύποις Χ. Ν. Φιλαδελφέως.
