= Kosmas Doumpiotis =

Greek politician (1826–1922)

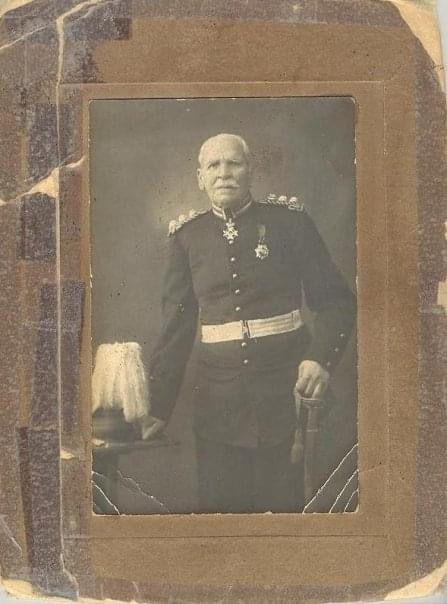
Kosmas Doumpiotis in military uniform

Kosmas Doumpiotis (Greek: Κοσμάς Δουμπιώτης) was a Greek politician. He was born in 1826 in Skopelos. His mother came from Nikiti in Chalkidiki. After the death of his biological father, he was adopted by Asterios Doumpiotis, brother Konstantinos Doumpiotis. As captain of the Hellenic Army he was the leader of the Revolution of Olympus in 1878 that took place in the area of Pieria. After the failure of the revolution he returned to Greece. In 1899 he was elected in Sporades and was temporarily Speaker of the Parliament being the oldest of the members. He died in 1922.
