= Macedonian Struggle =

Cultural and military conflicts in the region of Macedonia

- Part of the decline of the Ottoman Empire
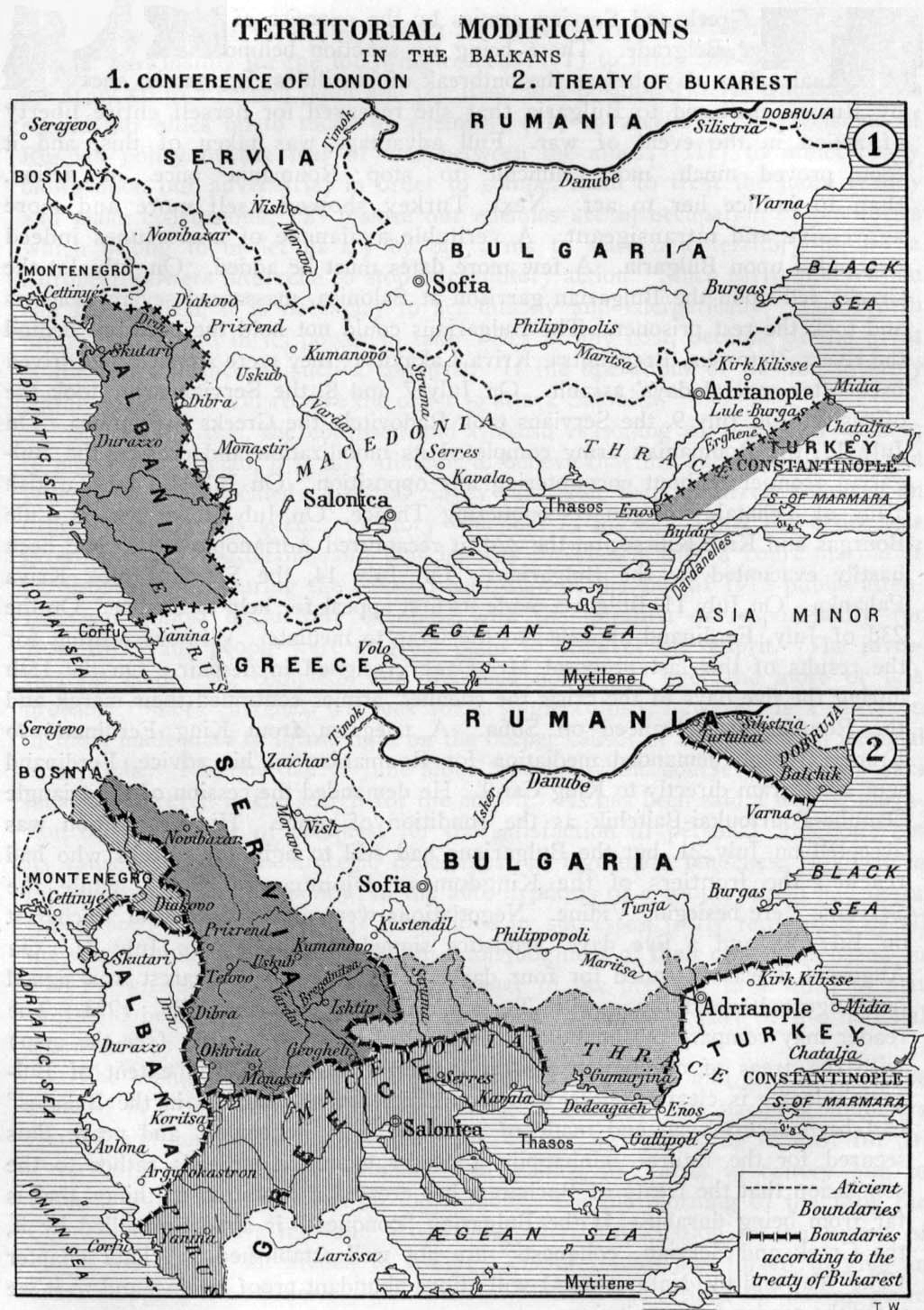
- Borders of the Balkan states before and after the Treaty of Bucharest (1913)
Date	1893–1912 (19 years); Main phase: 1903–1908 (5 years)
Location	Ottoman Macedonia: Salonika Vilayet; Monastir Vilayet; Kosovo Vilayet
Result	Bulgarian and Greek dominance: Weakening of IMRO; Rise of the Serbian Chetniks

Belligerents
HMC; Greek Patriarchate; Supported by: Greece; Serbian Chetniks; Supported by: Serbia; SCMR; Supported by: Romania	IMRO; (Bulgaria) SMAC; (Bulgaria) BSRB; (Bulgaria) Bulgarian Exarchate; Supported by: Bulgaria; Albanian Cheta Ottoman Empire

Commanders and leaders
Ion Dragoumis; Germanos Karavangelis; Lambros Koromilas; Pavlos Melas †; Kottas Christou (executed); Gonos Yiotas †; (Chetniks) Milorad Gođevac; (Chetniks) Gligor Sokolović †; (Chetniks) Jovan Babunski; (Chetniks) Aksentije Bacetić †; Ștefan Mihăileanu †	Gotse Delchev †; Dame Gruev †; Hristo Tatarchev; Yane Sandanski; Vasil Chakalarov; Apostol Petkov †; Marko Lerinski †; Idriz Seferi: (Ottoman Empire) Abdul Hamid II; (Ottoman Empire) Mehmed V; (Ottoman Empire) Hüseyin Hilmi Pasha; (Ottoman Empire) Mahmud Shevket Pasha; (Ottoman Empire) Enver Pasha

Casualties and losses
- 8,000 militants and civilians killed (1903–1908)

The Macedonian Struggle (Note: Macedonian Struggle – Bulgarian: Македонска борба, romanized: Makedonska borba; Greek: Μακεδονικός Αγώνας, romanized: Makedonikós Agónas; Macedonian: Борба за Македонија, romanized: Borba za Makedonija; Serbian: Борба за Македонију, romanized: Borba za Makedoniju; Turkish: Makedonya Mücadelesi) was a series of social, political, cultural and military conflicts that were mainly fought between Greek and Bulgarian subjects who lived in Ottoman Macedonia between 1893 and 1912. From 1904 to 1908 the conflict was part of a wider guerrilla war in which revolutionary organizations of Greeks, Bulgarians and Serbs all fought over Macedonia and its Christian population. Particularly over the national affiliation of the Slavic-speaking population which was forced to declare themselves for either of the sides. Gradually the Greek and Bulgarian bands gained the upper hand. Though the conflict largely ceased by the Young Turk Revolution, it continued as a low intensity insurgency until the Balkan Wars.

== Background ==
Initially the conflict was waged through educational and religious means, with a fierce rivalry developing between supporters of the Ecumenical Patriarchate of Constantinople (Greek-speaking or Slavic/Romance-speaking people who generally identified as Greek), and supporters of the Bulgarian Exarchate, which had been recognized by the Ottomans in 1870. Starting from the 1870s, Bulgaria, Greece and Serbia intensified their competition for the allegiance of the Christian Slavic-speaking population of Macedonia, most of whom was yet to develop a national consciousness. The construction of churches and schools was used as mean of conducting intense propaganda campaigns through which the "proper" national sense was implanted amongst the Christian peasants, so that the territorial claims over Macedonia can be validated. Different national movements could manipulate data and information in order to realize their nationalist agendas due to the absence of collective ethnic identity between the Macedonian people. Nevertheless, at the dawn of the 20th century, most of the local population did not develop a clear sense of national identity at all, they would only take national identities when they were forced by the nationalist education, propaganda and terror campaigns.

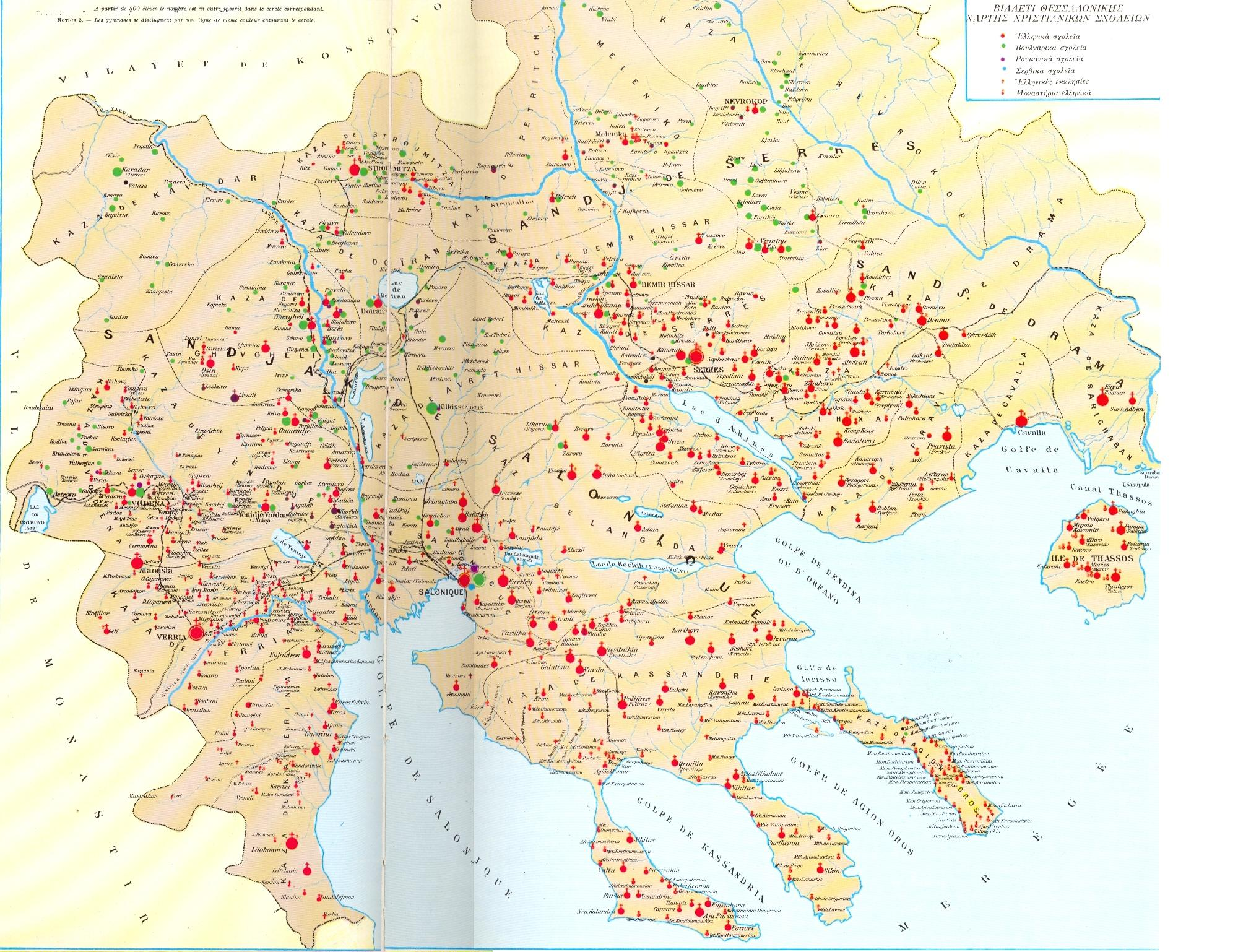
A 1903 map of the Salonika Vilayet depicting Greek (red), Bulgarian (green), Romanian (purple), and Serbian (blue) schools, in addition to Greek churches (red cross) and monasteries (red cross on red dot)

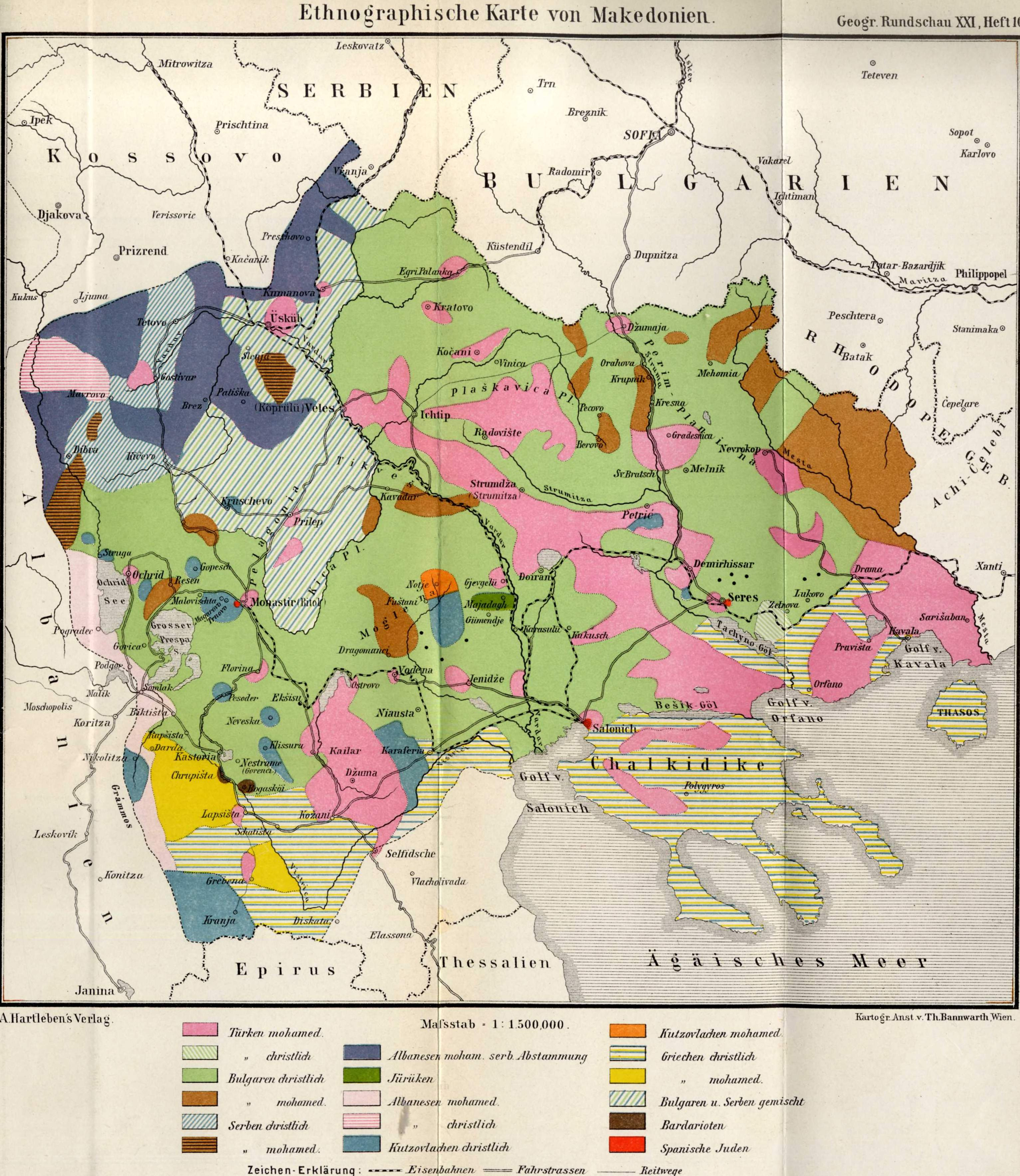
Austrian ethnographic map from 1899 depicting Christian Bulgarians (light green), Christian Greeks (horizontal blue and yellow stripes), Bulgarians and Serbs mixed (diagonal blue and yellow stripes), Christian Serbs (diagonal blue and white stripes), Christian Aromanians (light blue)

As Ottoman rule in the Balkans crumbled in the late 19th century, competition arose between Greeks and Bulgarians (and to a lesser extent also other ethnic groups such as Serbs, Aromanians and Albanians) over the multi-ethnic region of Macedonia. (Note: Clogg (1992). p. 70: "For the last two decades of the nineteenth century and the first of the twentieth, Macedonia, with its inextricably mixed populations of Greeks, Bulgars, Serbs, Albanians, Turks and Vlachs, was to be the focus of the competing nationalisms of Greece, Bulgaria and Serbia, as each sought to carve out as large a stake as possible of the crumbling Ottoman possessions in the Balkans.") The Bulgarians founded in 1893 the Internal Macedonian Revolutionary Organization (initially known as Bulgarian Macedonian-Adrianopolitan Revolutionary Committees) which coordinated the majority of Bulgarian actions in the region. The defeat of Greece in the Greco-Turkish War of 1897 was a loss that appalled Greeks which led to the dissolution of the Ethniki Eteria, by Prime Minister Georgios Theotokis. With little prospect of liberation by Greece, the Macedonian Greeks took their fate into their own hands and began to form various armed bands that would ultimately fall under the control of the Hellenic Macedonian Committee. The region quickly became a constant battleground among various armed groups, with hostilities peaking in 1904-1908. The main struggle was waged over securing the national interpreted affiliation of the population to the Exarchate or the Patriarchate, by using violent and terrorist actions over the population. Thus, easily claimed were Slav-speaking Exarchists as Bulgarians and Greek-speaking Patriarchists as Greeks, but the main issue arose with the Slav-speaking Patriarchists who were claimed as Bulgarians based on the language and Greeks cause of the church affiliation. Also, the Slav-speaking population in the northwest of Macedonia was claimed as Serbs. The Slavic population was forced to declare themselves for either of the sides, thus became divided into Bulgarophiles, Grecomans and Serbomans. It was common for whole villages to change the church affiliation, based on which side offered free or cheap education or by force with violent methods from the armed bands. Same families could have members affiliated to different "nationalities", an individual could pass through multiple religio-national orienation. The Ottoman Army was also involved in the conflict and perpetuated atrocities against the Christian population in attempt to quell the unrest. Due to the Christian population of Macedonia, whether Greek, Serb, Bulgarian or Aromanian, engaging in more or less constant rebellion against the Ottoman Empire, in conjunction with the revolutionary activities of Armenian nationalists in Anatolia, many Ottoman officers believed that all Christians of the empire were disloyal and treasonous. However, the majority of Macedonian people were more concerned with surviving the terror caused by the plundering of nationalist bands than with following any specific ethnic ideology.

== Bulgarian activity ==
=== Internal Macedonian Revolutionary Organisation ===
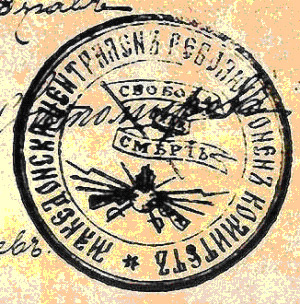
Seal of the CC of the Internal Macedonian Revolutionary Organization containing the motto Svoboda ili smart.

In 1893, Internal Macedonian-Adrianople Revolutionary Organization (IMARO) had been founded in Thessaloniki. (Note: For further on this, see: Sherman (1980). p. 10: "The revolutionary committee dedicated itself to fight for 'full political autonomy for Macedonia and Adrianople'. Since they sought autonomy only for those areas inhabited by Macedonians, they denied other nationalities membership in IMRO. According to Article 3 of the statutes, 'any Bulgarian could become a member'."; Lange-Akhund (1998). p. 39: "As a Bulgarian historian, Pandev underlined the fact that, since its foundation the organization chose its Bulgarian identity by selecting the name 'Bulgarian revolutionary committees'."; Bechev (2009). "Introduction": "The IMARO activists saw the future autonomous Macedonia as a multinational polity, and did not pursue the self-determination of Macedonian Slavs as a separate ethnicity. Therefore, Macedonian (and also Adrianopolitan) was an umbrella term covering Bulgarians, Turks, Greeks, Vlachs, Albanians, Serbs, Jews, and so on. While this message was taken aboard by some Vlachs as well as some Patriarchist Slavs, it failed to impress other groups for whom the IMARO remained the 'Bulgarian Committee'.".) Initially its membership was allowed only for Bulgarians, but later it opened itself to all ethnic groups in Macedonia and Adrianople regions. Earlier on, IMARO claimed that it was fighting for the autonomy of Macedonia and not for annexation to Bulgaria. However, many of the members of the organization saw Macedonian autonomy as an intermediate step to unification with Bulgaria, (Note: Among others, the memoirs of the IMRO revolutionary Kosta Tsipushev are used, in which Tsipushev, citing Delchev, writes that autonomy was only tactics for that time, with the eventual aim being future unification with Bulgaria.) but others saw as their aim the creation of a Balkan federal state, with Macedonia as an equal member. In practice, most of the followers of the IMARO were native Macedonian Bulgarians, though they also had some Aromanian allies, like Pitu Guli, Mitre The Vlach, Ioryi Mucitano and Alexandru Coshca. In April 1903, a group known as the Boatmen of Thessaloniki, with assistance from the IMARO, blew up the French ship Guadalquivir and the Ottoman Bank in Thessaloniki. In August 1903, the IMARO organised the Ilinden Uprising in Macedonia and the Preobrazhenie Uprising in the Adrianople Vilayet which led to the formation of the short-lived Kruševo Republic and Strandzha Republic. The uprisings were ultimately suppressed by the Ottoman Army with the subsequent destruction of many villages and the devastation of large areas in Western Macedonia and around Kırk Kilise near Adrianople. Following the failed Ilinden–Preobrazhenie Uprising the IMARO ultimately weakened due to a split into and a pro-Bulgarian nationalist right-wing faction (centralists) and a left-wing faction (federalist) who continued to favor autonomous Macedonia as part of a Balkan Federation. The previous events motivated Greece and Serbia to increase their revolutionary and educational activities and take a more direct role in achieving their agendas.

=== Bulgarian efforts ===
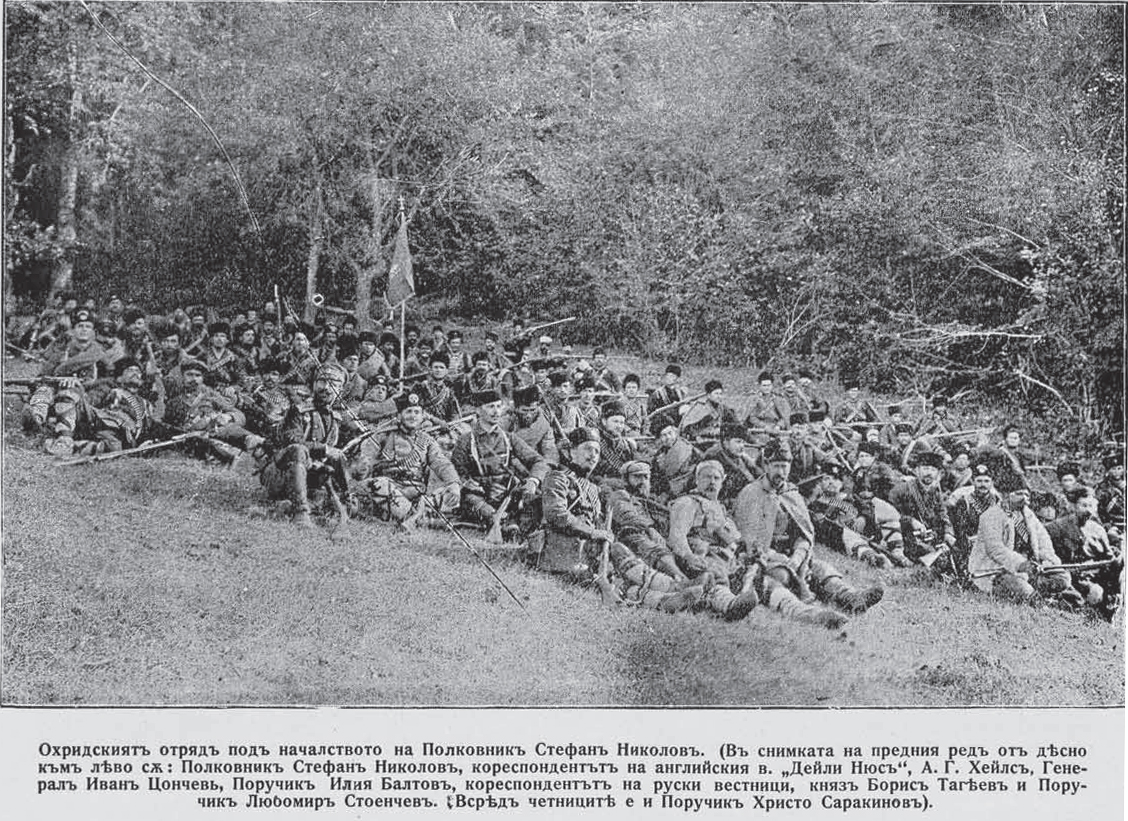
A Supreme Macedonian Committee's cheta during the Ilinden Uprising.

Already from 1895 the Supreme Macedonian-Adrianople Committees were formed in Sofia in order to reinforce the Bulgarian actions in Ottoman Empire. One of Komitadjis' first activities was the capture of the predominantly Greek town of Meleniko (today Melnik, Bulgaria), but they couldn't hold it for more than a few hours. Bulgarian bands destroyed the Pomak village of Dospat where they massacred local inhabitants. This kind of activity alerted Greeks and Serbians, who made a farce of the slogan "Macedonia for the Macedonians", being against the constitution of Macedonia as separate state. In the following years SMAC activists as well as the activists of another smaller group formed in Sofia called the Bulgarian Secret Revolutionary Brotherhood, started to infiltrate the IMARO. They would later become the core of the IMARO right-wing, and through them the Bulgarian government would assume control over IMARO after 1903. As Bulgarian efforts intensified, they started to affect European public opinion.

== Greek activity ==
=== Hellenic Macedonian Committee ===
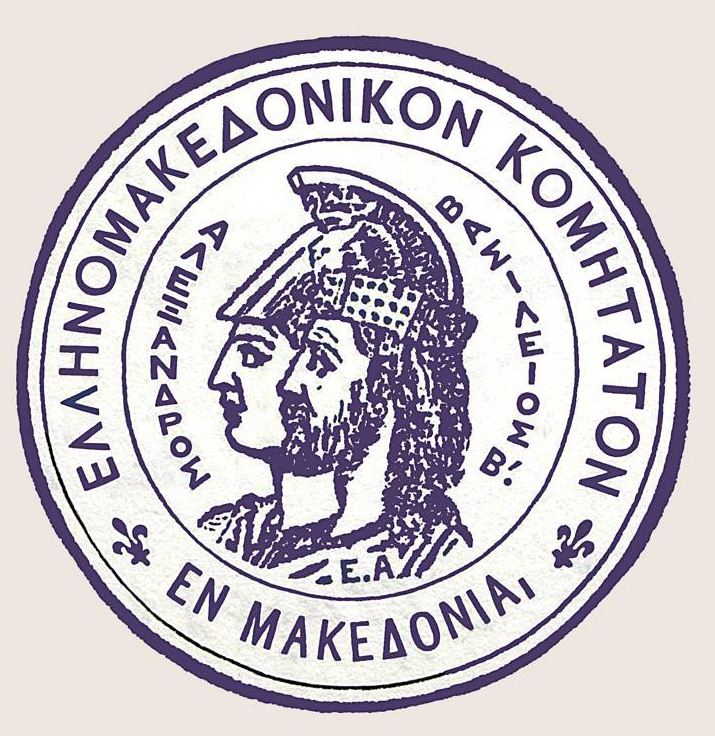
Seal of the Greek Macedonian Committee depicting Alexander the Great and Byzantine Emperor Basil II

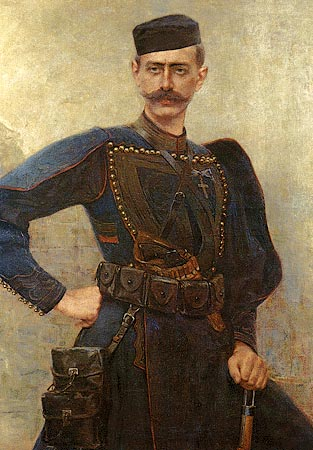
Pavlos Melas in Macedonomachos uniform

In order to strengthen Greek efforts for Macedonia, the Hellenic Macedonian Committee was founded in 1903 by Stefanos Dragoumis and functioned under the leadership of publisher Dimitrios Kalapothakis. Its members included many Greek notables in addition to the fighters. Among its members were Ion Dragoumis and Pavlos Melas. Its fighters were known as Makedonomachoi ("Macedonian fighters").

Under these conditions, in 1904 a vicious guerrilla war broke as response of IMRO activities between Bulgarian and Greek bands within Ottoman Macedonia. The Bishop of Kastoria, Germanos Karavangelis, who was sent to Macedonia by Nikolaos Mavrokordatos, the ambassador of Greece, and Ion Dragoumis, the consul of Greece in Monastir, realised that it was time to act in a more efficient way and began to organise the intensification of the Greek opposition.

While Dragoumis concerned himself with the financial organisation of the efforts, the central figure in the military struggle was the very capable Cretan officer Georgios Katechakis. Bishop Germanos Karavangelis travelled to raise morale and encourage the Greek population to take action against the IMRO. Many committees were also formed to promote the Greek national interests.

Katechakis and Karavangelis succeeded in the recruitment and organization of guerrilla groups that were later reinforced with volunteers from Greece. Volunteers often came from Crete and the Mani area of the Peloponnese. They even recruited former IMRO members, taking advantage of their political and/or personal disputes within the organisation. Additionally, officers of the Hellenic Army were encouraged to join the struggle to provide experienced leadership, as many had served in the Greco-Turkish War of 1897. The officers who elected to join provided a logistical advantage to the Makedonomachoi. The Macedonian Greeks, however, would form the core of the fighting force and proved to be the most important fighters due to their knowledge of the region's geography and some possessing knowledge of the Bulgarian language. Many local Greeks, such as Periklis Drakos, were also involved in the smuggling and stashing of weapons and ammunition around the region.

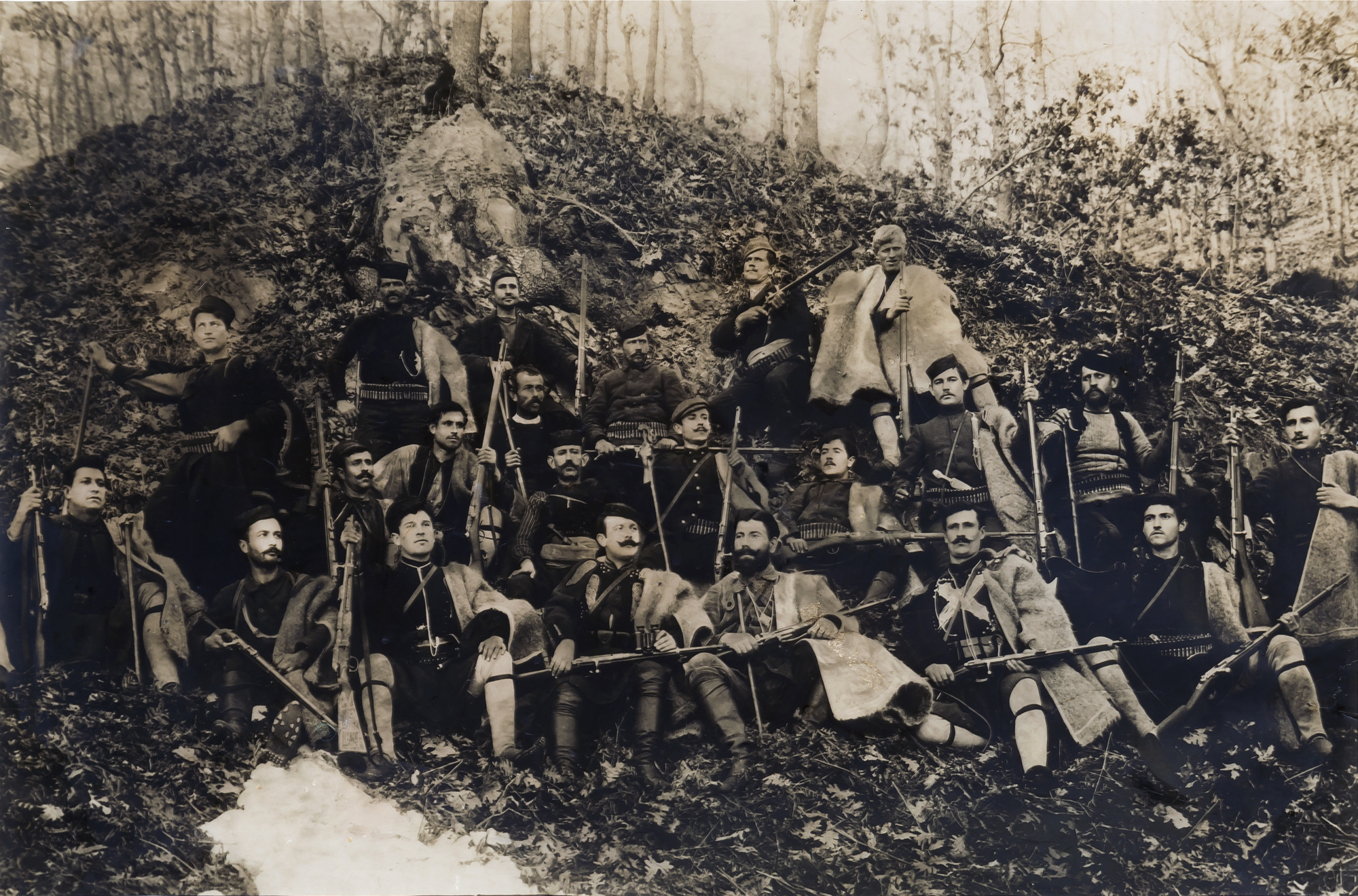
Greek armed band (Athens War Museum Collections)

=== Greek efforts ===
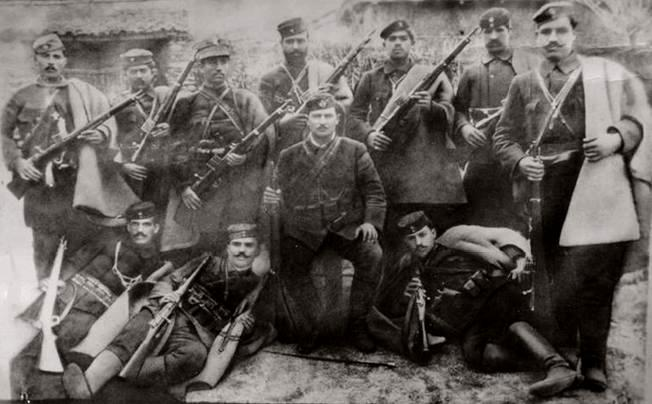
Periklis Drakos from Kavala with co-fighters

The Greek state became concerned, not only because of Bulgarian penetration in Macedonia but also due to Serbian interests, which were concentrated mainly in Üsküp and Monastir area. The rioting in Macedonia, especially the death of Pavlos Melas in 1904, caused intense nationalistic feelings in Greece. This led to the decision to send more volunteers to reinforce and better organise the armed bands and thwart the Bulgarian efforts to bring all of the Slavic-speakers of Macedonia on under their influence.

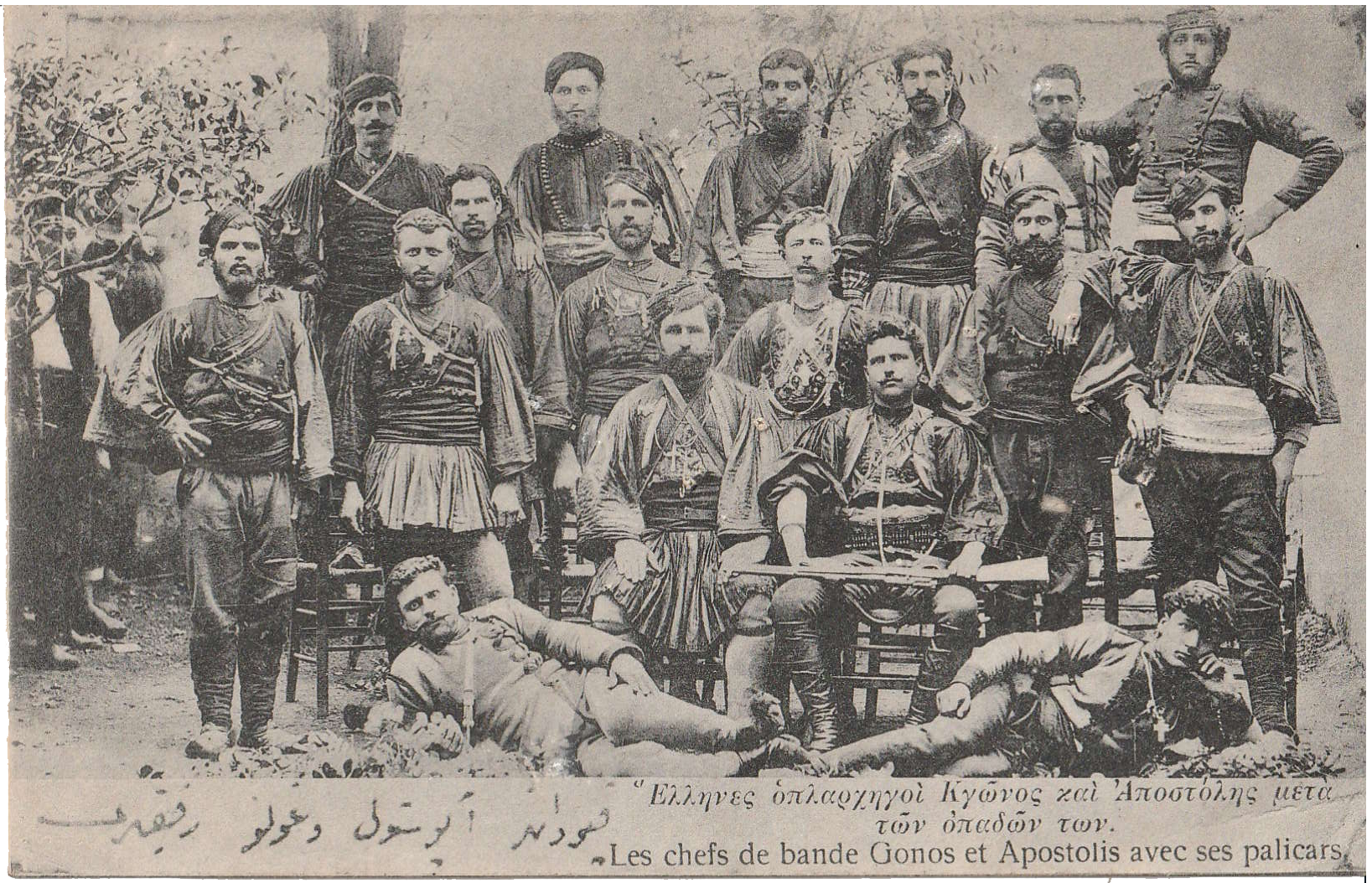
The band of Gonos Yiotas (seated right) and Apostolis Matopoulos (seated left).

The Greek General Consulate in Thessaloniki, under Lambros Koromilas, became the centre of the struggle, coordinating the Greek bands, distributing, and nursing the wounded. Fierce conflicts between the Greeks and Bulgarians started in the area of Kastoria, in the Giannitsa Lake area, and elsewhere. During 1905, guerrilla activity increased and the Makedonomachoi gained significant advantage within 10 months, extending their control towards the areas of Mariovo and East Macedonia, Kastanohoria (near Kastoria), the plains north and south of Florina and the routes around Monastir. However, from early 1906 the situation became critical and the forces of the Makedonomachoi were forced to withdraw from various areas. Nevertheless, the groups of Tellos Agras and Ioannis Demestichas had some success in the marsh of Giannitsa. There were great advances of the Serb forces, joined by Muslim Slavs, in summer of 1906 in the northern areas of the Sanjak of Üsküp.

While the armed bands confronted the Ottoman Army, the Ottoman administration often ignored the activities of the Greek guerrillas, and according to Dakin assisted them against the Bulgarians outright. However, once the subversive potential of the Bulgarians had been neutralised, Ottoman policy ended the favourable neutrality to the Greek side and embarked upon relentless persecutions against the Greeks. During the course of the conflict Greek armed bands numbered 2,000 men. Of whom over 700 were killed in action along with 1,250 pro-Greek civilians.

== Aromanian activity ==
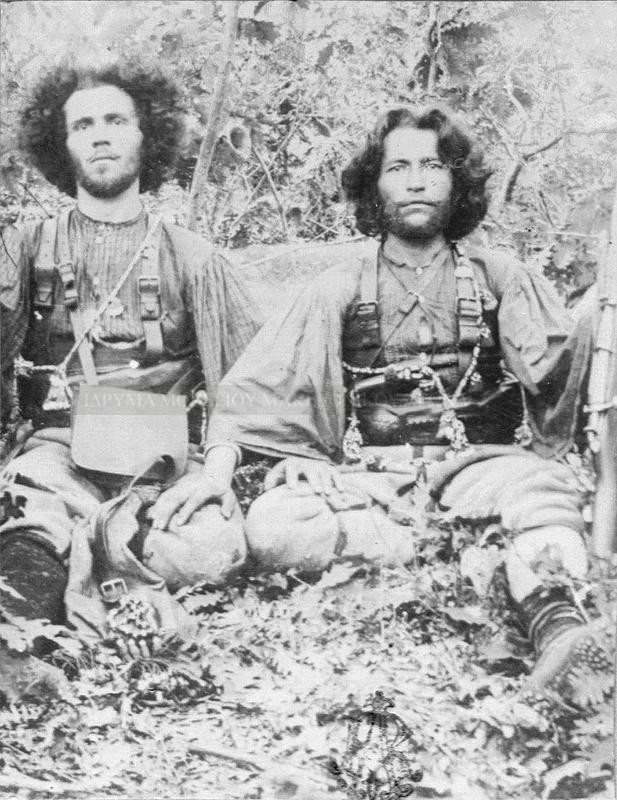
Aromanian revolutionaries in Veria

The Greek–Romanian conflict concerning the Aromanians reached its climax during the Macedonian Struggle, with Aromanians being no longer divided into pro-Greek and pro-Romanian factions but into "Greeks" and "Romanians" proper. The pro-Greek faction was the largest and most powerful.

=== Pro-Greek Aromanians ===
Most Aromanians during the Macedonian Struggle were pro-Greek, supporting the Greek revolutionaries and the Ecumenical Patriarchate of Constantinople. These Aromanians escaped or resisted the influence of Romanian interventionism, in which a considerable amount of money was spent on by the Romanian state. They were indifferent or even hostile to their national movement. In the archives of the Greek Foreign Ministry there are numerous testimonies from Aromanian communities denouncing Romanian "propaganda" and proclaiming their Greekness. In Veria, there was a small local unit which was under the leadership of a pro-Greek Aromanian, Tasos Koukotegos. This unit, being small and somewhat isolated, had been operating without definite objectives, but it proved to be very important for the Greek cause as it helped in fights against local Turkish chiefs, pro-Romanian Aromanians, and Bulgarian komitadjis. Additionally, local support from pro-Greek Aromanians in Kastoria empowered Greek activity in the region. A notable Greek makedonomachos of Aromanian descent was Anastasios Pichion.

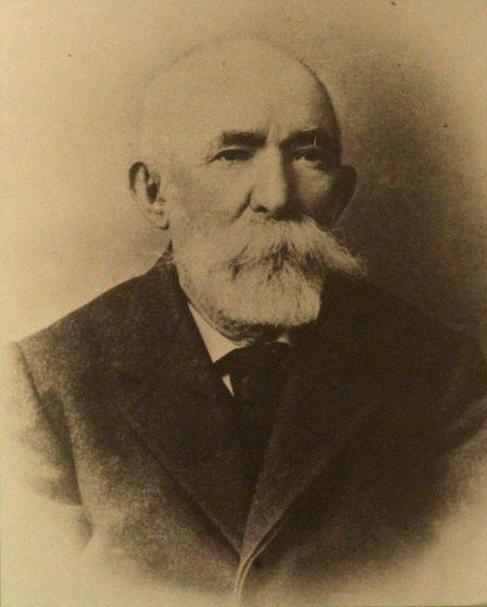
Anastasios Pichion, a pro-Greek Aromanian

In Pelagonia, the pro-Greek sentiments of Aromanians during the Macedonian Struggle contributed to their displacement. When they migrated to Greece, they were already financially ruined.

=== Pro-Bulgarian Aromanians ===
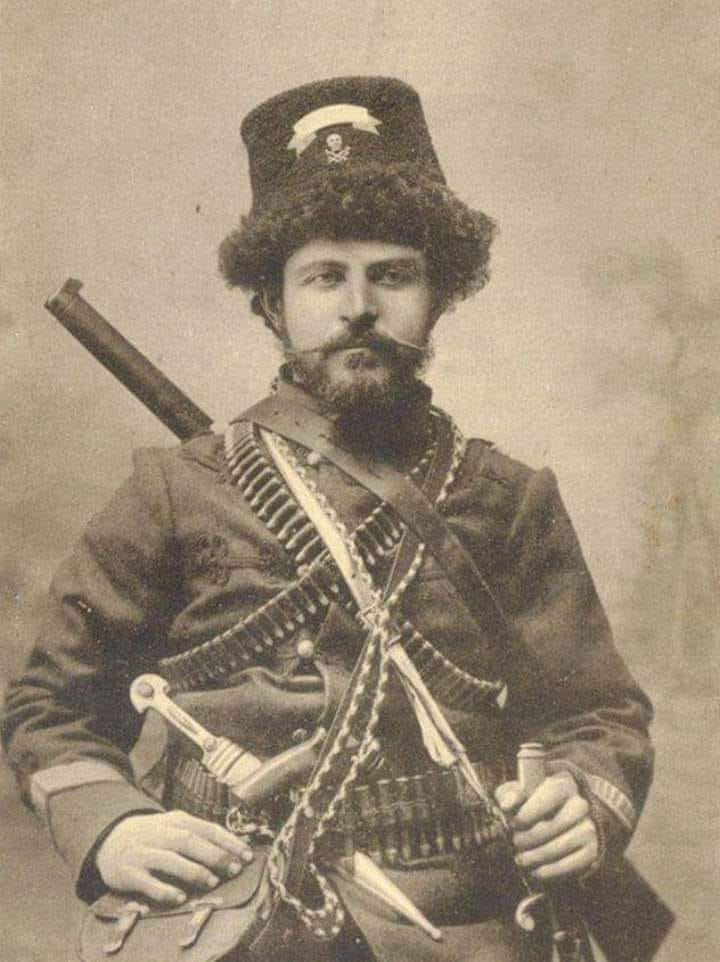
Pitu Guli, a pro-Bulgarian Aromanian

Many Aromanians were also pro-Bulgarian, joining their efforts in the struggle. They were aligned with the Bulgarian Exarchate rather than the Ecumenical Patriarch of Constantinople and sympathized with the goals and aspiration of the Bulgarian cause. Some notable pro-Bulgarian Aromanians include Pitu Guli and Mitre Pangiaru.

=== Pro-Romanian Aromanians ===
As the Bulgarians had managed to introduce their language in church services and education in the Ottoman Empire, so did the pro-Romanian Aromanians start demanding the same rights. The Greek Ecumenical Patriarch of Constantinople reacted strongly to this however amid increased rivalry in the region and eight Aromanian churches were closed by his personal order in 1875. This produced protests from the pro-Romanian Aromanians to the Ottoman and Romanian government, and also increased tensions between the pro-Romanian Aromanians and the Greeks as well as with pro-Greek Aromanians, which led to physical violence that often ended in fatalities.

In 1903, following the failure of the Ilinden–Preobrazhenie Uprising in which many pro-Romanian Aromanian and Bulgarian soldiers had fought with the aim of creating a Macedonian autonomy, the Ottoman Empire allowed the intervention of Greek militias, known as andartes and formed within Greece with commanders from the Greek state, to suppress potential renewed attempts of this objective. These commanders began to threaten the leaders of various Romanian schools in Aromanian villages, warning them that if they did not close down their activities, they would be attacked. Given this, some pro-Romanian Aromanian fighters referred to as armatoles (armatoli, armatol in singular) began to take up arms, the first ones being Mihail Handuri from Livadia (Giumala de Jos or Livãdz) and Hali Joga from Ano Grammatiko (Grãmãticuva), who having been joined by various young pro-Romanian Aromanian fighters, began to attack Greek bands in the area of Edessa and Veria. These pro-Romanian Aromanian bands were allied with Bulgarian bands in Ottoman Macedonia. In 1906, under Ioryi Mucitano, they were organized into two committees, one in Bucharest led by Alexandru Coshca and Sterie Milioru and the other in Sofia led by Mucitano. He decided to divide their area of operations into districts led by a so-called voivode. These bands were allowed free passage by Bulgarian villages.

=== Clashes ===
Starting from summer of 1904, clashes between pro-Romanian Aromanian and ethnic Greek or pro-Greek Aromanian bands, be it only between themselves or with other combatants involved, erupted in the village of Condusula (between Edessa and Naousa), Ano Grammatiko, Pyrgoi and Dervent. Pro-Greek schools and churches were destroyed by the pro-Romanian Aromanians and pro-Greek Aromanians retaliated by doing the same to pro-Romanian schools and churches. The two factions expelled each other and even murdered opponent schoolteachers and clergy. One such case took place in 1911, when komitadjis and pro-Romanian Aromanians murdered Emilianos Lazaridis, Metropolitan of Grevena. Another example is Haralambie Balamaci, an Aromanian priest murdered in 1914 by Greek andartes.

Greeks and pro-Greek Aromanians suffered attacks from Turkish troops and bashibazouks who killed 41 of them and destroyed 366 and 203 of their houses and shops respectively.

== Albanian activity ==
=== Conflict with Serbian Chetniks ===
In 1907, Idriz Seferi came into conflict with Serbian Chetniks that were operating in Eastern Kosovo. Radivojević and his Serbian Chetnik band were sent across Kosovo as aid to fight the Internal Macedonian Revolutionary Organization at Vardar, they were all wearing Albanian clothes with the plan to reach Poreče disguised as Albanian kachaks. However, they were discovered and in July, Seferi fought and killed Nikolić and Rade Radivojević, both high ranking Serbian Chetniks, along with their entire Četa in Pasjane and Gjylekar.

=== Conflict with the Ottomans ===
Albanian rebels entering Üsküp (Skopje)

In July, during the Albanian revolt of 1912, the Albanian rebels gathered their forces in Kosovo after successfully capturing major cities in the region, including Pristina, Ferizaj, and Gjakova, which were previously under control of the Ottoman Empire. As early August approached, Albanian troops embarked on a southwards march to the provincial capital, Üsküp (Skopje). A four-day battle ensued, which ended in an Albanian Victory and the capture of Üskup by Albanian rebels. Following this battle, Albanian rebels from the Karadak Mountains (Skopska Crna Gora), under Idriz Seferi, marched on Kumanova and Preševo, liberating both of them. Meanwhile, a smaller unit marched towards Tetovo, also capturing it for the Albanians.

== Crimes ==
War crimes were committed by both Bulgarians and Greeks during the Macedonian Struggle. According to a 1900 British report compiled by Alfred Biliotti, who is considered to have heavily relied on Greek intelligence agents, starting from 1897, the members of the Exarchist committees had embarked upon a systematic and extensive campaign of executions of the leading members of the Greek side. Moreover, Bulgarian Komitadjis, pursued a campaign of extermination of Greek and Serbian teachers and clergy. On the other hand, there were attacks by Greek Andartes on many Macedonian Bulgarian villages, with the aim of forcing their inhabitants to switch their allegiance from the Exarchate back to the Patriarchate and accept Greek priest and teachers, but they also carried out massacres against the civilian population, especially in the central parts of Macedonia in 1905 and in 1906. One of the notable cases was the massacre at the village Zagorichani (today Vasiliada, Greece), which was a Bulgarian Exarchist stronghold near Kastoria on 25 March 1905, where between 60 and 78 villagers were killed by Greek bands.

Andartes bands also committed acts of violence against Aromanians with pro-Romanian affiliations, with over 400 of them killed following the proclamation of the Ullah millet in May 1905 according to Romanian Aromanian professor Alexandru Gica. These bands were composed not only of ethnic Greeks, but also of pro-Greek Aromanians; violence also occurred in the opposite direction, though it was far less frequent as stated by Gica. These recurrent episodes of violence were one of the reasons why Greece and Romania suspended diplomatic relations between 1906 and 1911.

According to British reports on political crimes (including the above-mentioned Biliotti report), during the period from 1894 to 1912 over 4000 political murders were committed (66 before 1901, 200 between 1901 and 1903, 3300 between 1903 and 1908 and 600 between 1908 and 1912), excluding those killed during the Ilinden Uprising and the members of the Bulgarian and Greek bands. Of those who were killed, 53% were Bulgarians, 33.5% were Greeks, Serbs and Aromanians together 3.5% and 10% were of unknown ethnicity.

These conflicts decreased their intensity after the revolution of Young Turks in July 1908, as they promised to respect all ethnicities and religions and to provide a constitution.

== Consequences ==
The success of Greek efforts in Macedonia was an experience that gave confidence to the country. It helped develop an intention to annex Greek-speaking areas, and bolster Greek presence in the still Ottoman ruled Macedonia.

The events in Macedonia, specifically the consequences of the conflicts between Greek and Bulgarian national activists, including Greek massacres against the Bulgarian population in 1905 and 1906, gave rise to pogroms against the ca. 70,000–80,000-strong Greek communities that lived in Bulgaria, who were considered to share responsibility for the actions of the Greek guerrilla groups.

Nevertheless, the Young Turk movement resulted in a few instances of collaboration between Greek and Bulgarian bands, while this time the official policy in both countries continue to support the penetration of armed fighters into Ottoman Macedonia, but without having fully ensured that there would be no attacks on each other.

== Commemoration and historiography ==
Museums dedicated to the conflict include Museum for the Macedonian Struggle in Thessaloniki (housed in the former Greek consulate), Kastoria and Chromio in Greek Macedonia, and Museum of the Macedonian Struggle in Skopje, North Macedonia.

There have been fiction and non-fiction accounts of the events of the struggle and its participants, including:

- Greek writer Penelope Delta wrote the novel Τά μυστικά τοῦ Βάλτου [Ta Mystiká tou Váltou; The Secrets of the Swamp] about the fighting around the Giannitsa Lake.
- Germanos Karavangelis published his memoirs as Ὁ Μακεδονικός Ἀγών [The Macedonian Struggle].
- The 1973 Greek film Pavlos Melas depicts the life and death of Pavlos Melas.
- Albert Sonnichsen, an American volunteer in the IMRO depicted Bulgarian activities in the book Confessions of a Macedonian Bandit: A Californian in the Balkan Wars.

== See also ==
- Macedonian Question
- List of Macedonian Revolutions
