= Ahmed Eyüb Pasha =

Ottoman military commander (1833–1893)

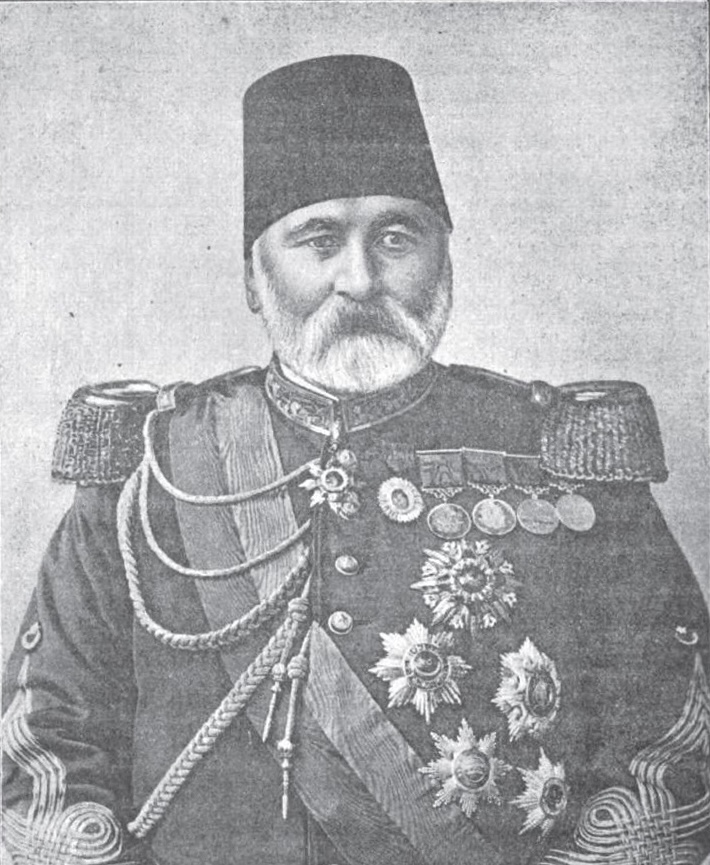
- Born: Ahmed Eyüb; 1833
- Died: 1893 (aged 59–60)
- Military career
- Allegiance: Ottoman Empire
- Branch: Ottoman Army
- Rank: General
- Conflicts: Russo-Turkish War (1877–78)

Ahmed Eyüb Pasha (Modern Turkish: Ahmet Eyüp Paşa; 1833–1893) was an Ottoman military commander, who participated in the Russo-Turkish War (1877–78).

Eyüp Pasha was born in Istanbul in 1833. He studied at the War School. He joined the army as a staff captain in 1858. He distinguished himself among his friends and rose to the rank of Mirliva, or Pasha, in a short period of eleven years. After performing many military services, he became the commander of the seventh army and governor of the Yemen vilayet in 1873 with the rank of marshal. He participated in the 1877-1878 Ottoman-Russian wars. He served as marshal of the fifth and later the third army. In 1885, he was appointed governor of Yanya (Ioannina) and general commander of the Greek border. While he was the governor of Kosovo, he was exiled to Istanbul. He was given the duty of attending the Friday greetings of Sultan Abdulhamid II in Istanbul. On May 28, 1893, Marshal Ahmet Eyüp Pasha died.
