= Museum of the Macedonian Struggle (Kastoria) =

Museum of the Macedonian Struggle of Kastoria
- Μουσείο Μακεδονικού Αγώνα Καστοριάς
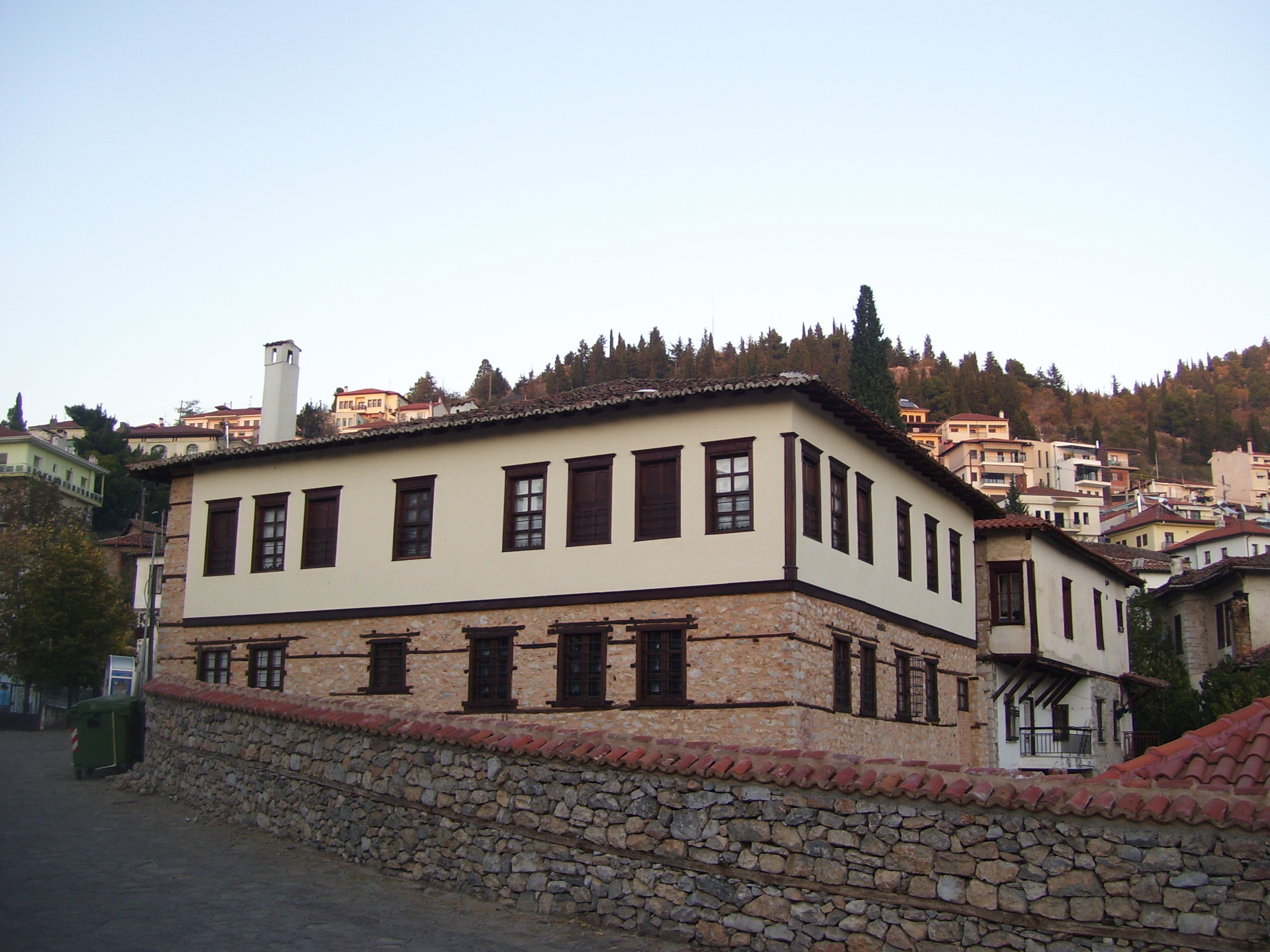
- Outside view
- Established: 23 May 2010
- Location: Kastoria, Macedonia, Greece
- Coordinates: 40.5169°N 21.2719°E
- Type: Military museum
- Founder: Friends of the Museum of the Macedonian Struggle in Kastoria

The Museum of the Macedonian Struggle (Greek: Μουσείο Μακεδονικού Αγώνα Καστοριάς) in Kastoria, Macedonia, Greece is housed in a traditional old mansion that belonged to the teacher and fighter Anastasios Pehion (1836–1913). It was inaugurated on 23 May 2010, a project of the "Friends of the Museum of the Macedonian Struggle in Kastoria" that was founded in 1993 in the Municipality of Kastoria.

== Description ==
The Museum outlines the Greek revolutionary movements that came into being in Macedonia when it was under Ottoman rule and lasted until its liberation and unification with Greece in 1913. With rich iconographic material and artefacts, it focuses mainly on the crucial (for Macedonian Hellenism) period around 1878. At that time there were uprisings and insurgencies in Western Macedonia by the local Greeks in an effort to abrogate the Treaty of San Stefano, to overthrow the Ottoman rule and be united with Greece.

The Museum has a library, a local history reading room and a multiple-use hall in which cultural events are held.

== Gallery ==
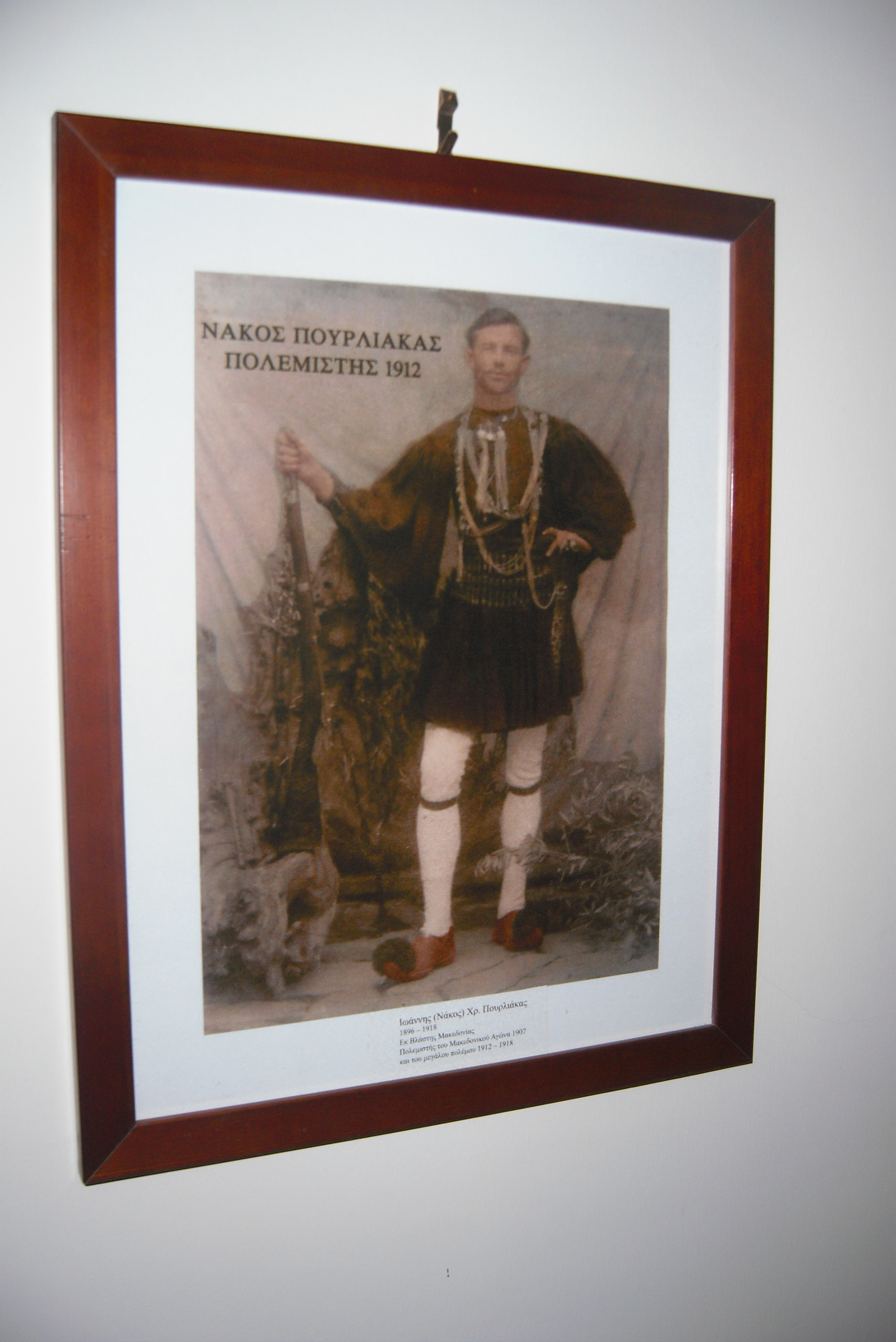
Ioannis "Nakos" Porliakas Portrait

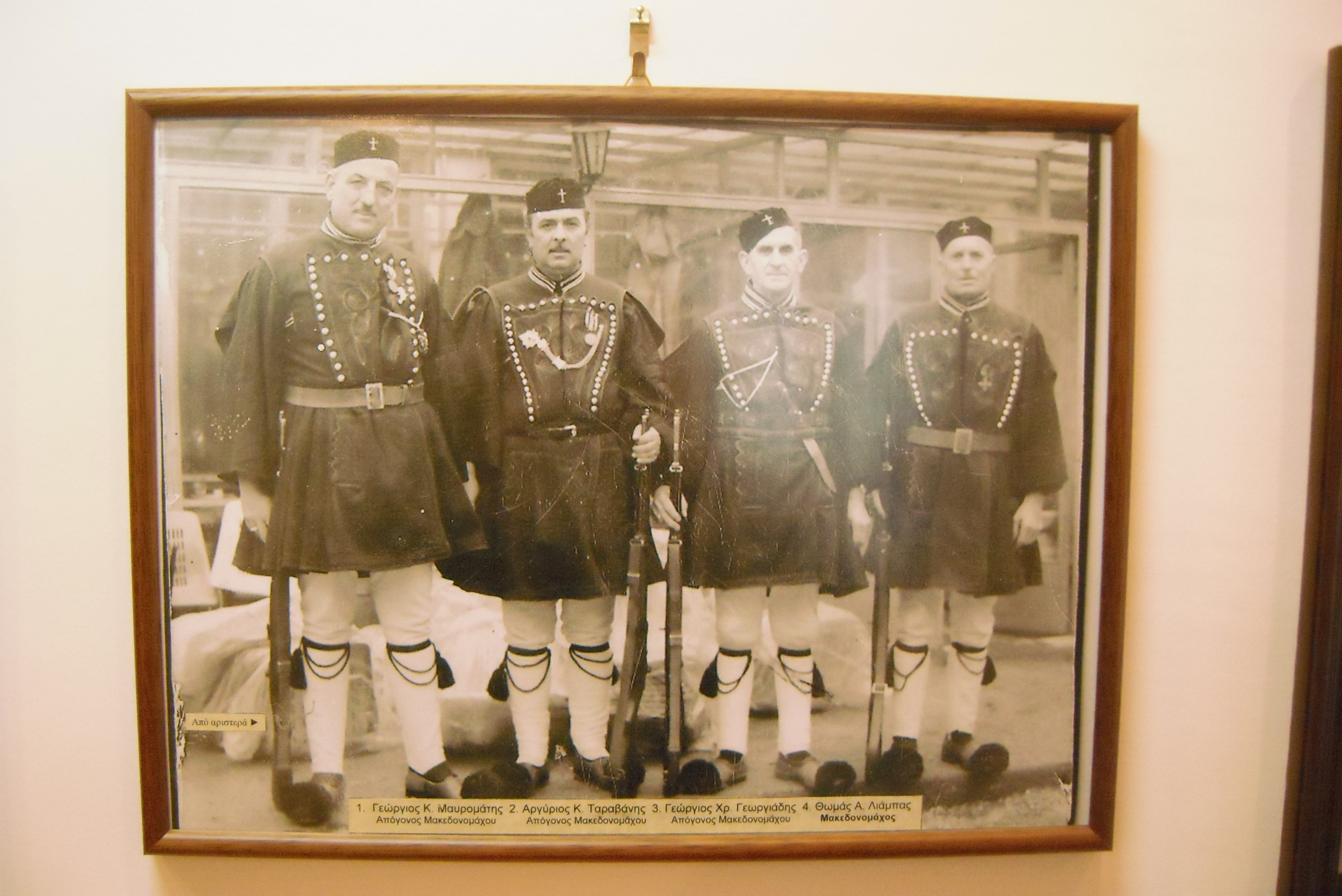
Macedonian Fighters from Kastoria region

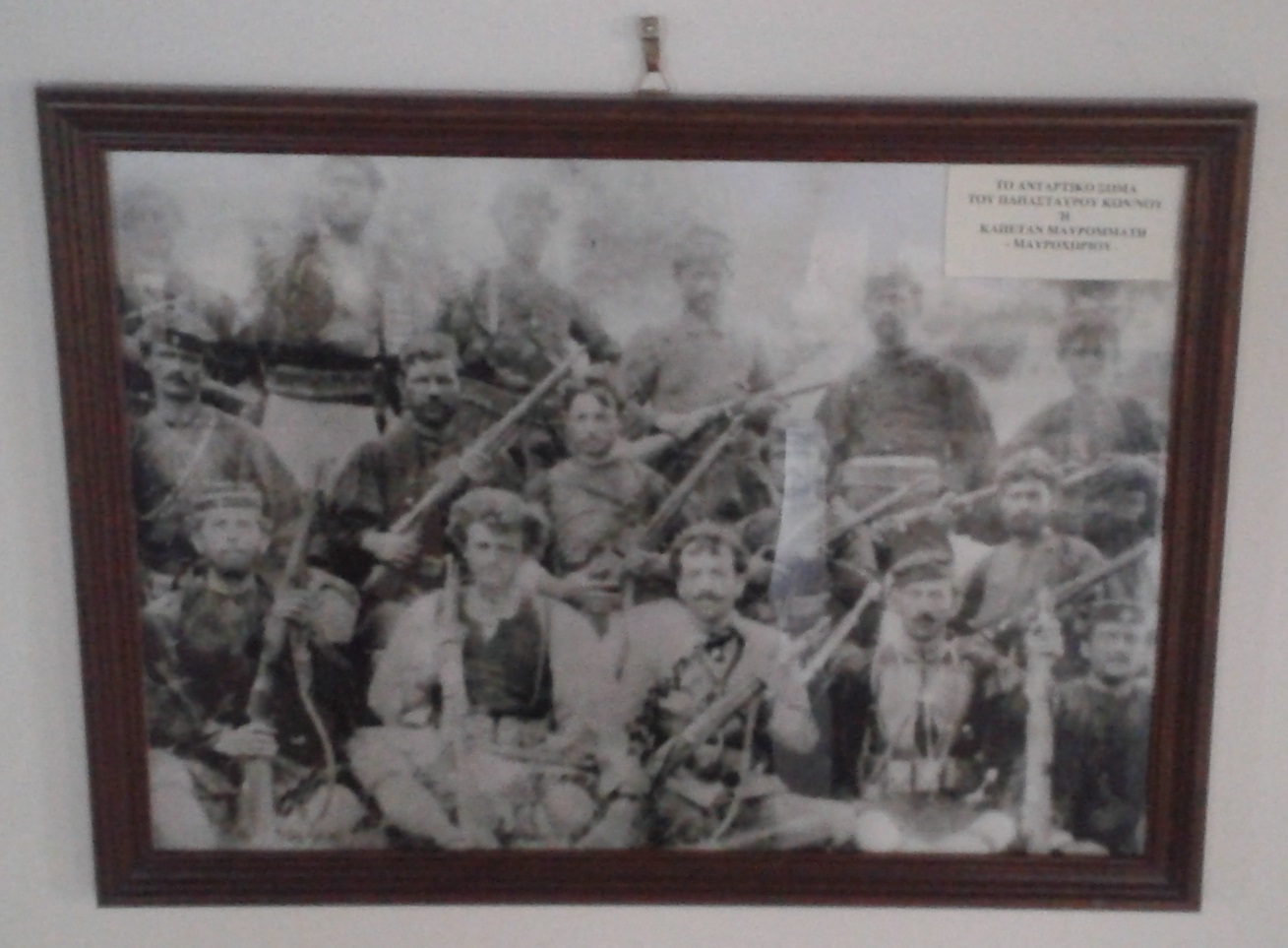
Band of Konstantinos Papastavros from Mavrovo

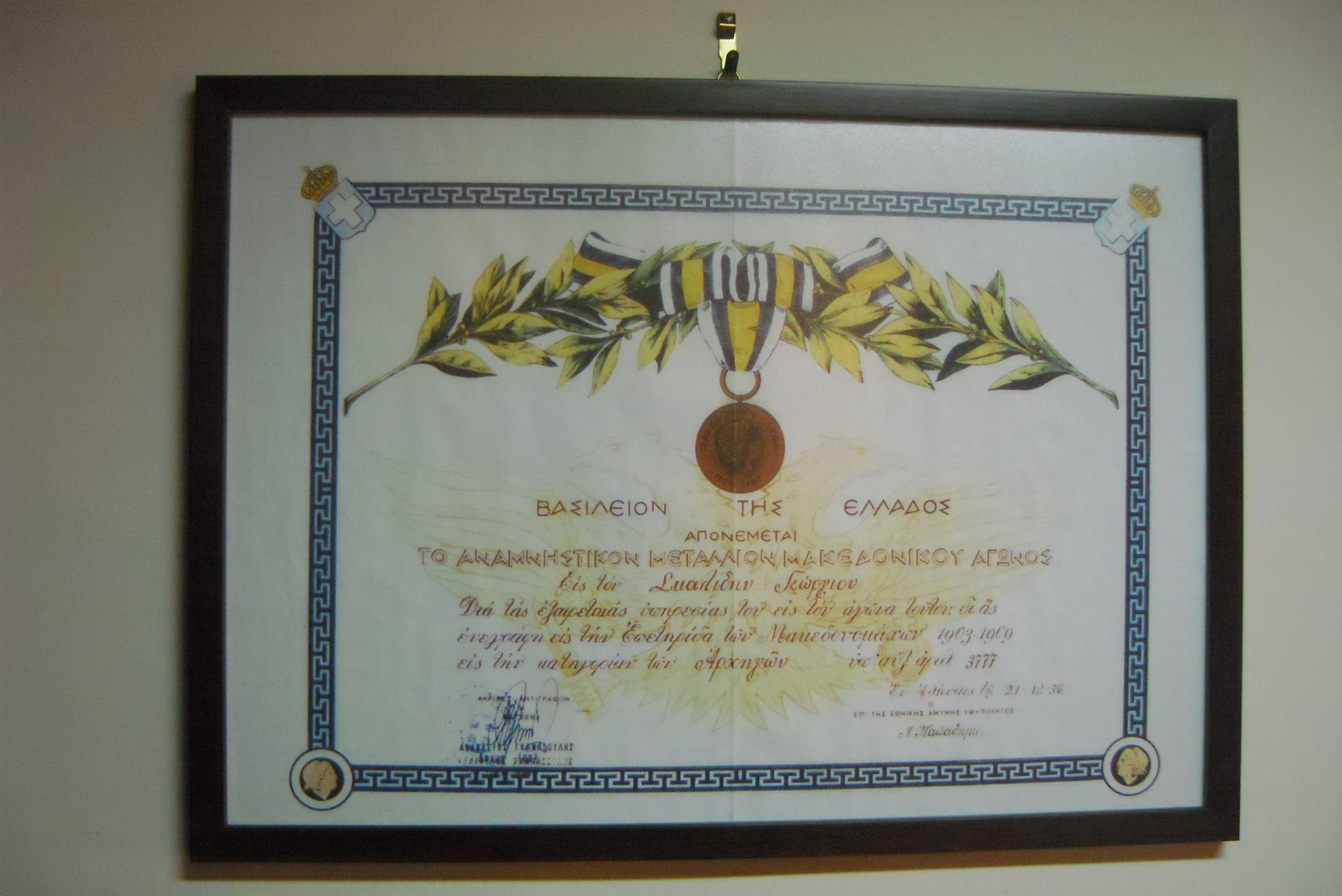
Georgios Skalidis Diploma

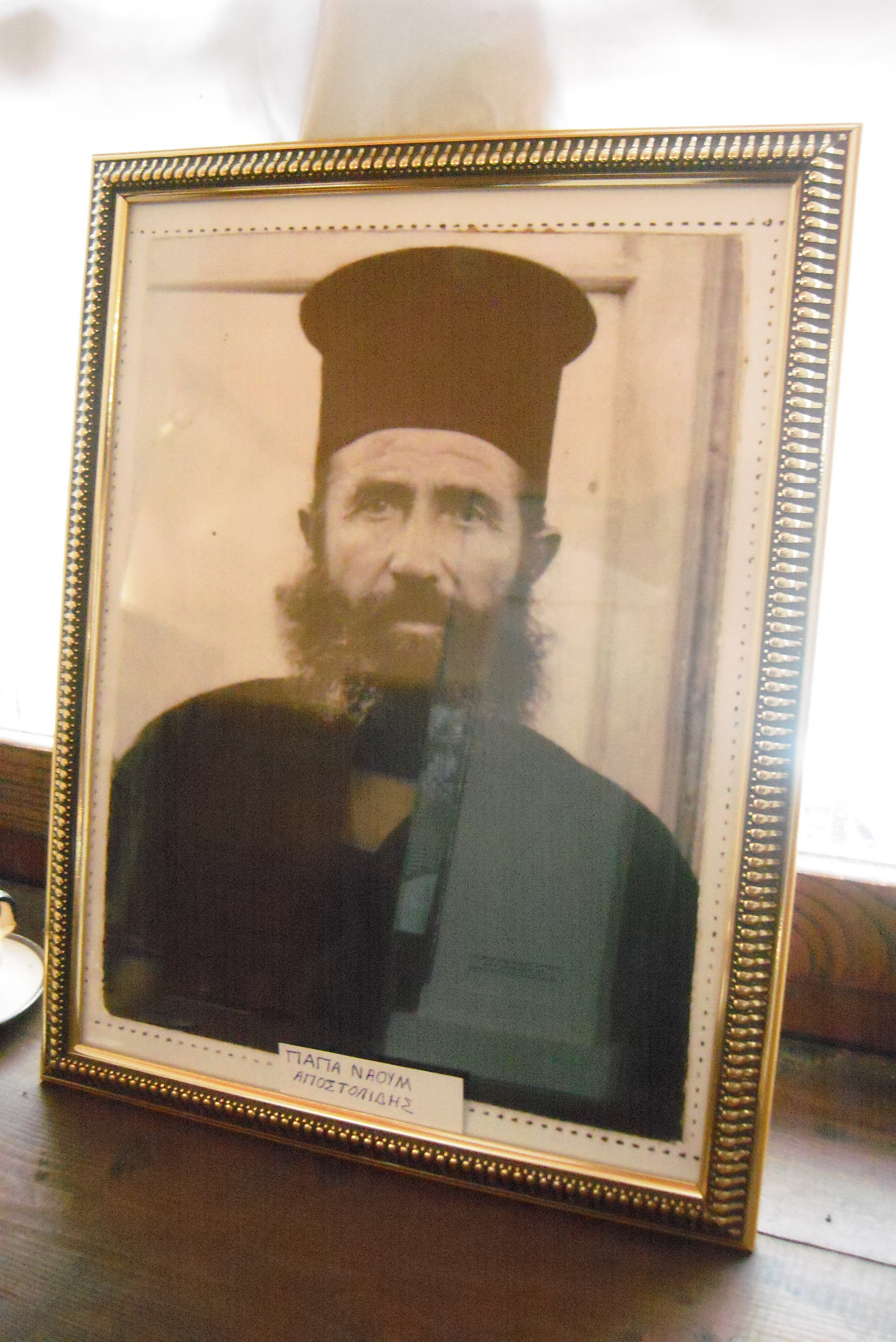
Naoum Apostolidis Portrait
