= Chromio =

Community in the Kozani regional unit in the Greek region of Macedonia

Chromio Χρώμιο
- Community
- Location within Greece
- Coordinates: 40°08′04″N 21°44′26″E
- Country: Greece
- Administrative region: Western Macedonia
- Regional unit: Kozani
- Municipality: Kozani
- Municipal unit: Aiani

Population (2021)
  - Community: 99
- Time zone: UTC+2 (EET)
  - Summer (DST): UTC+3 (EEST)
- Postal code: 50150
- Area code: +30 2461

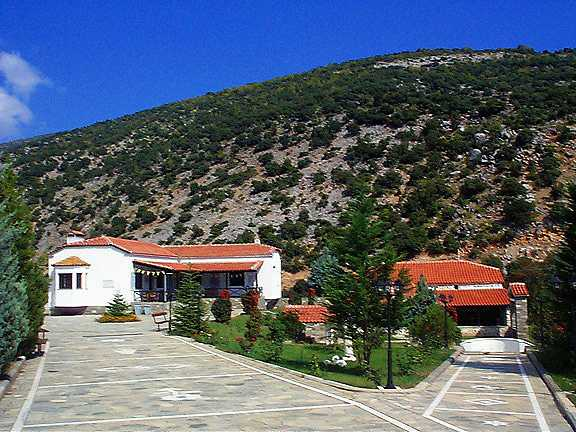
Museum of the Macedonian Struggle, Cheomio, West Macedonia, Greece

Chromio, known before 1927 as Sfiltsi (Σφίλτσι), is a community located in Aiani municipal unit, municipality of Kozani, Kozani regional unit, in the Greek region of Macedonia. It is situated at an altitude of 640 meters above sea level. At the 2021 census, the population was 99.

The Monastery of Agia Trias Larious is in Chromio.
