= Nikis Square =

Central square of Kozani, Greece

Coordinates: 40°18′05″N 21°47′17″E

Nikis Square (Greek: Plateia Nikis) is Kozani's central square. It is approximately in the middle of the town, 470 km north-west from Athens, 120 km south-west from Thessaloniki. Koventaron street is to the north, Tsontza street is to the west, Eirinis avenue is to south and Pavlou Mela street is to the east.

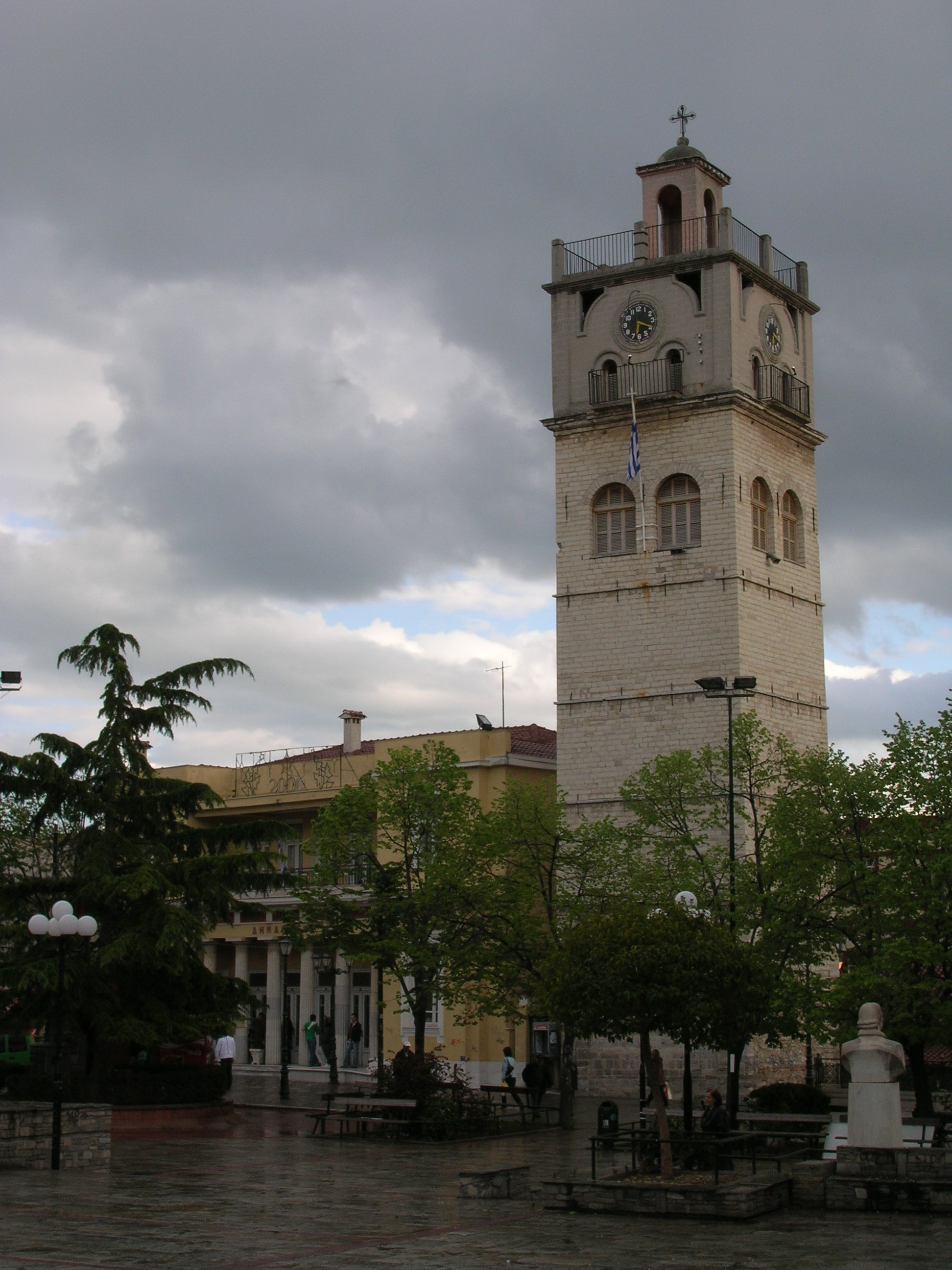
The clocktower in the southern part of Nikis Square

A lot of events take place every year in Nikis square. Many neo-classical buildings lie around it, like the town hall to the south, the Ermioneion Hotel to the west, and the National bank of Greece building to the north. Next to the town hall lies the old church of Saint Nicolas, Kozani's patron, and between them stands the clock tower. The clock tower, or Mamatsios (from the last name of the donor of the clock), was built in 1855, and is 26 metres tall. It is the symbol of Kozani and its bells can be heard in most parts of the town centre.

There are some statues in the square, e.g. the statue of Georgios Sakellarios, of Georgios Lassanis and of Bishop Ioakeim.

== See also ==
- Plateia
