= West Channel =

The term West Channel may refer to

- West Channel (East River), a section of the East River in New York, N.Y.,
- West Channel (TV), a TV Channel in Greece.
