= Agios Dimitrios Power Plant =

Largest power plant in Greece

Agios Dimitrios Power Station
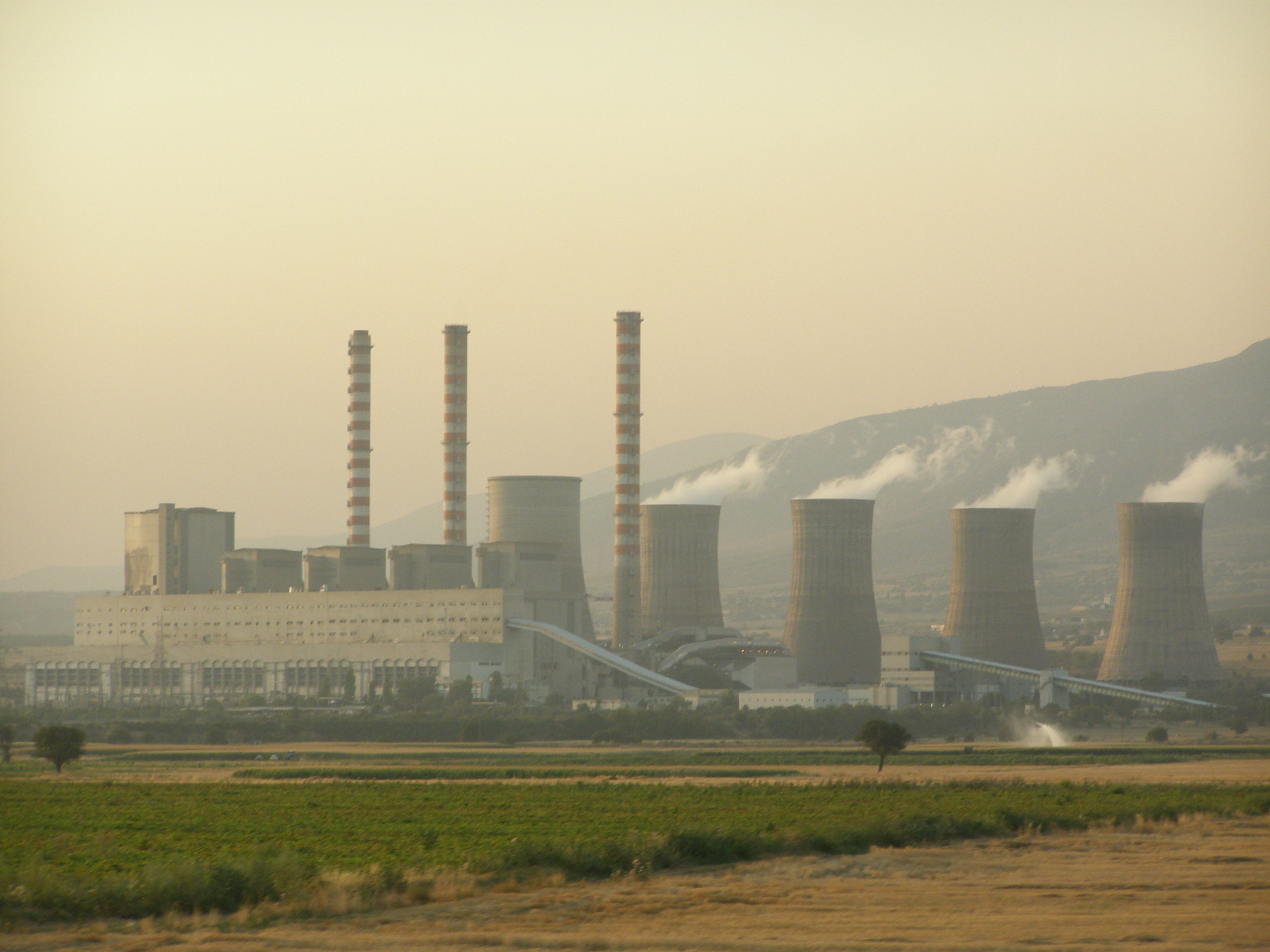
- Country: Greece
- Location: Agios Dimitrios, Kozani
- Coordinates: 40.393757°N 21.925106°E
- Commission date: 1984
- Owner: Public Power Corporation of Greece
- Operator: Public Power Corporation

Thermal power station
- Primary fuel: Lignite
- Cogeneration?: Yes
- Thermal capacity: 70 MW

Power generation
- Units operational: 2 × 300 MW; 2 × 310 MW; 1 × 365 MW
- Make and model: Alstom; LMZ; Electrosila; Ansaldo
- Nameplate capacity: 1,585 MW

External links
- Commons: Related media on Commons

Agios Dimitrios Power Station is a power plant located near Agios Dimitrios, Kozani, Greece, situated between the towns of Kozani and Ellispontos village. In terms of its location in relation to a metropolis, the plant lies 140 kilometres (87 mi) west of Thessaloniki, a major city in northern Greece.

The Agios Dimitrios Power Station was the largest of Greece's power plants, generating a total capacity of 1,600 MW from two 300 MW units (Units I and II), two 310 MW units (Units III and IV), and one 365 MW unit (Unit V). In terms of physical size, the three flue gas stacks of the facility are 200 metres (660 ft) tall. The plant burned lignite extracted through opencast mining, a process undertaken at the Lignite Center of Western Macedonia, which is located in the Ptolemais-Amynteo region, the main coal mining area of Greece. It was shut down in 2026.

The station is owned by the Public Power Corporation (PPC).

== Unit V ==
Unit V was added to the existing four units of the Agios Dimitrios plant to be connected to the 400 kV outdoor switchgear, to increase the supply energy to the Greek national transmission grid. It is a unit of 350 MW electric, plus 70 MW thermal for district heating purposes.

In 1993, PPC awarded the contract for the supply and installation of Unit V to the consortium of the companies Ansaldo GIE (consortium leader – Italy, at present (2008) Ansaldo Energia a Finmeccanica Company), Austrian Energy and Environment SGP/Waagner-Biro GmbH (Austria) and AEGEK (Greece).

Main steps of the contract execution were:

- cooling tower completion – November 1995

- 6 kV initial electrification – August 1996

- boiler first ignition – February 1997

- unit first synchronization – May 1997

- official opening – October 1997

- commercial operation – December 1997

In May 1995, a 6.6 Mw earthquake shook the area with a maximum Mercalli intensity of VIII (Severe), which affected the progress of the work. In the region, twenty-five people were injured, and damage was valued at $450 million.

=== Contract and project management ===
The contract was signed on March 31, 1993, by Th. Xanthopoulos, PPC general manager, Vincenzo Vadacca Ansaldo, GIE managing director, Heinz Zaunschirm and Helmuth Palzer, A.E. & E./Waagner-Biro directors and John Triadafillou, AEGEK managing director.

For the contract performance phase, the management of the project was provided by a project team composed by Roberto Pisani as project director, appointed by the consortium leader Ansaldo GIE, and Klaus Zink and Costas Latsenere as project managers, appointed by A.E. & E. and AEGEK respectively. At the plant, Salvatore Brozzas and Giorgio Simoncin were appointed by the consortium leader as site and start-up managers interfacing with S. Spaniolas, the Unit V construction manager of PPC. Project activities were supported by Vincenzo Gaiaschi, Konstantinos Metaxas and Konstantinos Keramidas in the consortium office of Athens led by Giorgio Mazzoni. Ansaldo GIE, consortium leader, played also the role of plant architect engineer, assigning to Roberto Masi this duty as project engineer.

On October 18, 1997, the unit was officially opened with the presence of Costas Simitis Prime Minister of Greece, Enrico Pietromarchi Italian ambassador in Greece, Fabrizio Pignatelli Italian consul at Thessaloniki, and with other representatives of the Greek parliament and local authorities.

=== Scope of supply ===
Object of the contract between PPC and the Consortium was the design, engineering, manufacture, supply, transportation, installation, testing, putting in operation and delivery of one lignite-fired steam electric unit of 350 Mwe plus 70 MWth in the Agios Dimitrios plant, including the design, engineering, construction and supervision of the civil works.

The project included the following main equipment, systems and works:

- One steam turbine generating unit with condensing system and feedwater heating system (Ansaldo GIE),
- One lignite-fired steam generating unit (boiler) (A.E. and E.),
- The main and auxiliary power transformers (Ansaldo GIE)
- Civil works (AEGEK)
- FD and ID fans (Ansaldo GIE)
- Electrostatic precipitators (A.E. and E.)
- Ash handling system (A.E. and E. / EWB Ltd.)
- Lignite handling system (A.E. and E.)
- Central heating air conditioning (AEGEK)
- Fire detection system (Ansaldo GIE)
- Waste water treatment (AEGEK)
- Demi water storage (AEGEK)
- Electrical equipment (Ansaldo GIE / A.E. and E.)
- I&C (Ansaldo GIE / A.E. and E.)
- District heating plant (Ansaldo GIE)

Greek companies as ASPATE S.A., Mekasol, Metka e Rodax participated in the construction of the unit as subcontractors of the three consortium members.

== Environment ==
=== Emission data ===
Greenhouse gas emissions as verified by the EU Emission Trading Scheme (in tCO_{2}e)
2008	2009	2010	2011	2012	2013	2014
11,803,191	12,919,320	14,292,671	14,228,640	14,732,181	13,105,386	11,810,688
Data: European Commission, 2015

== See also ==
- List of power stations in Greece
- Energy in Greece
