= Kozani =

City in Macedonia, Greece

Kozani Κοζάνη
- Municipality
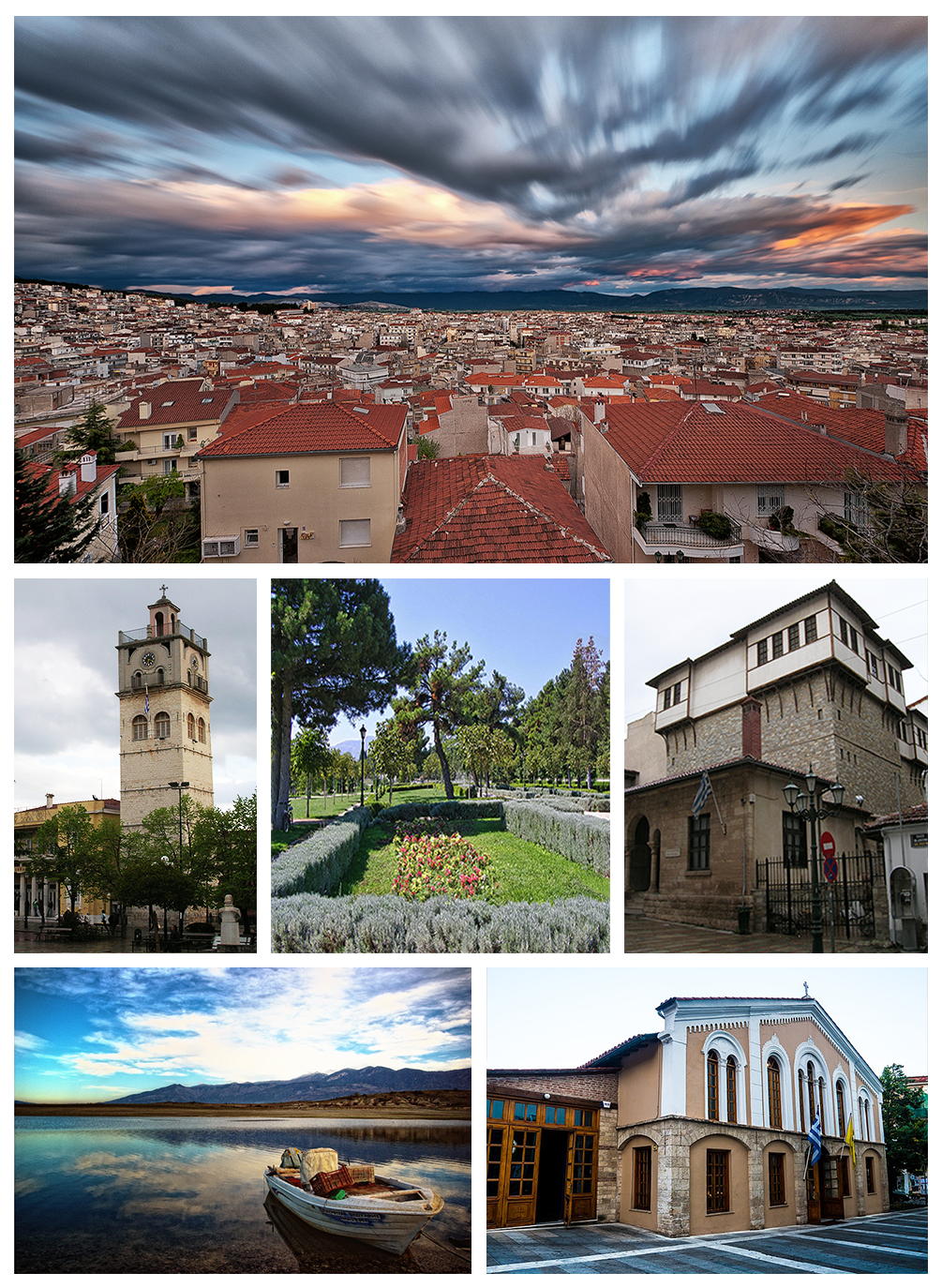
- Clockwise from top: Panoramic view of the city of Kozani, Municipal Garden of Kozani, Historical–Folklore and Natural History Museum of Kozani, Church of Saint Nicholas, View of the nearby Lake Polifytos, Nikis Square and its Clock Tower.

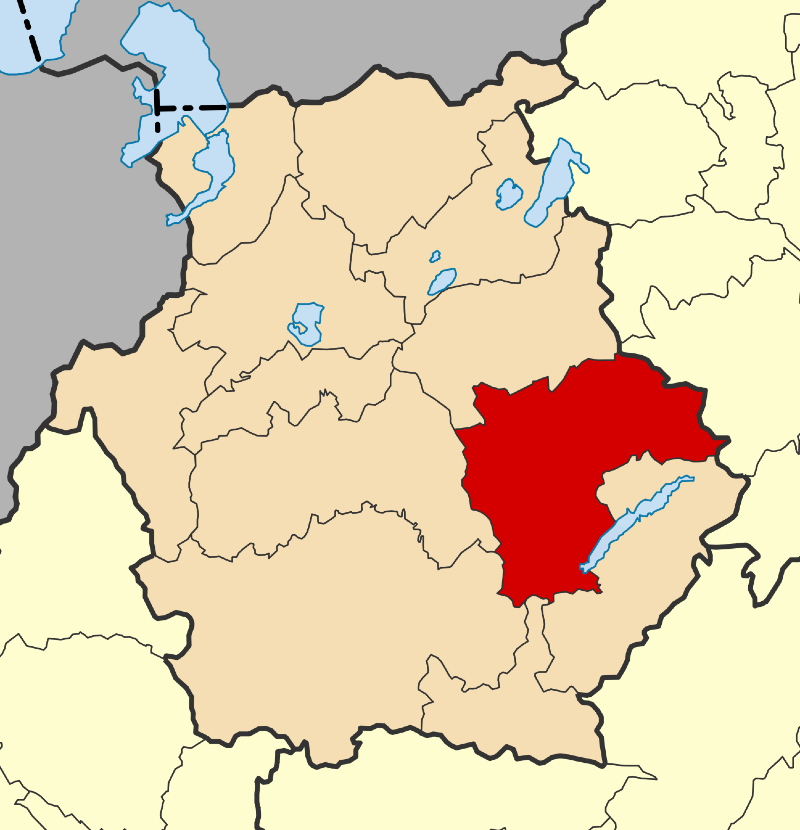

- Location within Greece
- Coordinates: 40°18′N 21°47′E
- Country: Greece
- Geographic region: Macedonia
- Administrative region: Western Macedonia
- Regional unit: Kozani
- Districts: 20

Government
  - Mayor: Ioannis Kokkaliaris (since 2023)

Area
  - Municipality: 1,071.3 km^{2} (413.6 sq mi)
  - Municipal unit: 366.0 km^{2} (141.3 sq mi)
  - Community: 34.371 km^{2} (13.271 sq mi)
- Elevation: 710 m (2,330 ft)

Population (2021)
  - Municipality: 67,224
  - Density: 62.750/km^{2} (162.52/sq mi)
  - Municipal unit: 53,174
  - Municipal unit density: 145.3/km^{2} (376.3/sq mi)
  - Community: 43,316
  - Community density: 1,260.2/km^{2} (3,264.0/sq mi)
- Time zone: UTC+2 (EET)
  - Summer (DST): UTC+3 (EEST)
- Postal code: 501 xx
- Area code: 2461
- Vehicle registration: KZ, MN
- Website: cityofkozani.gov.gr

Kozani (Greek: Κοζάνη, pronounced [koˈzani]) is a city in northern Greece, capital of the Kozani regional unit and of Western Macedonia. It is located in the western part of Macedonia, in the northern part of the Aliakmonas river valley. The city lies 710 metres (2,329 feet) above sea level, 15 kilometres (9 miles) northwest of the artificial lake Polyfytos, 120 km (75 miles) south-west of Thessaloniki, between the mountains Pieria, Vermio, Vourinos and Askio. The population of the Kozani municipality is over 67,000 people. The climate of the area is continental with cold and dry winters, and hot summers.

Kozani is the home of the University of Western Macedonia, with about 15,000 students from all over Greece and other places. It is also the seat of West Macedonia's court of appeal, police department, fire brigade, the seat of the 1st Army Corps of the Hellenic Army and of the Bishop of Servia and Kozani.

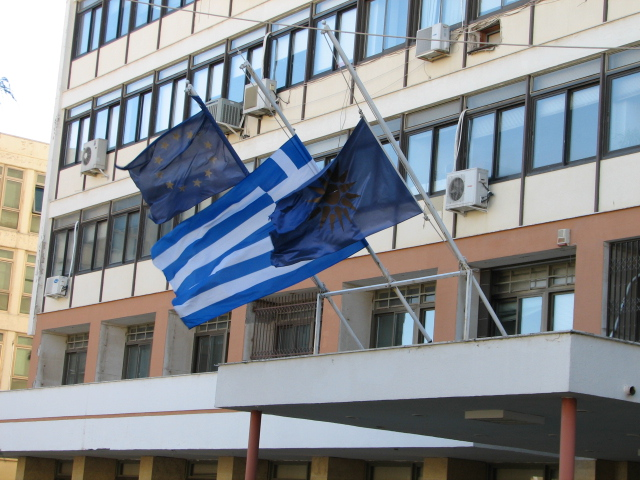
Prefecture building

One of the most important aspects of local folklore is Kozani's carnival at the end of the winter, which retains much of the profanity of the ancient Dionysiac cult. Kozani is renowned in Greece and abroad for the production of saffron (Krokos Kozanis), in the nearby town of Krokos.

Kozani is a transport node between Central Macedonia, Thessaly and Epirus. The nearest airport is Filippos Airport, 4 kilometres (2 miles) from the city, IATA code: KZI. The airport was first opened in the mid-20th century. Kozani is situated near the A2 motorway, which connects the coast of the Ionian Sea with Thessaloniki and Turkish borders.

== Etymology ==
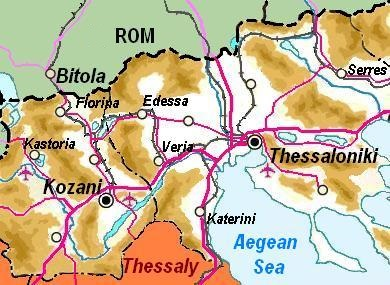
Kozani in Northern Greece

According to prevailing opinion in Greece, the name comes from the village of Epirus Kósdiani, the origin of settlers of Kozani in 1392. The settlement was first named Kózdiani, which then was changed into Kóziani, and in the end into Kozáni.

== History ==
=== Antiquity ===
Antiquities from the prehistoric to the Byzantine period have been unearthed in many sectors of the city. In the east part of Kozani, an ancient necropolis has been found, dating to the early Iron Age. During Philip II of Macedon's reign, the region was named Elimeia, which was part of Upper Macedonia and probably in the same place there was a town named Tyrissa (Greek: Τύρισσα). In the south-west of the modern city, on Siopoto hill, there was a settlement named Kalyvia, between 1100 and 1300, traces of which are still preserved.

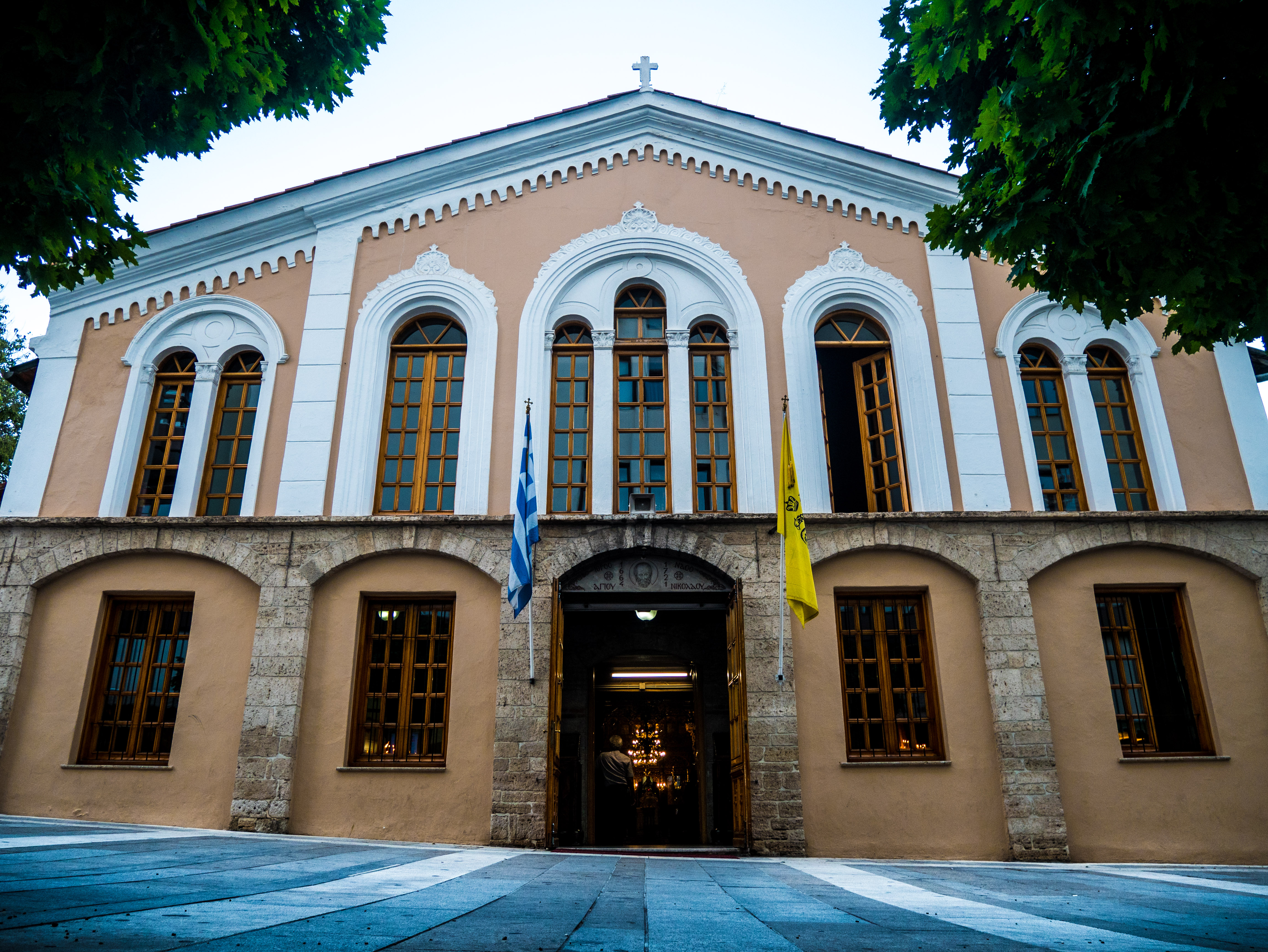
Saint Nicholas (Agios Nikolaos) church

=== Ottoman period ===
Kozani was probably founded by Christian settlers who, after the Ottoman conquest, withdrew from the plains of Macedonia into the mountains, during the 14th and 15th centuries. Its secure position soon attracted other Christians expelled from Epirus, in 1392. Together with the settlers from Epirus, many cattle-breeders moved in the region.

The first recorded mention of Kozani is in an Ottoman register of 1528, as a settlement with 91 houses, 23 singles and 15 widows. In the Ottoman tahrir defter (number 167) of 1530, the settlement is recorded as a village with the name Kozani, and was within the kaza of Serfice. One of the most important colonizers of Kozani was the chief shepherd Ioannis Trantas, who settled about 100 families. His son, Charisios Trantas, managed to obtain a Sultan's firman in 1664, according to the terms of which the town came under the protection of the Sultan's mother, was endowed with many privileges, and became forbidden for the Turks to settle in.

Agios Nikolaos' clock tower (Mamatsios), landmark of the city, in 1916.

In 1664, the magnificent church of Agios Nikolaos (St. Nicholas Cathedral) was built. In 1668, the library and the famous school of Kozani were founded. During the 17th and 18th century, commercial relations with the countries of central Europe gave the opportunity for the city to flourish economically. During the 19th century, as foreign travellers relate, the population of the town was Greek, and was growing.

The town's growth was disrupted in 1770, because of conflict that erupted between Kozani's local inhabitants and Kozanite merchants in central Europe, who contributed to the town's prosperity; even more catastrophically, the city was pillaged by Turkish beys in 1770. A subsequent incursion by Arslan Bey, in 1830, ravaged the city immensely. In 1855 next to St. Nicholas Church a 26 meters high bell tower was built, which would become the symbol of the city. In 1939, a clock was added to the top of the tower, donated by Greek-American, Konstantinos Mamatsios.

In the late 19th and early 20th century, Kozani was part of the Manastir Vilayet of the Ottoman Empire. In the 1881–1893 census, the kaza of Kozana had a total population of 27,652; consisting of 15,017 Muslims, 12,633 Greek Orthodox, and two Armenians. According to the 1904 population census of the Greek Kingdom's consulate, 12,000 Greeks and 350 Aromanians were living in Kozani at the time.

=== Balkan wars ===
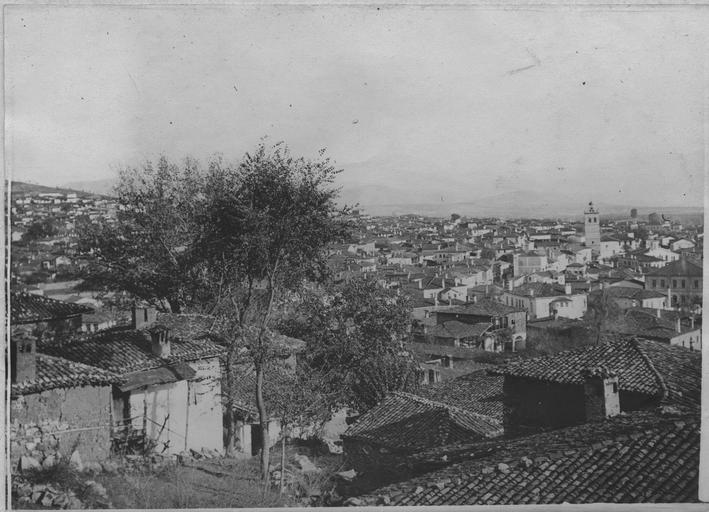
Kozani, 1918

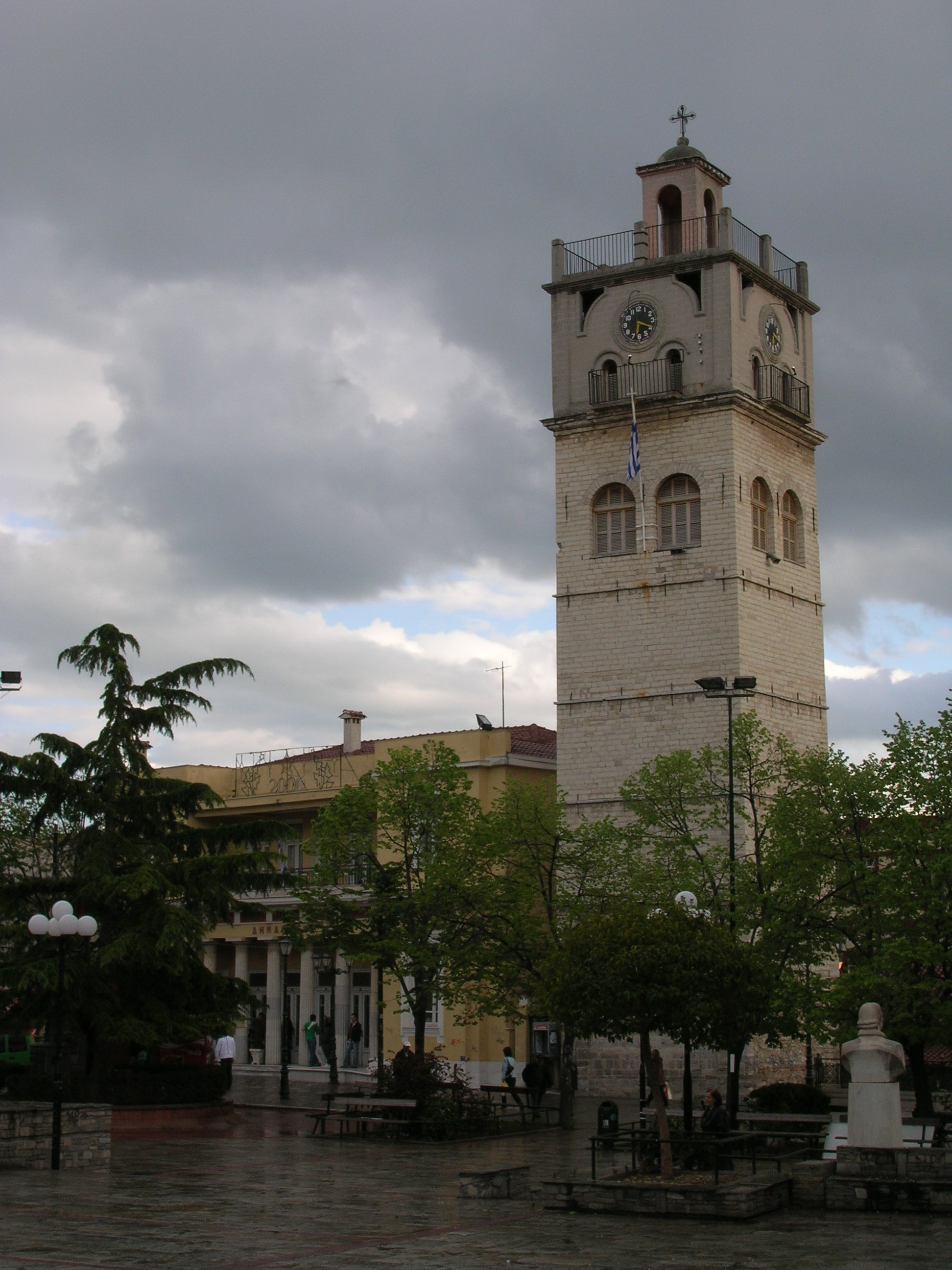
The clock tower today in Nikis Square

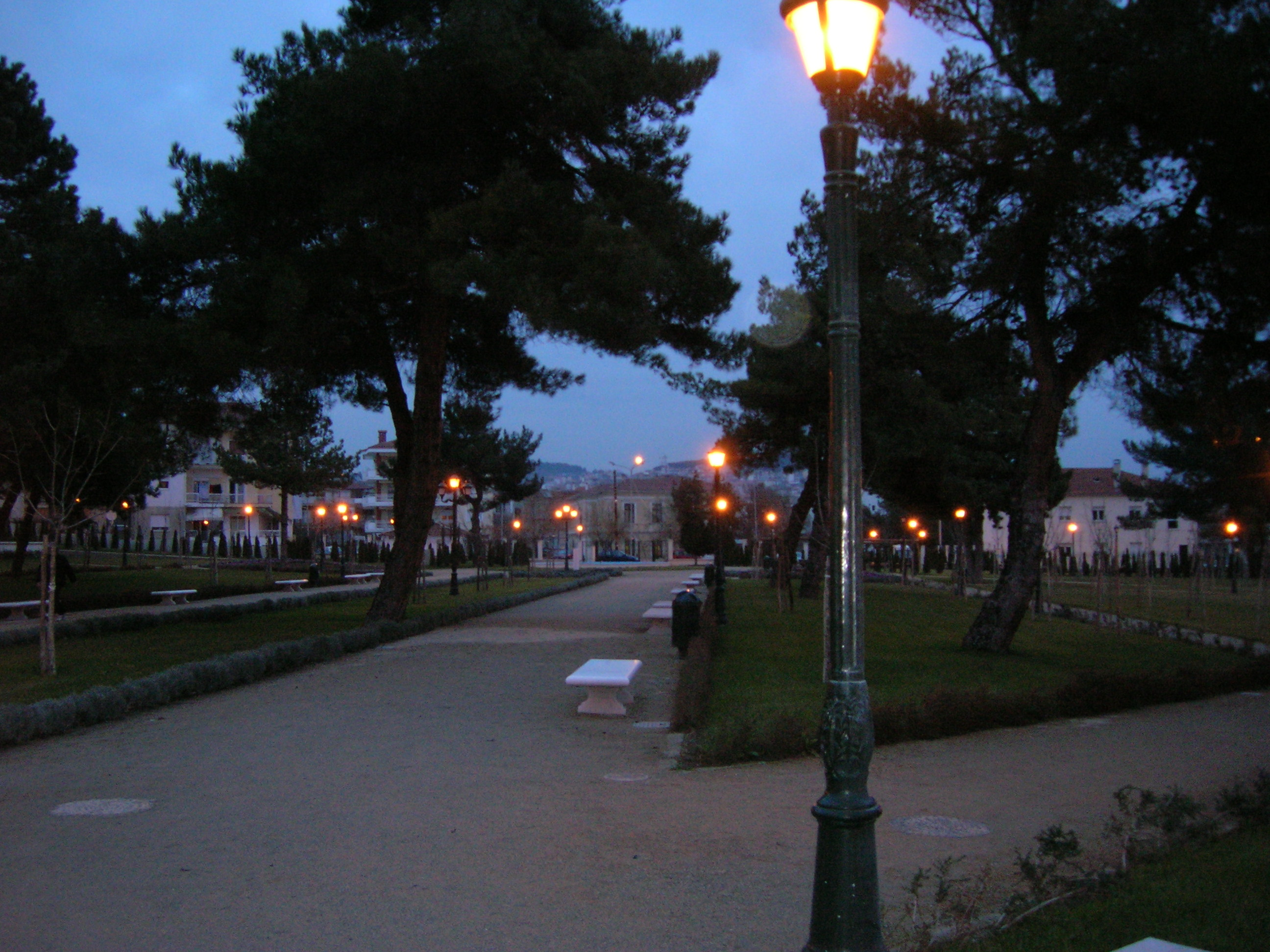
View of the municipal park

The Greek army entered Kozani on 11 October 1912, during the First Balkan War, after its victory against the Ottoman army in the Battle of Sarantaporo. By this time, the population of the town was 12,000 Orthodox Greeks. In 1923, during the population exchange between Greece and Turkey, about 1,400 Greek families from Pontus and Asia Minor were settled in Kozani.

=== Modern times ===
In the 20th century, the city grew tremendously, as lignite reserves in the area started being used by the Public Power Corporation, making Kozani the foremost producer of electrical power in Greece. An earthquake that occurred in the region on 13 May 1995, with a magnitude of 6.6 on the Richter scale, caused only property damage.

The city now combines modern with old architecture. Some magnificent buildings are the clock tower, the town hall, the folklore museum, the "Valtadoreio" Gymnasium, the National Bank of Greece building, the "Ermioneion" Hotel and the mansions of Georgios Lassanis and Grigorios Vourkas. The Municipal Library of Kozani called "Kovendareios" is the second biggest in Greece, and it has 150,000 books, rare publications, valuable documents, and one of the rare copies of Rigas Feraios' charter. For this reason Kozani was included in the National Cultural Network of Cities with object the promotion of the Book and Reading. The Institute of Book and Reading was established and Kozani is now known as City of Books. Kozani is the administrative, commercial, economic, and transport centre of the region of West Macedonia.

== Economy ==
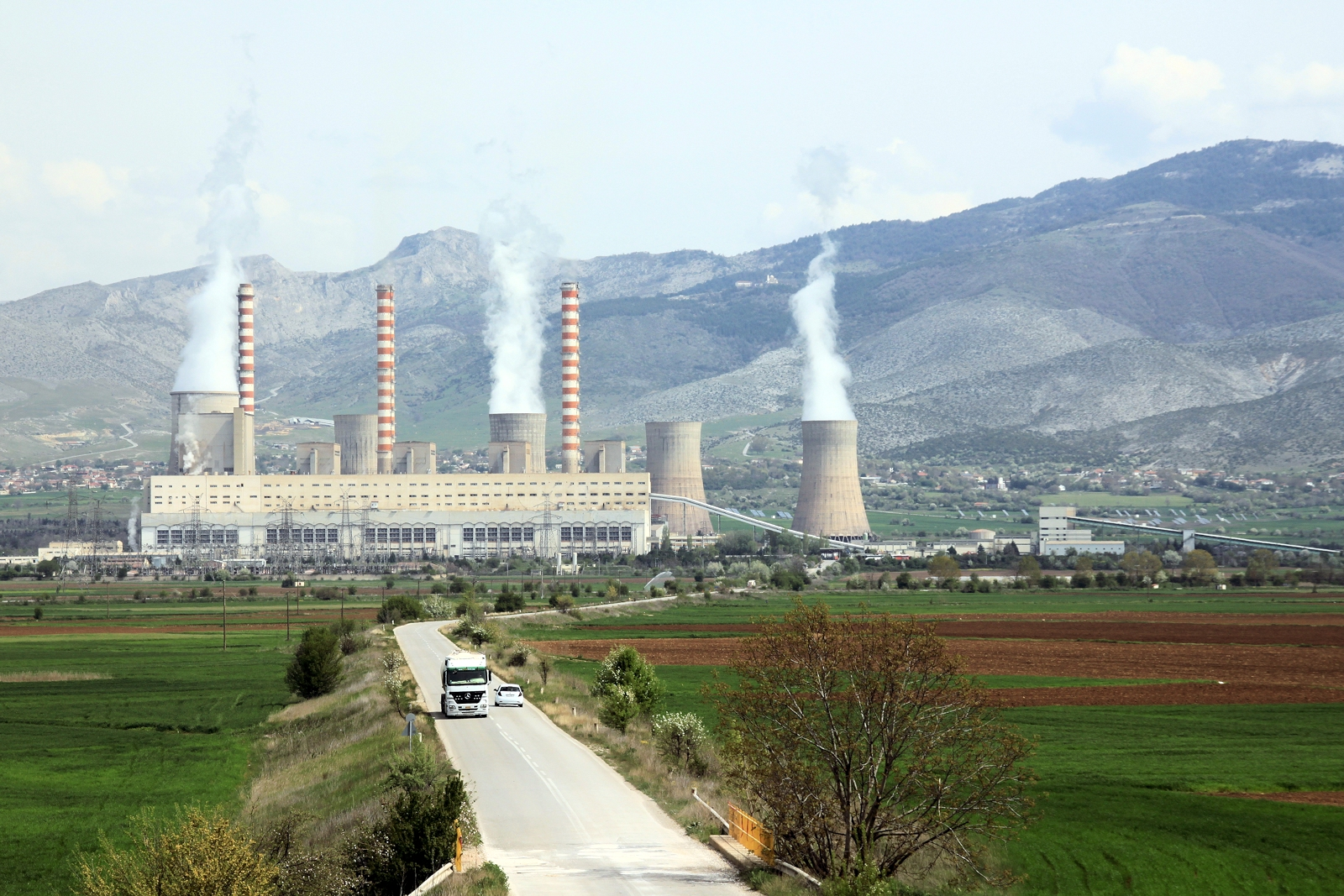
Agios Dimitrios Power Plant

The city is mostly known for its important contribution to the Greek electricity supply, and a large part of the population works in the Public Power Corporation's lignite-fired Agios Dimitrios Power Plant, the largest power plant in Greece. The Ptolemaida Basin hosts the Western Macedonia Lignite Center, which is accountable for the production of forty per cent of the electric energy of the country.

Other famous products are marble, saffron (Krokos, Kozanis), fruits, local wines and specialized arts and crafts industry. The Commercial Exhibition of Kozani takes part in the Exhibition Centre of Western Macedonia in Koila Kozanis every September. Many firms from Greece and other Balkan countries participate, especially with local products.

While Kozani remains a regional banking center, the Kozani-based Co-Operative Bank of Western Macedonia however failed the stress test conducted by the Bank of Greece and subsequently was liquidated in December 2013.

== Sites of interest ==
=== Downtown sites of interest ===
- The Archaeological Museum of Kozani
- The Historical–Folklore and Natural History Museum of Kozani is built according to old Macedonian architecture, and in its six floors, visitors can see everything about the geography, natural history, flora and animals of the region, as well as the history, the traditions and the past way of life in Kozani.
- The Museum of Modern Local History of Kozani
- The clock tower and the church of Agios Nikolaos - 350 years old - in Nikis Square.
- Other attractions include the Grigorios Vourkas Mansion and the Georgios Lassanis Mansion. The second one lies in a central square, named Lassani Square and it is used as the Municipal Map Library.

=== Nearby sites of interest ===
- The Municipal Park Kouri located in Agios Dimitrios where you can see the Cultural Center and the Municipal Theatre of Kozani, and the hill of Xenia with the nice view of all the city
- The Museum of the Macedonian Struggle in Chromio, a museum dedicated to the history of the Macedonian Struggle.
- Polyphytos bridge crossing the artificial Polyphytos lake. With a length of 1,372 m (4,501 ft), it is the second longest bridge in Greece after the Rio–Antirrio bridge.

== Media ==
There are some telecommunications companies, TV and radio stations, newspapers, magazines, and web portals based in Kozani.

=== Newspapers ===
The main newspapers of the region are Chronos, Proinos Logos, Tharros, and Grammi.

=== Television ===
Prominent television news channels in the region are West Channel, Flash TV, and TOP Channel.

=== Radio ===
Notable broadcast radio in the region include the following:

- ERT Kozani FM 100.2 and 100.6
- Siera FM 105.3
- Erotiko 99.5 FM
- Fresh Radio 92.9 FM
- Diva FM 91.6
- NRG FM 89.5

== Historical population ==
Year	Town	Municipal unit	Municipality
1971	23,240	-	-
1981	31,120	-	-
1991	31,553	43,395	-
2001	38,591	49,812	-
2011	42,604	53,880	71,388
2021	43,316	53,174	67,224

== Transport ==
The EO3, EO4 and EO20 national roads pass through the centre of Kozani: the A2 motorway (part of European route E90) and the Drepano–Petrana National Road bypasses the city to the outer north and east respectively, as well as the Koila–Drepano and Vatero–Koila national roads to the north and north west respectively. The southern end of A27 stops short of the city to the north, connecting with the A2 and the Koila–Drepano road: the Koila–Drepano road connects the A27 with the EO3 and the EO4.

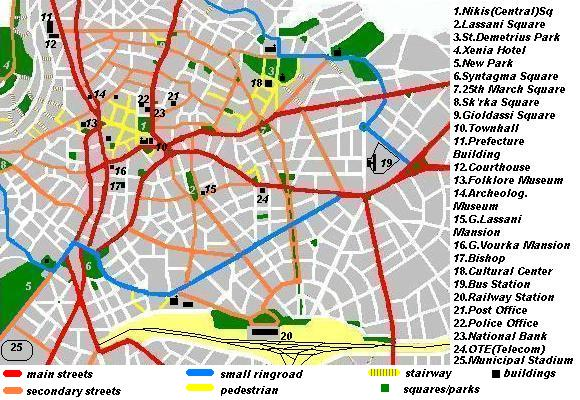
- Map of Kozani center, Greece.
  By bus, (KTEL Kozanis) for all West Macedonian towns and for the biggest Greek cities Athens (4 times/day - 470 km), Thessaloniki (every hour - 120 km), Larisa (120 km), Volos, Ioannina (160 km), Patras.
- By aeroplane (Sky Express), the city is connected with Athens and Kastoria from Filippos Airport which lies 3 km (2 mi) south-east of Kozani.

The public transit in the city is provided by minibuses, and between the centre and the municipal departments, it is provided by Transit buses. The traffic problems of the city have become more severe during the last few years. The Kozani–Amyntaio railway used to connect Kozani to the Greek railway network, but it was closed in 2010 and the line has since been severed by the Ptolemaida-Florina coal mine.

== Government ==
The municipality Kozani was formed at the 2011 local government reform by the merger of the following five former municipalities, that became municipal units:

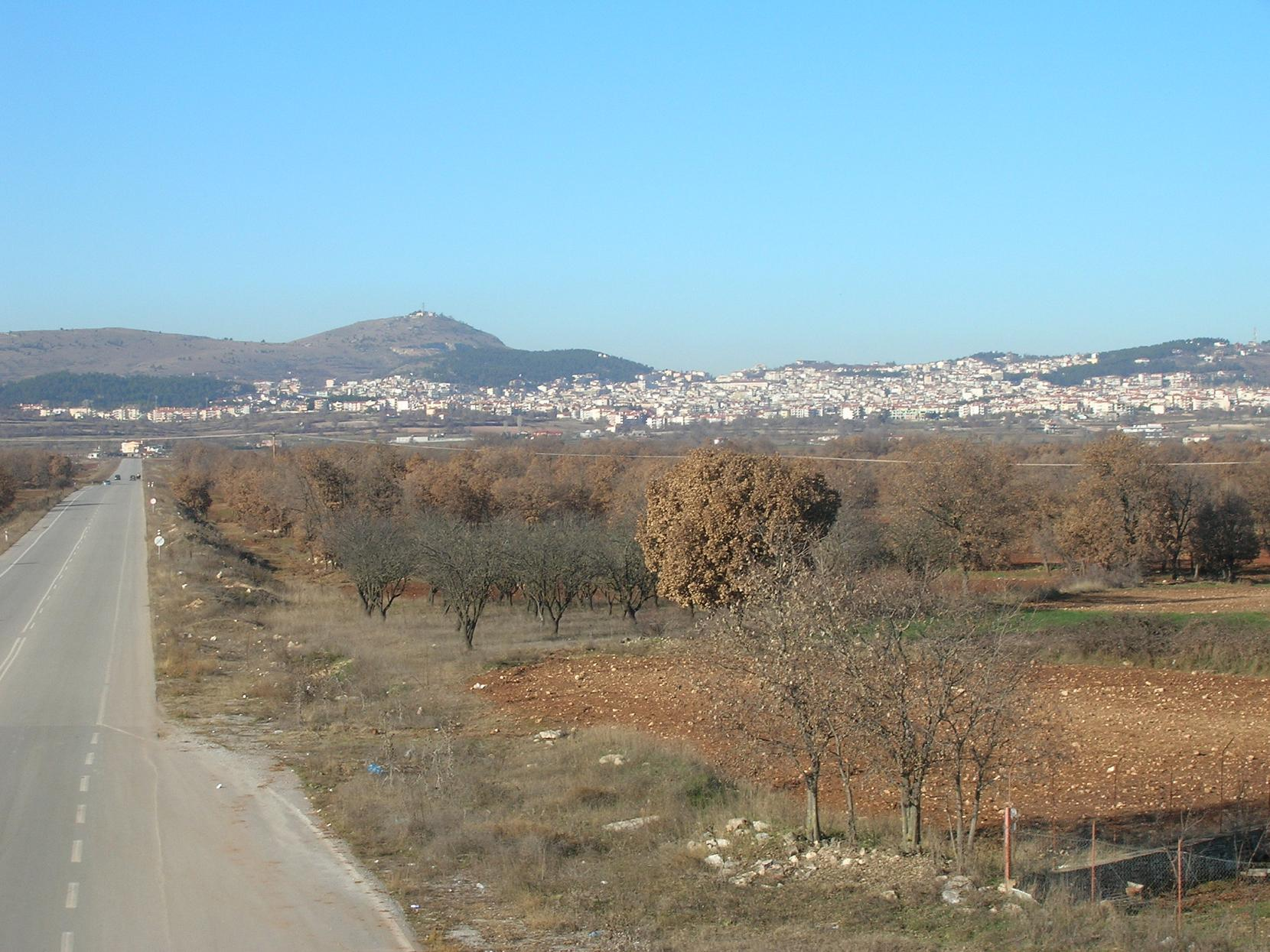
View of Kozani from the south. The Municipality of Kozani within West Macedonia after the 2011 reform.

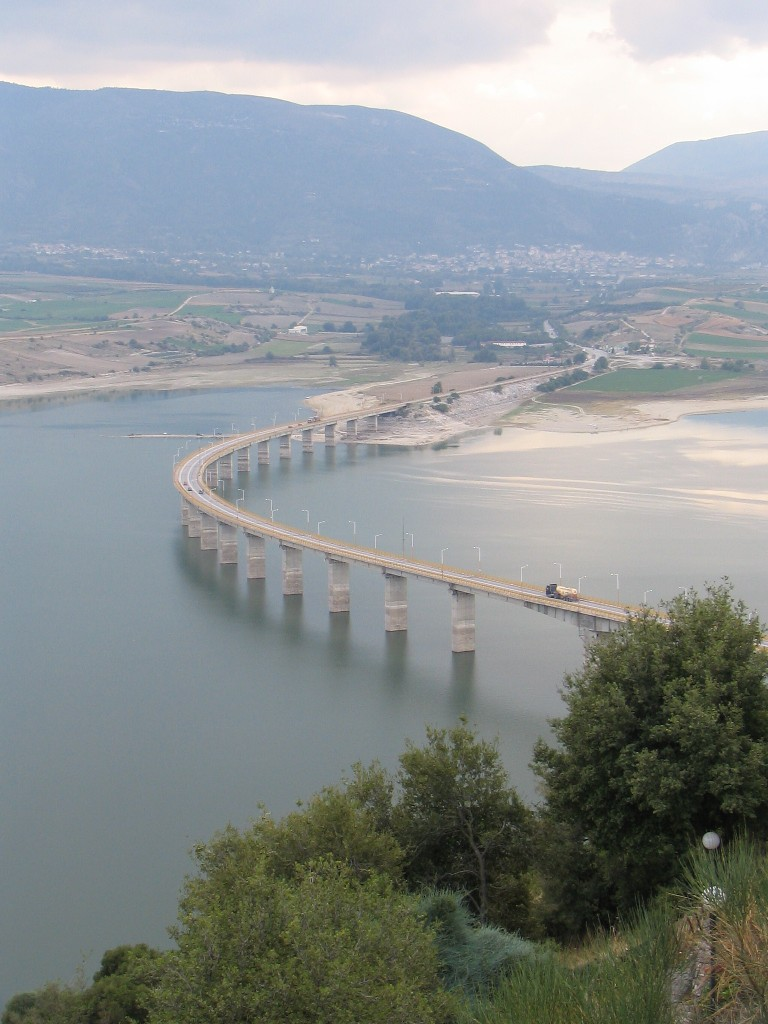
Polyphytos bridge crossing the Polyphytos artificial lake of the river Aliakmonas near Servia, Kozani.

Municipal unit	Population (2011)	Area (km^{2})
Kozani	47,461	366.018
Aiani	3,429	156.004
Dimitrios Ypsilantis	2,335	112.071
Elimeia	5,910	99.166
Ellispontos	5,834	337.992

The total population is 71,388 (2011). It is developing into a nodal town of the Western Balkans, with areas and activities of a wider regional nature. Within this context, the municipality of Kozani is creating a modern satellite town, the Kozani Zone of Alternate Urban Planning (ZEP). The Municipal Corporation of alternate planning and development of Kozani S.A.(DEPEPOK) was established in order to implement the projects of the ZEP.

The ZEP is strategically located on 50 ha south-west of Kozani, and aims to become a model development centre, attracting an urban population and economic activities from throughout Western Macedonia in Greece and the Western Balkans.

Other known neighborhoods of Kozani are Sk'rka, Ipirotika, Gitia, Agios Athanasios, Platania.

=== Province ===
The province of Kozani (Greek: Επαρχία Κοζάνης) was one of the provinces of the Kozani Prefecture. Its territory corresponded with that of the current municipalities Kozani (except a few villages that were part of the Eordaia province) and Servia-Velventos. It was abolished in 2006.

== Climate ==
Under the Köppen climate classification, Kozani has a humid subtropical climate (Cfa). Summers are warm to hot, while winters can be cold with several snowfalls, though few of them are heavy. Rainfall is spread quite evenly throughout the year. Since 1991, the highest temperature ever recorded is 41.2 °C (106.2 °F) on 25 July 2023 while the lowest temperature ever recorded is −15.0 °C (5.0 °F) on 8 January 2017.

Climate data for Kozani (1955–2010) normals
Month	Jan	Feb	Mar	Apr	May	Jun	Jul	Aug	Sep	Oct	Nov	Dec	Year
Mean daily maximum °C (°F)	6.2 (43.2)	8.2 (46.8)	11.8 (53.2)	16.5 (61.7)	21.9 (71.4)	26.8 (80.2)	29.6 (85.3)	29.6 (85.3)	24.9 (76.8)	18.8 (65.8)	12.5 (54.5)	7.5 (45.5)	17.9 (64.2)
Daily mean °C (°F)	2.3 (36.1)	3.8 (38.8)	7.2 (45.0)	11.8 (53.2)	17.1 (62.8)	21.8 (71.2)	24.5 (76.1)	24.0 (75.2)	19.3 (66.7)	13.7 (56.7)	8.1 (46.6)	3.8 (38.8)	13.1 (55.6)
Mean daily minimum °C (°F)	−1.2 (29.8)	−0.4 (31.3)	2.1 (35.8)	5.6 (42.1)	10.0 (50.0)	13.7 (56.7)	16.3 (61.3)	16.3 (61.3)	12.7 (54.9)	8.4 (47.1)	3.9 (39.0)	0.3 (32.5)	7.3 (45.1)
Average rainfall mm (inches)	34.7 (1.37)	31.1 (1.22)	36.4 (1.43)	42.3 (1.67)	54.7 (2.15)	36.6 (1.44)	33.4 (1.31)	27.8 (1.09)	34.1 (1.34)	49.7 (1.96)	56.1 (2.21)	53.4 (2.10)	490.3 (19.29)
Average rainy days	10.2	9.4	10.6	10.4	11.4	7.8	5.6	5.1	6.7	8.2	10.2	11.8	107.4
Average relative humidity (%)	75.5	70.9	66.8	63.2	62.4	54.9	49.6	50.7	58.2	67.9	75.4	77.2	64.4
Source: Hellenic National Meteorological Service

== Education ==
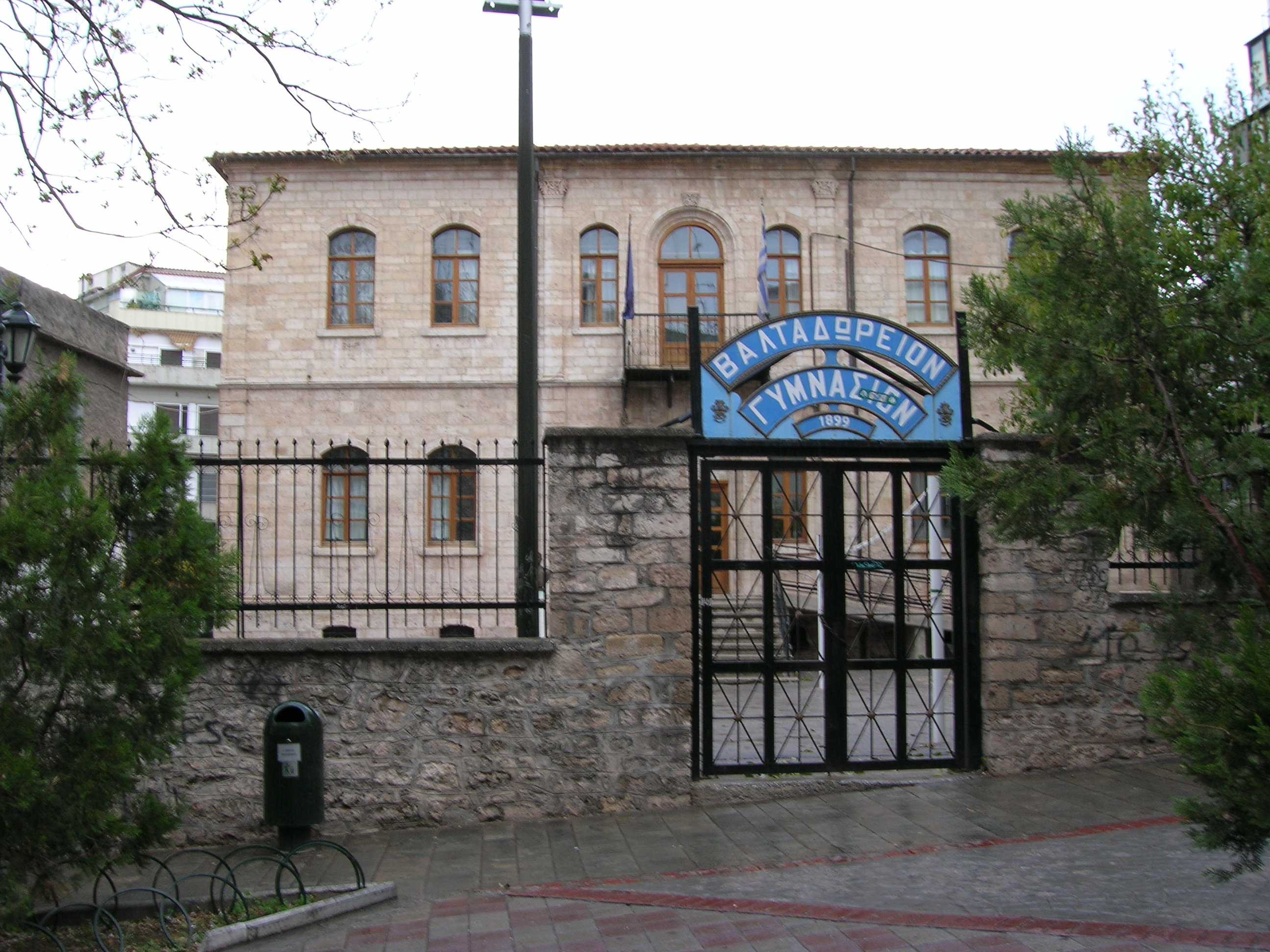
Valtadoreion Gymnasion

There are 18 Primary schools in Kozani, and another 8, in the municipal departments of Vatero, Kariditsa, Koila, Lefkovrysi, Lefkopigi, Nea Charavgi, Xirolimni and Petrana. The Gymnasiums of the city are 8, and there are two more in the municipal departments of Lefkopigi and Xirolimni. There are also 4 Lyceums, 4 Vocational Schools (EPAL), some Business Schools and one municipal Odeum.

The city is the seat of the University of Western Macedonia which has 7 Faculties and 22 Departments in 5 cities (Kozani, Florina, Kastoria, Ptolemaida, and Grevena). The main campus is located in the Active Urban Planning Zone of Kozani (ZEP), with a secondary campus in Kila, Kozani. The university was founded in 2002.

== Culture ==
=== Festivals and events ===
Kozani carnival is one of the most important events in the region, taking place at the end of winter. The dates change each year, depending on the start date of Lent. Carnival festivities in Kozani, and in general throughout Greece, last eleven days, starting on Τσικνοπέμπτη (Tsiknopempti lit. 'Charred Thursday'; equivalent to Fat Thursday, similar to Mardi Gras) and ending on Καθαρά Δευτέρα (Kathara Deftera lit. 'Clean Monday'; similar to Ash Wednesday).

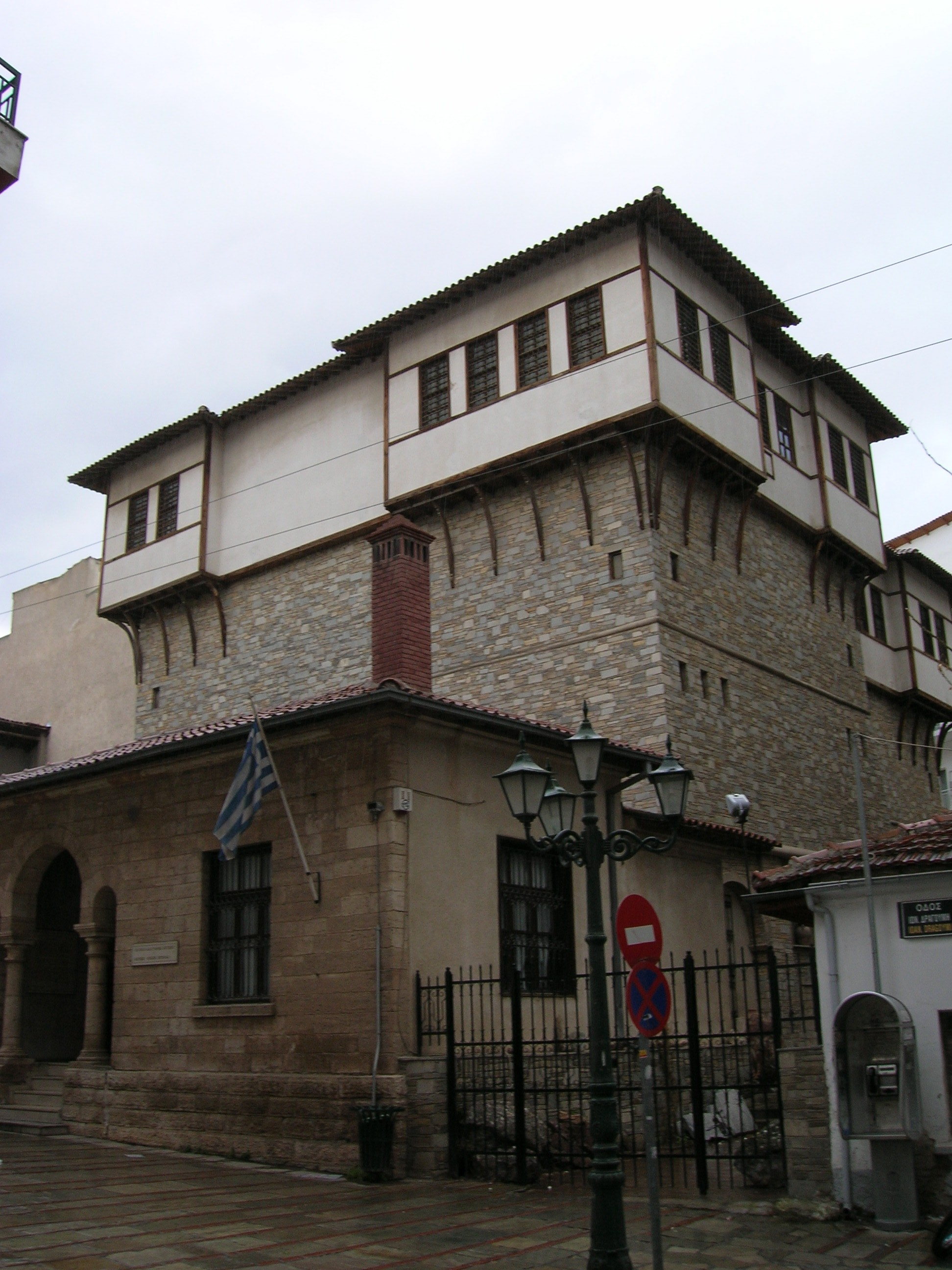
The Historical–Folklore and Natural History Museum of Kozani.

During the Kozani carnival, great bonfires are lit in different parts of the city; every night, another district lights its fire and people dance around it; on the last night of the carnival, all fires are lit. These festive fires, as well as the cultural associations that organize the festivities in each district, are called Fanoi (fires). Each fanos welcomes visitors and locals to their district with songs and dances, and treats them to local delicacies, namely kichia (feta cheese wrapped around a snail-shaped phyllo) and meatballs, as well as wine. Popular songs are sung around the fire, with the singers and crowd dancing in a primitive way that sees repeating the same steps and gestures; at midnight, scatological and explicit songs are sung. In between songs, bands play instrumental songs, such as the Enteka, often called Kozani's "national anthem". It is worth nothing that all of these festivities are executed in the city's dialect, Kozani Greek.

In 2010, Theodoros Lakkas, one of the most prominent figures of the fanoi, lead singer of the fanos Lakkos t' maggan and writer of funny short stories, published the first anthology of Kozani's carnival songs, entitled Ivgati Agoria m stou chouro [Go dance, my boys]. This has been the first attempt so far to collect all the songs in one volume.

At the end of summer the Lassaneia Events are organised. They consist of theatrical representations, concerts, athletic events etc. The name "Lassaneia" comes from Georgios Lassanis, who was from Kozani and participated in the Greek War of Independence. A part of those events is also the new authors' song festival "Nikolas Asimos".

Niaimeros is a fair in the north of the city in Niaimeros Place. It takes place on the first Tuesday of October. It used to last nine days (niaimeros, lit. 'nine days'), but now it lasts only 3 days.

Official local public holidays are the celebration for the liberation of the city from the Turks on 11 October and Saint Nicholas day - Kozani's patron - on 6 December.

The municipal Band is named Pandora. It was founded in 1902, and it takes part in all the events and celebrations.

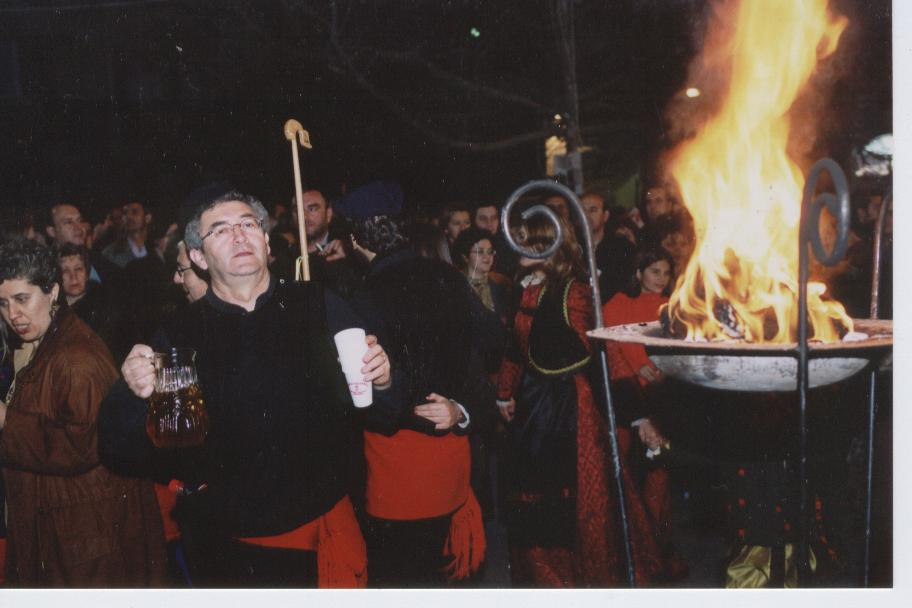
Fanos; an old carnival custom.

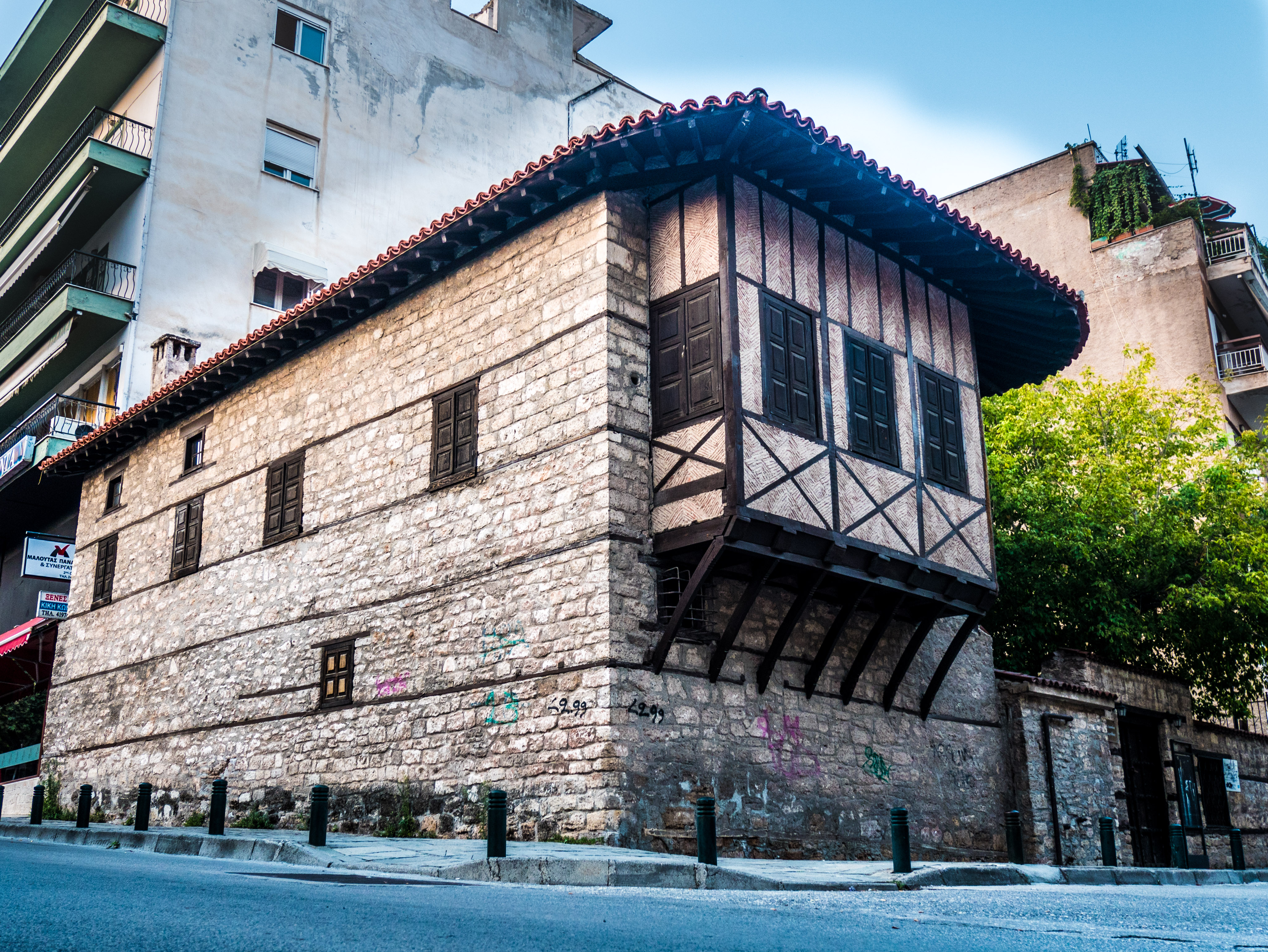
The mansion of Georgios Lassanis in Kozani. Today it is used as a Municipal Map Library.

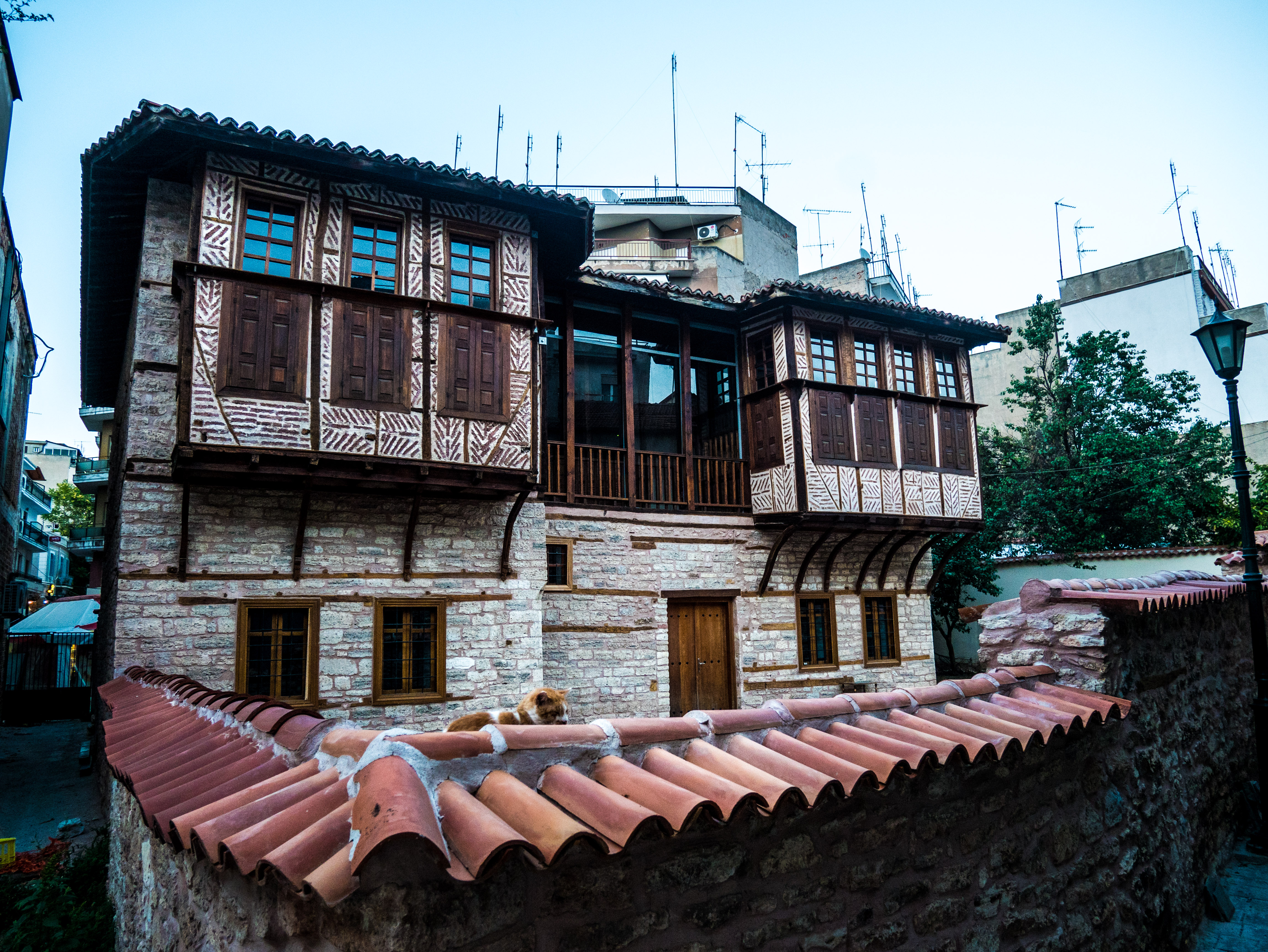
Vourkas mansion

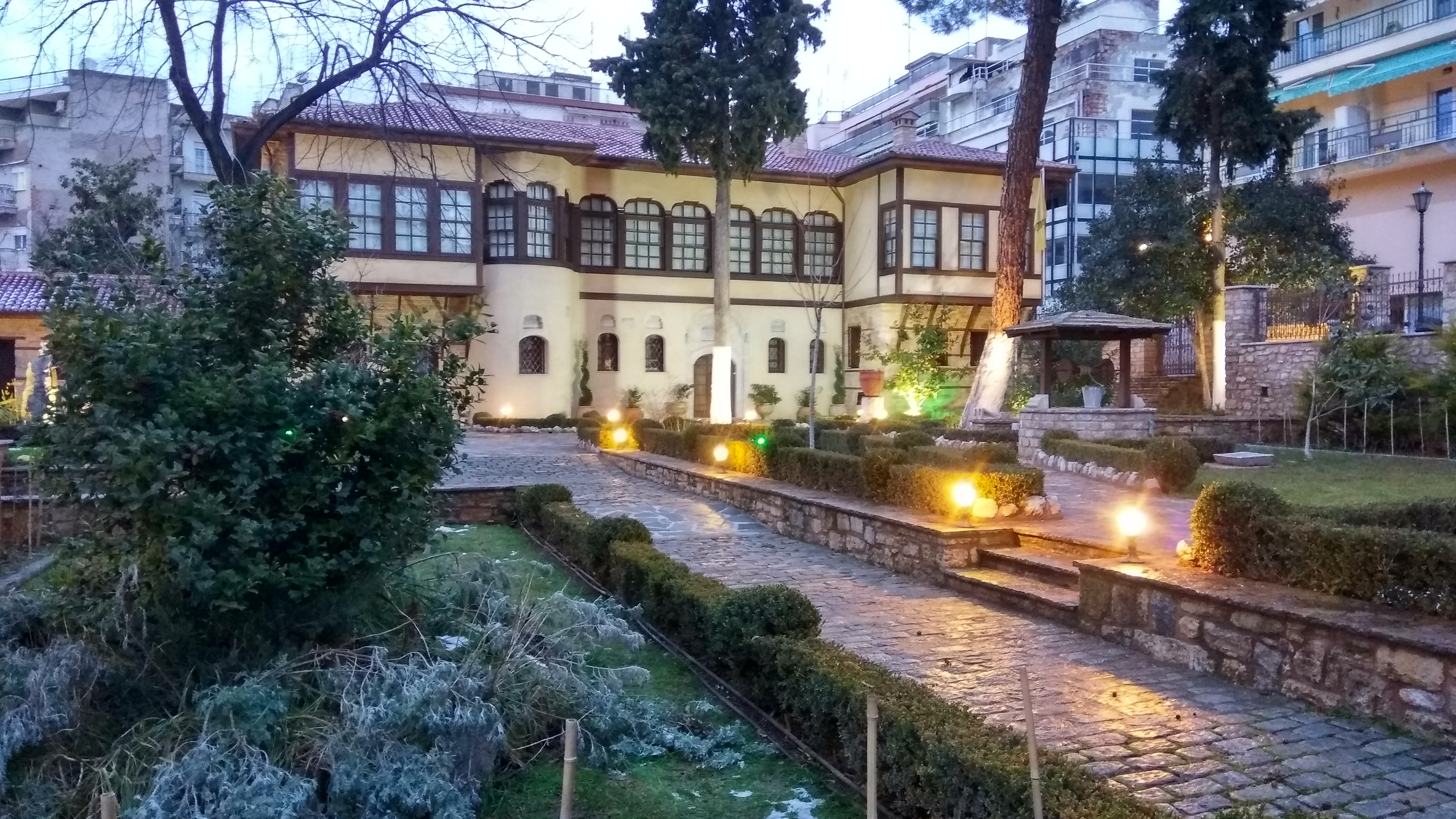
Metropolis (seat of the Greek Orthodox Metropolite (Metropolitan bishop)

=== Cuisine ===
A typical dish in Kozani is the so-called Yaprákia. The main ingredients are meat and rice in salty carbage-leaf, having the shape of an egg. It is used often as Christmas food. Kichí (Kozanitiko kichí) is another local dish, which is actually a cheese pie with circular-snail form.

=== Notable people ===
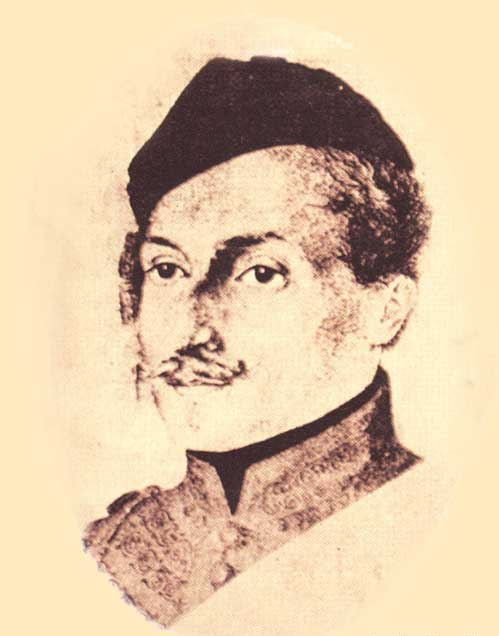
Georgios Lassanis

- Ioannis Amanatidis (b. 1981), footballer
- Nikolas Asimos (1949–1988), composer and singer of self-defined musical style "krok"
- Elias Atmatsidis (b. 1969), football goalkeeper
- Anna Diamantopoulou (b. 1959), civil engineer, politician, and former EU Commissioner, for Employment and Social Affairs, in the Prodi Commission
- Eleftherios Foulidis (1948), Orthodox Christian iconographer
- Georgios Lassanis (1793–1870), scholar and politician
- Giorgos Papakonstantinou (b. 1961), economist and former Minister for Finance of Greece
- Michalis Papakonstantinou (1919–2010), lawyer, author and former Minister for Foreign Affairs (1992–1993)
- Georgios Parakeimenos, educator
- Christos Rafalides (b. 1972), jazz vibraphonist, composer, and jazz-music educator
- Georgios Sakellarios (1765–1838), educator
- Ieroklis Stoltidis (b. 1975), footballer
- Apostolos Telikostoglou (b. 1995), taekwondo practitioner
- Chrisanthos Theodoridis (1934–2005), songwriter and singer of pontic music
- Ioannis Topalidis (b. 1962), former football player, assistant manager of the Greece national football team.
- Panos Tzavelas (1925–2009), member of Greek Resistance during WWII, and musician influenced by communist themes

=== Sports ===
- Kozani FC (Kozani FCA First Division)

== International relations ==
Kozani is twinned with:

- (United States) Bristol, Connecticut, USA, since November 2, 1987
- Iaşi, Romania
- Toluca, Mexico
- Targovishte, Bulgaria, since 2002

== See also ==
- Enteka dance
- I Army Corps of the Hellenic Army
- Gloubos (vehicles)
- Kozani National Airport "Filippos"
- Kozani Municipal Stadium
- Krokos Kozanis
- Metropolis of Servia and Kozani
