= List of mayors of Kozani =

Kozani, administratively, functions as a municipality, from 1879. Up to then, it was recognized as community. The current mayor is Ioannis Kokkaliaris, elected in 2023.

== The mayors of Kozani (1879–1912) – during the Ottoman domination ==
Nikolaos Chalkias (twice), Emmanouil M. Manos, Kotias Dardoufas, Nik. Rompapas (twice), Ioannis K. Govedaros (twice), Georgios Tsiminakis, Ioannis G. Govedaros, Georgios Handgiandreou (twice), Konstantinos A. Gagalis (twice), Stefanos G. Gortsoulis, Georgios Em. Manos, Nikolaos G. Armenoulis.

== The mayors of Kozani since 1912 ==
#	Name	Took office	Left office
1st	Nikolaos Armenoulis	1912	1913
2nd	Georgios Manos	1913	1915
3rd	Konstantinos Gagalis	1915	1916
4th	Georgios Manos	1916	1916
5th	Georgios Delivanis	1917	1919
6th	Ilias Vamvakas	1919	1920
7th	Georgios Delivanis	1920	1920
8th	Nikolaos Tsiminakis	1920	1920, 12 November
9th	Asterios Terpou	1920, 13 November	1922, 30 November
10th	Nikolaos Tsiminakis	1922, 1 December	1925, 3 September
11th	Ioannis Govedaros	1925, 4 September	1925, 30 December
12th	Asterios Terpou	1925, 1 December	1928, 24 February
13th	Argyrios Tsoumis	1928, 24 February	1929, 30 August
14th	Asterios Karagounis	1929, 1 September	1934
15th	Asterios Terpou	1934	1939
16th	Charisios Govedaros	1940	1945
17th	Ioannis Goras	1945	1945
18th	Christakis Konstantinou	1945	1945
19th	Dimitrios Terpou	1946	1950
20th	Argyrios Tsoumis	1951	1955
21st	Vasilios Matiakis	1955	1964
22nd	Merkouris Kyratsous	1964	1967
23rd	Nikolaos Chasapis	1967, 29 May	1967, 31 August
24th	Konstantinos Polyzoulis	1967, 1 September	1971, 7 November
25th	Nikolaos Athanasiadis	1971, 8 November	1972, 28 January
26th	Konstantinos Polyzoulis	1972, 29 January	1973, 25 May
27th	Dimitrios Delialis	1973, 26 May	1974, 24 September
28th	Georgios Foskolos	1974, 25 September	1975, 31 May
29th	Ioannis Papagiannis	1975, 1 June	1982, 31 December
30th	Ioannis Pagounis	1983, 1 January	1990, 31 December
31st	Paraskeuas (Paris) Koukoulopoulos	1991, 1 January	2009, 21 September
32nd	Lazaros Maloutas	2009, 22 September	2014, 31 August
33rd	Eleftherios Ioannidis	2014, 1 September	2019, 30 August
34th	Lazaros Maloutas	2019, 30 August	2023, October
34th	Ioannis Kokkaliaris	2023, October	incumbent
