= Agios Dimitrios, Kozani =

Village in Western Macedonia, Greece

Agios Dimitrios Άγιος Δημήτριος
- Community
- Location within Greece
- Coordinates: 40°24′53″N 21°55′37″E
- Country: Greece
- Administrative region: Western Macedonia
- Regional unit: Kozani
- Municipality: Kozani
- Municipal unit: Ellispontos

Population (2021)
  - Community: 621
- Time zone: UTC+2 (EET)
  - Summer (DST): UTC+3 (EEST)
- Postal code: 50150
- Area code: 2461

Agios Dimitrios is a village in the Ellispontos municipal unit, Kozani regional unit, Greece. It is situated at an elevation of 780 meters above sea level. Near the village, there is the largest thermal power station in Greece, as well as the new Saint John Vazelon Monastery built in 1997.
