= Gloubos (vehicles) =

Manufacturer of quadricycles

Gloubos e-bikes is a manufacturer of quadricycles powered by a combination of human, electric and solar powers. The company was founded by electrical engineer Dimitris Gkloumpos, and is based in the city of Kozani, in northern Greece.

A prototype with a passenger car configuration was introduced in 2021 and tested extensively, while the first production version was introduced in 2022. Both passenger and light utility vehicles are produced.

The company has received awards for its applications of electric power on mobility in 2023 and 2024.
