= Vourkas Mansion =

18th century building in Kozani, Western Macedonia, Greece

The Vourkas Mansion is a historical building in the town of Kozani, Western Macedonia, Greece. It was constructed in the 18th century, when it belonged to Grigorios Vourkas, and was declared a historic monument. This 18th-century building is one of Kozani's old town houses. It is a typical example of urban Macedonian architecture. The ceilings are coffered and the building has a courtyard. Inside are displayed marble architectural remains, and mosaics from Komanos and other parts of Kozani prefecture, together with portable icons and ecclesiastical books from Piryi and Aiani.

The mansion currently functions as a museum.

== Gallery ==
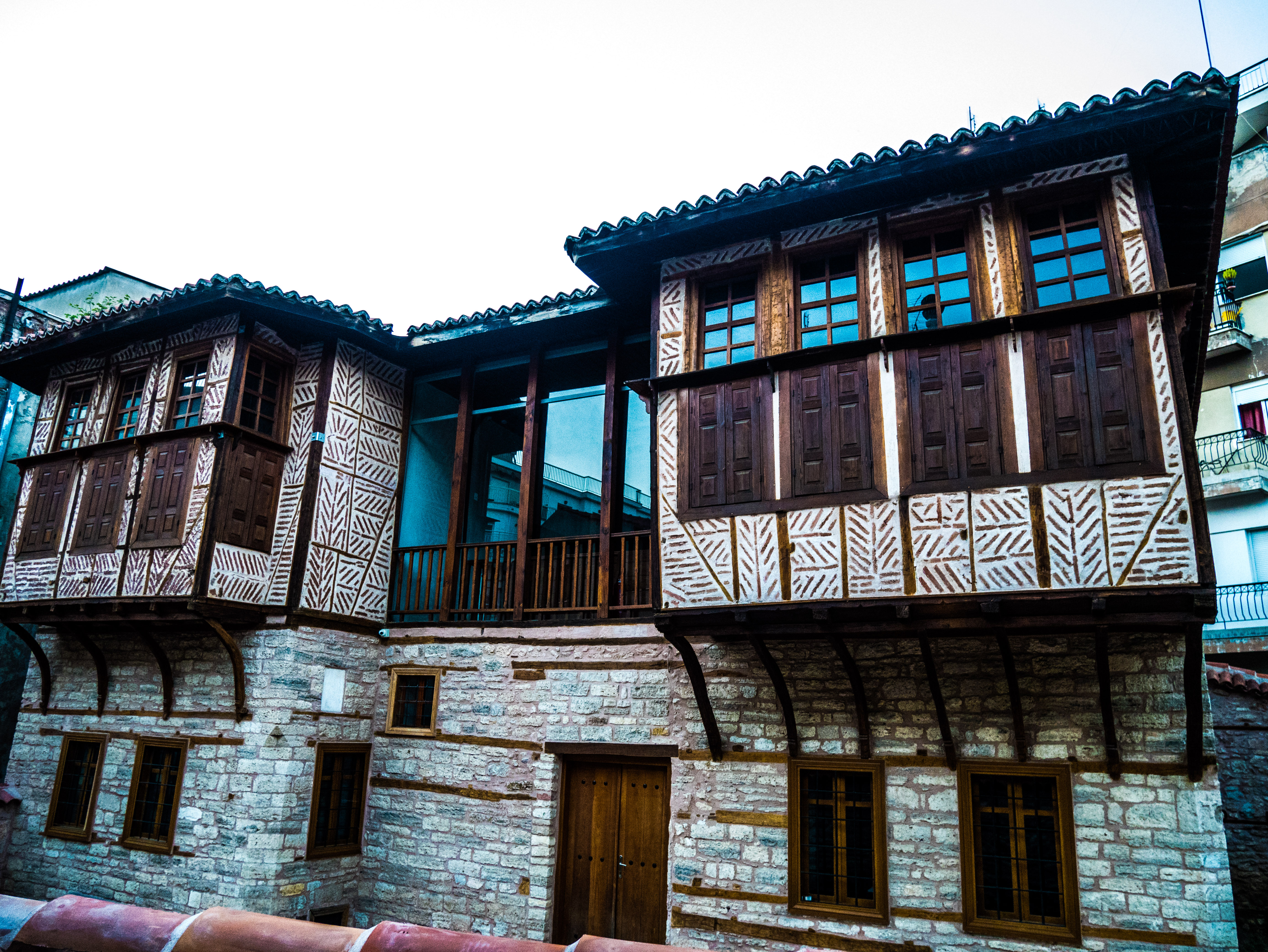
External view of Vourkas Mansion

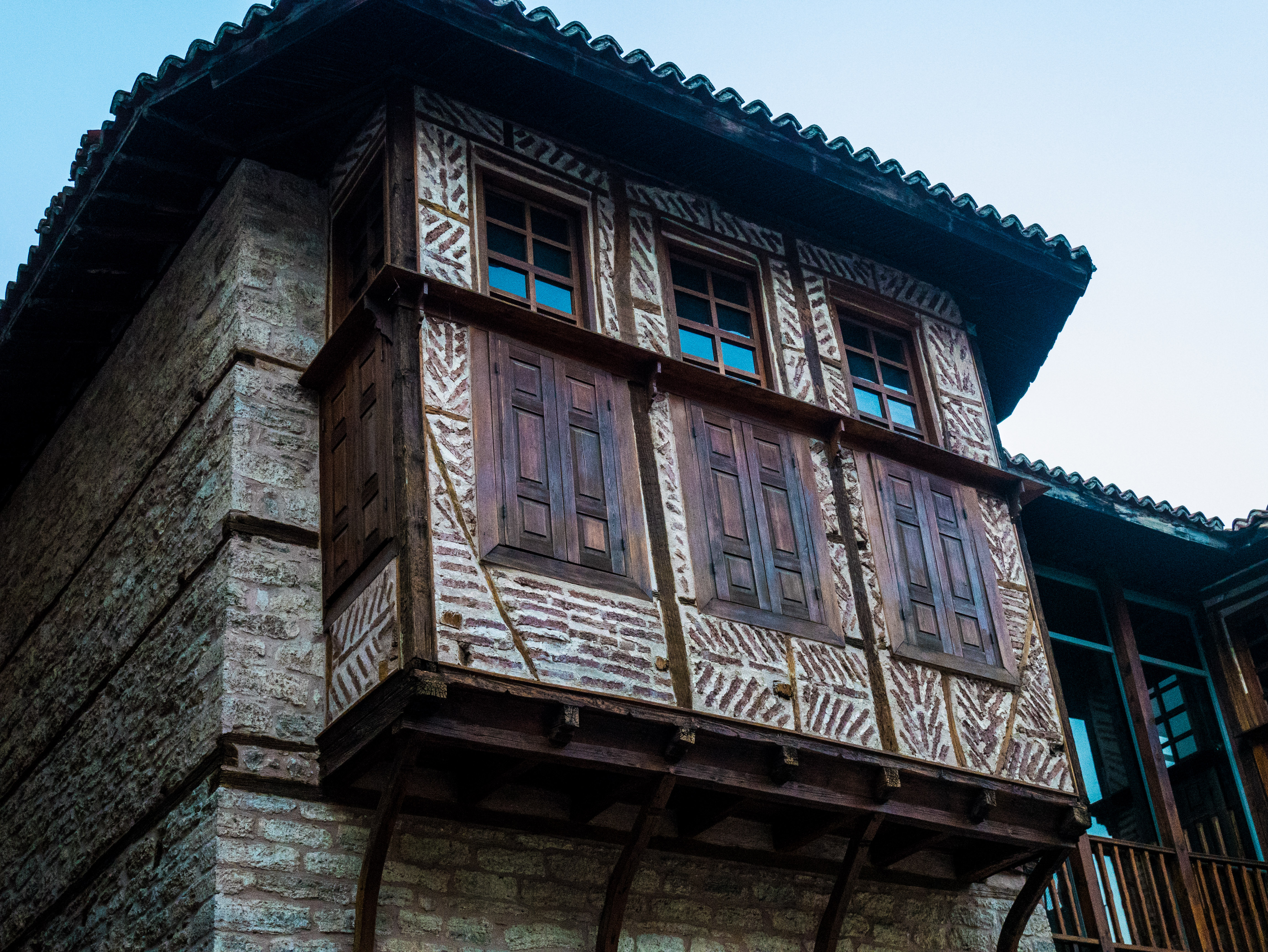
Close view

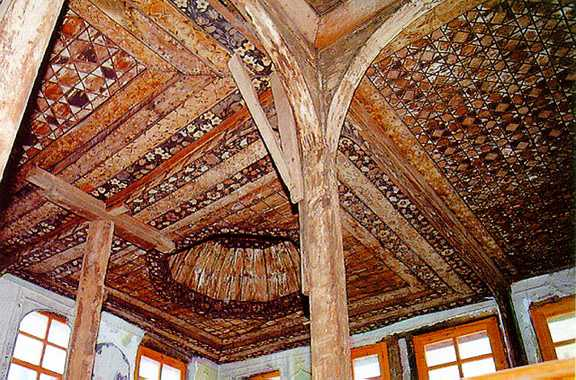
Wooden decorated ceilings

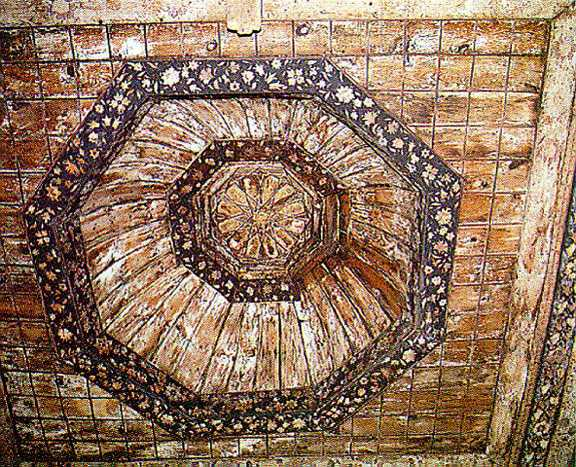
Built - in cupboards (mousantres)
