= Krokos =

Town in Western Macedonia, Greece

Krokos Κρόκος
- Community
- Location within Greece
- Coordinates: 40°16′N 21°49′E
- Country: Greece
- Administrative region: Western Macedonia
- Regional unit: Kozani
- Municipality: Kozani
- Municipal unit: Elimeia

Population (2021)
  - Community: 2,687
- Time zone: UTC+2 (EET)
  - Summer (DST): UTC+3 (EEST)

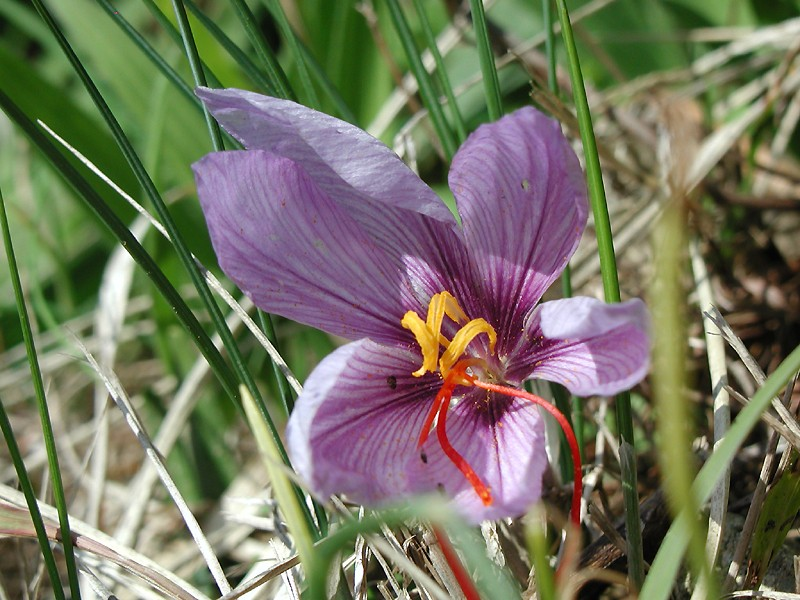
A saffron crocus flower.

Krokos (Greek: Κρόκος) is a small Greek town, 5 km south of the city of Kozani located in the geographical region of Western Macedonia, in Greece. It was the seat of the municipality of Elimeia and it is famous globally for the production of high-quality saffron. Its population was 2,687 at the 2021 census.

== Krokos Kozanis (saffron) ==
The town of Krokos is renowned in Greece and abroad for the production of saffron, which is one of the world's most intense and valuable varieties. Although the ancient Minoans were known to cultivate saffron during Late Bronze Age Crete, the cultivation of the plant disappeared from Greece until the 17th century, when Greek traders brought the plant from Austria to the region of Kozani. The town of Krokos is the base of the Cooperative of Saffron Producers of Kozani, a cooperative that counts 2000 members spread between 40 small villages. Annual production, depending on weather conditions, ranges from 6 to 12 tons of pure red saffron each year. Much of this production is certified organic. Saffron from the region is PDO protected due to its particularly high quality colour and strong flavor; no other region of Greece produces Red Saffron. Greek Red Saffron, as provided by the Kozani Cooperative, has a guaranteed coloring strength of 230.
