= Aegek SA =

AEGEK S.A. (http://www.aegek.gr), through its subsidiaries, engages in the development and construction of infrastructure projects in Greece.

It constructs projects covering various technical fields, such as dams, tunnels, hydroelectric and thermal power stations, large underground structures, irrigation works, building works, and works for the management of water resources. The company is also involved in the undertaking and construction of transportation works, including railway works and motorways; and electromechanical and public road projects. Furthermore, the company built a major part in Athens metro and currently builds the metro of Thessaloniki. Apart from domestic civil works, AEGEK made several contracts in other countries for civil and private constructions. AEGEK also got involved in self-financing projects such as Astakos Terminal (the first privatised port in Greece) and owns land throughout Greece worth several million Euros.

Following the Greek post-Olympic games crisis in which all major construction companies suffered losses, AEGEK is currently selling many of its properties in order to reduce the company's debt.

Companies that are associated or merged with AEGEK Group: Efklidis SA, Astakos Terminal SA, Meton SA, Edafostatiki SA, Polispark SA, AEGEF, AEGEK GRP ROM and others.

AEGEK was founded in 1949 and is headquartered in Amarousion, Greece. The company's shares are listed in the Athens Stock Exchange.
