= Georgios Sakellarios =

Georgios Sakellarios (Greek: Γεώργιος Σακελλάριος; 1765–1838) was a Greek scientist, medical doctor, philosopher, and revolutionary. He served as chief physician to high-ranking officials of the Ottoman Empire, including Ibrahim Pasha in Berat and Ali Pasha of Ioannina in Ioannina.

He was born in the Macedonian city of Kozani, then part of the Ottoman Empire, and studied medicine in Bucharest und Vienna. He was a student of, among others, Johann Peter Frank. In addition to his post at the court, he was an associate of Rigas Feraios (Greek: Ρήγας Φεραίος).

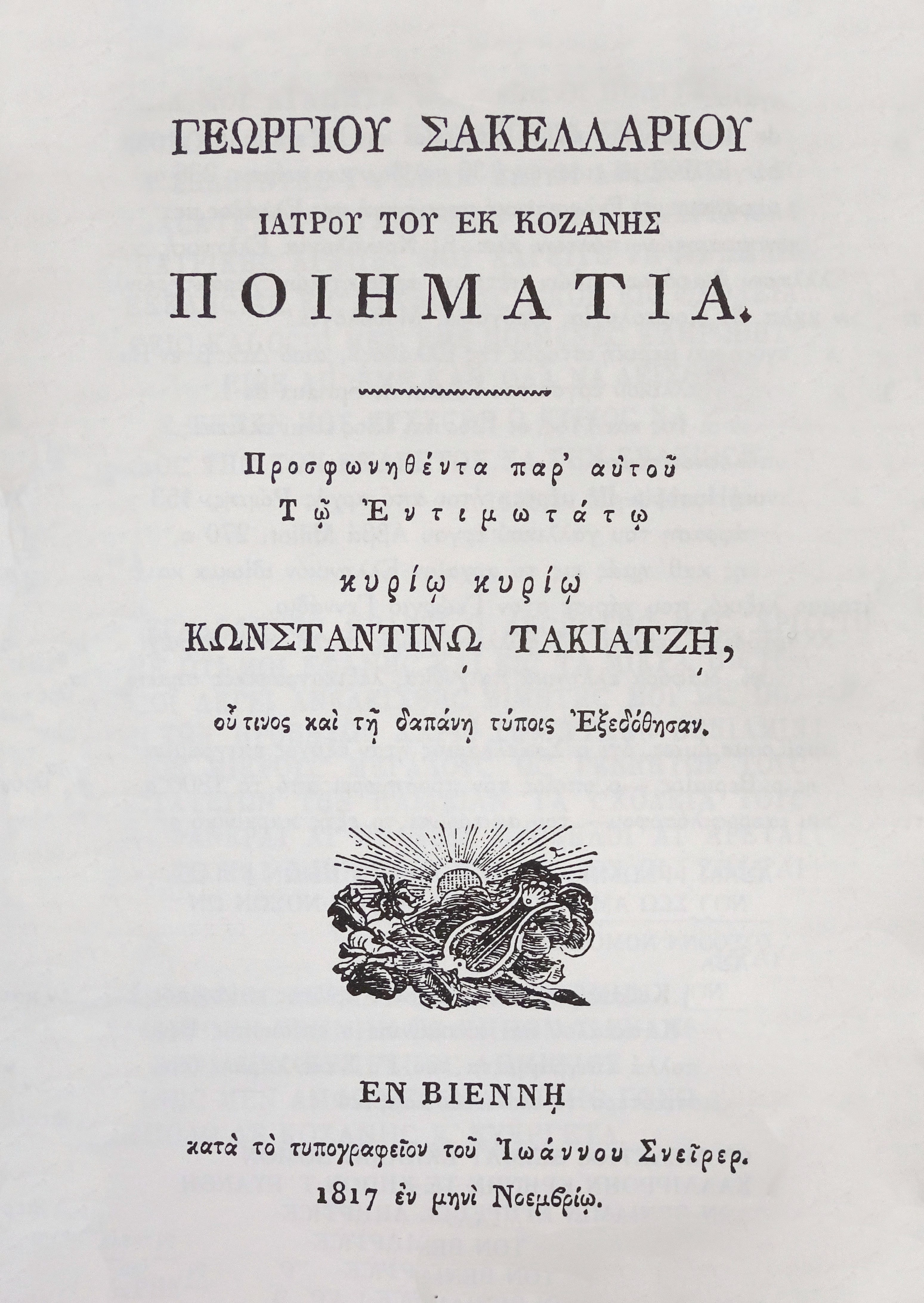
Title page of G. Sakellarios' "Poems", published in Vienna in 1817.

== Works (selected) ==
- Concise Archaeology of the Greeks: Containing the dogmatic, political and military orders, as well as their customs, and many other noteworthy things as shown in the table. (Greek: Αρχαιολογία συνοπτική. των Ελλήνων : Περιέχουσα τας δογματικάς, πολιτικάς και πολεμικάς τάξεις, άμα δε και τα ήθη αυτών, και άλλα πλείστα αξιόλογα ως εν τω πίνακι φαίνεται.). Vienna: Typogr. Georgios Ventotis (Τυπογρ. Γεωρ. Βεντώτη), 1796.
- A tour of Neos Anacharsis in Greece around the middle of the fourth century BC. Compiled in the French dialect by Lord Bartholomew and translated by George Constantine Sakellarios, from Kozani. (Greek: Περιήγησις του Νέου Άναχάρσιδος εις τήν Ελλάδα περί το μέσον τοῦ τετάρτου αιώνος προ Χριστοῦ. Συντεθεῖσα εν τῇ Γαλλική διαλέκτω παρά τοῦ Κυρίου Βαρθολομαίου και μεταφρασθεῖσα παρά Γεωργίου Κωνσταντίνου Σακελλαρίου, του εκ Κοζάνης.). Vienna: Philhelenes Press (Τύποις δέ εκδοθεῖσα Δαπάνη Φιλελλήνων), 1797.
- Poems by George Sakellarios, a doctor from Kozani / Addressed by him to the most honorable Mr. Konstantinos Takiatzis, at whose expense they were formally published. (Greek: Γεωργίου Σακελλαρίου ιατρού του εκ της Κοζάνης Ποιημάτια / Προσφωνηθέντα παρ'αυτού τω εντιμωτάτω κυρίω κυρίω Κωνσταντίνω Τακιατζή, ού τινος και τη δαπάνη τύποις εξεδόθησαν.). Vienna: Κατά το Τυπογραφείον του Ιωάννου Σνείρερ, 1817.
- (with Georgios Rousiadis) Homer's Iliad, Paraphrased and composed in verse with the addition of necessary and useful footnotes, and the publication of the Mythology, Allegory, and true History of all the Gods, Demigods, and Glorious Subjects included therein, for the Use of the Youth, and of those who are unable to comprehend the Homeric reed. (Greek: Ομήρου Ιλιάς Παραφρασθείσα και ομοιοκαταλήκτως στιχουργηθείσα μετά Προσθήκης αναγκαίων και επωφελών υποσημειώσεων, και αναρτήσεως της Μυθολογίας, Αλληγορίας, και αληθούς Ιστορίας πάντων των εν αυτή εμπιπτόντων Θεών, Ημιθέων, και Ενδόξων Υποκειμένων προς Χρήσιν της Νεολαίας, και των προς κατάληψιν του Ομηρικού καλάμου αδυνάτων.), Vienna: Hirschfeld Printing House (Εκ του Ελληνικού Τυπογραφείου δε Χίρσφελδ), 1817-1819.
- (with Rigas Feraios and Athanasios Christopoulos) Songs by various poets, the late Rigas, and other Liberal Greeks, which were added and printed from copies as if they were authenticated, at the expense of the printers. (Greek: Άσματα διαφόρων ποιητών, του τε αειμνήστου Ρήγα, και άλλων Φιλελευθέρων Ελλήνων' οις προσετέθηκαν και ευτράπελα εξ αντιγράφων ως οίόν τε εξηκριβωμένων, δαπάνη των τυπογράφων.). Nafplio: Typography of Konstantinos Tombras Kydonieos and Konstantinos Ioannidos Smyrnaios (εκ της Τυπογραφίας Κωνσταντίνου Τόμπρα Κυδωνιέως και Κωνσταντίνου Ιωαννίδου Σμυρναίου), 1835.

== See also ==
- List of Macedonians (Greek)
