= Georgios Lassanis =

Greek politician and scholar

- Γεώργιος Λασσάνης
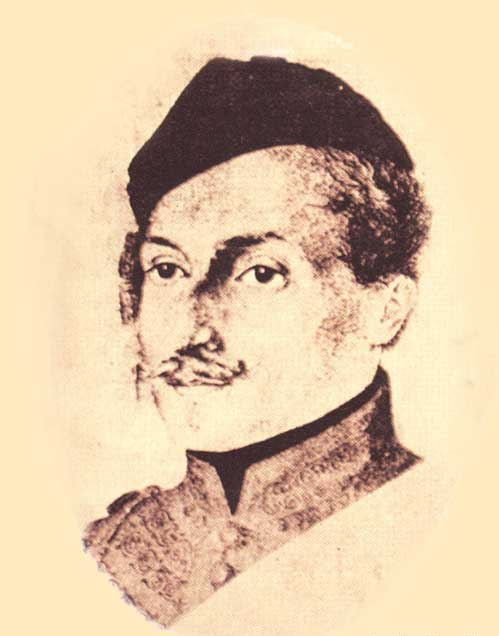
- An image of Georgios Lassanis

Minister of Finance
- In office 14 February 1836 – 21 March 1837
- Monarch: Otto
- Prime Minister: Josef Ludwig von Armansperg; Ignaz von Rudhart

Personal details
- Born: 1793 Kozani, Pashalik of Yanina, Ottoman Empire (now Greece)
- Died: 1870 (aged 76–77) Athens, Kingdom of Greece

Military service
- Allegiance: (Greece) First Hellenic Republic
- Branch/service: Hellenic Army
- Battles/wars: Greek War of Independence; Wallachian Uprising

Georgios Lassanis (Greek: Γεώργιος Λασσάνης; 1793–1870) was a scholar and politician from Kozani, Greece.

== Biography ==
He studied literature and philosophy in Leipzig, then, in 1818, moved to Odessa, where he taught at the Greek community's business school.

In Russia he became a member of Filiki Eteria, a secret Greek organisation.

In 1820, he abandoned teaching and Odessa, and became the adjutant of Alexander Ypsilantis. Lassanis and Ypsilantis were arrested by Austrian authorities and they were kept in close confinement for seven years in Terezín.

In 1827, they were released at the insistence of emperor Nicholas I of Russia. After the death of Ypsilantis, Lassanis returned to Greece. In Greece he took part in the Greek revolution with Dimitrios Ypsilantis. After the establishment of the first Greek state he became general inspector of the army of eastern Greece, and in 1837 he became finance minister.

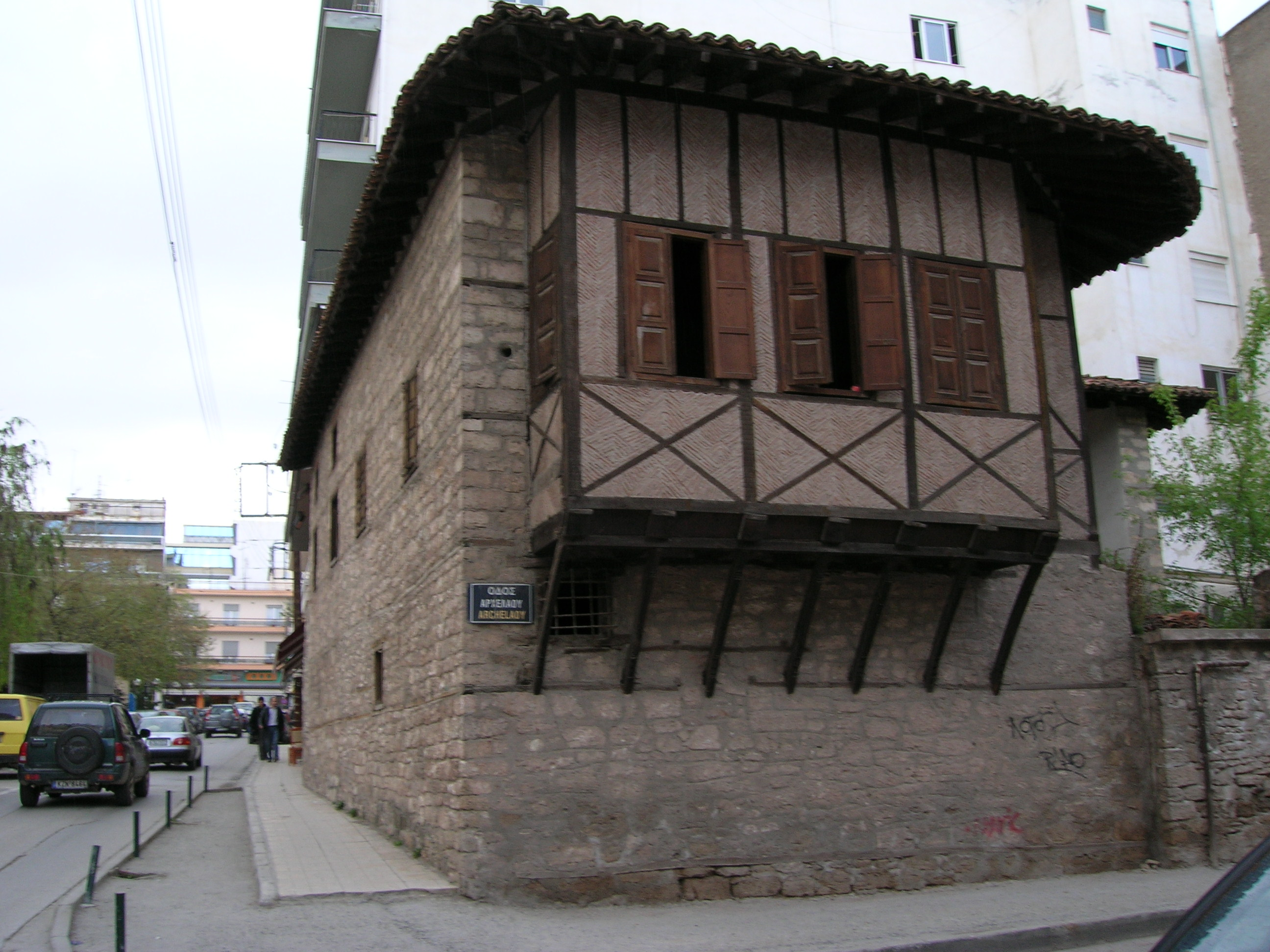
Lassanis mansion in Kozani

He died in 1870 at the age of 77.

Georgios Lassanis' mansion is preserved in a square of Kozani, which bears his name (Plateia Lassani), and it is used as the Municipal Map Library. In his honor, the municipality of Kozani holds a Lassaneia festival every August, with theatre, concerts, athletic events, etc.

== See also ==
- List of Macedonians (Greek)
