= West Channel (TV) =

- Country: Greece
- Broadcast area: Western Macedonia
- Headquarters: Kozani, Greece

Programming
- Language: Greek

History
- Launched: 1988

Availability

Terrestrial
- Digea: 40 UHF (Amyntaio, Florina, Kastoria, Ptolemaida, Vegoritida); 41 UHF (Grevena, Kozani, Servia); 44 UHF (Siatista)

West Channel is a Greek local channel which broadcasts from the city of Kozani for the periphery of Western Macedonia. It was created and launched in April 1991 by the lawyer Vicky Papafilippou and the businessman and benefactor Zissis Dardalis.

The two founders had a common dream: the creation of a channel of communication between the residents of Western Macedonia and those who live in Thessaloniki and Athens (the United States, Australia, Canada, Germany and elsewhere). West Channel has 17 transponders that cover all the places of the Region of Western Macedonia, up to the south-eastern regions of Albania and North Macedonia. The character of the program is informative, however, it falls short of the remaining factors that characterize a modern regional TV station.

== See also ==
- Television in Greece
