= Menelaus (son of Lagus) =

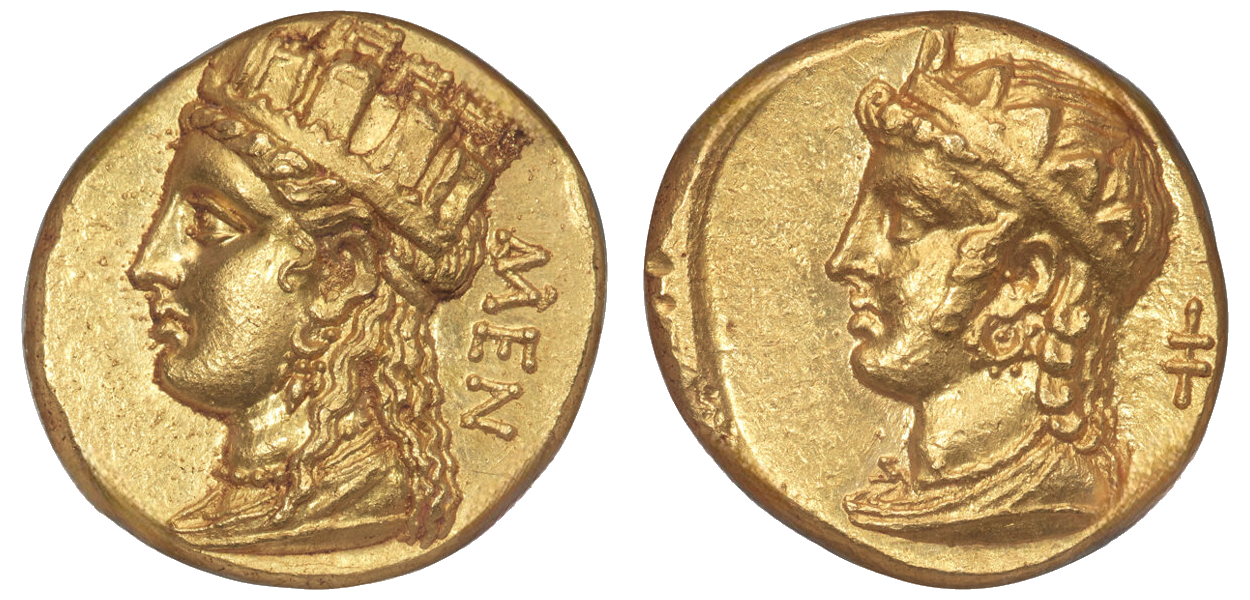
- Gold stater depicting Aphrodite with the inscription MEN (Menelaos) on the obverse and a draped bust of Aphrodite with the Cypriot Syllabic character "𐠞," representing "king," on the reverse; Salamis mint. Struck under Menelaos c. 310 BC.

King of Salamis
- Reign: c. 310 BCE – 306 BCE
- Predecessor: Nicocreon
- Born: c. 365 BC; Eordaea, Macedon, Greece
- Died: c. 285 BC; Alexandria, Ptolemaic Kingdom
- House: Lagidai
- Father: Lagus
- Mother: Arsinoe of Macedon (presumably)

Menelaus (/ˌmɛnɪˈleɪəs/; Ancient Greek: Μενέλαος, Menelaos), son of Lagus and brother of Ptolemy I Soter (ruler of Egypt), served as priest of the eponymous state cult of Alexander, and for a time was king in Cyprus, under his brother.

His name does not occur among the officers or generals of Alexander the Great (336–323 BC) during Alexander's lifetime, though it is incidentally mentioned by Phylarchus in terms that would seem to imply that he then already occupied a distinguished position. The earliest he appears in history is 315 BC, when he was appointed by his brother to the chief command of the forces dispatched to Cyprus, where they were destined to co-operate with the fleet of Seleucus, and with Nicocreon, king of Salamis. By their combined efforts, they soon subjugated all cities on Cyprus, with the exception of Kition; and that also, it would appear, must have ultimately submitted. Menelaus remained on the island, which he governed with almost absolute authority, the petty princes of the several cities being deposed, imprisoned, or assassinated at the slightest sign of disaffection.

He still held the chief command in 306 BC, when Demetrius Poliorcetes arrived on Cyprus with a powerful fleet and army. Unable to contend in the open field, Menelaus drew his forces together, and shut himself up within the walls of Salamis, which he prepared to defend to the utmost. But having risked an action under the walls of the town, he was defeated with much loss; and Demetrius pressed the siege with his wonted vigour. Menelaus, however, succeeded in burning his battering engines, and by the most strenuous exertions, defended himself until the arrival of Ptolemy, with a powerful fleet, to the relief of the island. In the great sea-fight that ensued, Menelaus sent a squadron of sixty ships to assist Ptolemy; but though these succeeded in forcing their way out of the harbour of Salamis, they came too late to turn the battle; and with the total defeat of the Egyptian fleet, he surrendered the city of Salamis, with all his forces, both military and naval, into the hands of Demetrius. Poliorcetes, sent him back to Egypt, accompanied by his friends, and carrying with him all his private property.

In the 280s, he served as the first eponymous priest of the cult of Alexander.
