= Eordaea =

Historical region of Macedonia

Coordinates: 40.5000°N 21.6667°E

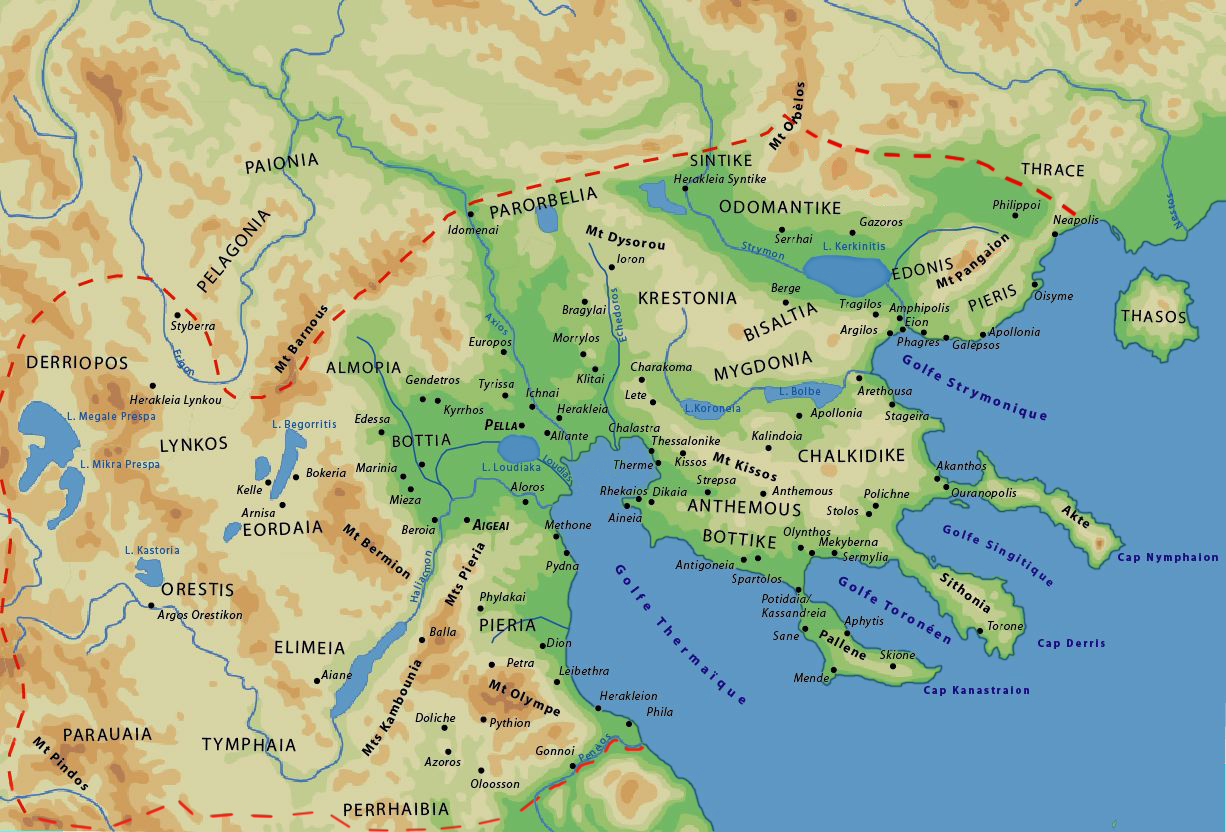
Map of the Kingdom of Macedon with Eordaea located in the western districts of the kingdom.

Eordaea (Ancient Greek: Ἐορδαία), also spelled Eordaia or Eordia, was a geographical region of Upper Macedonia and later an administrative region of the kingdom of Macedon. Eordaea was located south of Lynkestis, west of Emathia, north of Elimiotis, and east of Orestis. It was incorporated into the Argead kingdom of Macedon earlier than the rest of Upper Macedonia.

Eordaea stretched in the basin of Eordaia, the current homonymous municipality in Greece, which is named after the ancient region, and also in the southern part of the municipality of Amyntaio and the western part of the municipality of Edessa.

The capital of Eordaea was the city of Eordaea (el) (Greek: Εορδαία, κείμενη της λίμνης), which was mentioned by many historians and geographers of antiquity.

== Name ==
The name Eordaea is of proto-Greek origin and related to the Mycenaean word "Ϝορδία" meaning "rich land". The name refers to the fact that Eordaea was a region rich in roses, as noted by Herodotus (8.138).

== History ==
The history of Eordaea stretches long before 2000 BCE when the first Greeks, known as the Mycenean Greeks, began to inhabit this area. Remnants of exploited copper mines from 2700 up until 1200 BCE strongly indicate that the Greeks inhabited Eordaea for many years. Iron mines have also been exploited in the Eordean region.

== Recent discoveries ==
Within a 50-year period, paleontologists and archaeologists have made many discoveries due to the industrial development of the Eordean countryside. In particular, the skeletal fossils of a prehistoric mammoth, a prehistoric elephant, and Stone Age tools have all been found within the province of Eordaea. These finds add to knowledge on the variety of animal species and human artifacts from the region of Western Macedonia. In addition, two ancient Macedonian tombs have been excavated within Eordaia. The first was located in a rural area of the village of Spilia, while the second was located in the village of Pyrgoi.

== Towns ==
Many ancient towns of Eordaea are mentioned and many archaeological sites have been examined on the past decades, certainly around the Vegoritida lake, but it is difficult to distinguish their names.

The most significant towns, according to Ancient Greek, Roman and Byzantine Greek writers, were:

- Eordaea (city) (Greek: Ἐορδαία)
- Arnissa (Greek: Άρνισσα)
- Vegora (el) (Greek: Βεγόρα)
- Kella (Greek: Κέλλα)

== Notable people ==
- Ptolemy I Soter. He is the most known notable person of ancient Eordaea. He was a distinguished General of Alexander the Great. After the death of Alexander the Great, Ptolemy became Pharaoh of Egypt and founder of the Ptolemaic dynasty which ruled Egypt until 30BC.
- Lagus. Father of Ptolemy I Soter
- Peithon. Satrap of Alexander the Great
- Aristonous. Bodyguard of Alexander the Great
