= Balakros (disambiguation) =

Balakros (Ancient Greek: Bάλακρoς) or Balacrus was the name of several people from ancient history, generally associated with Alexander the Great:

- Balakros, fl. 4th century BCE, bodyguard of Alexander
- Balakros (son of Amyntas), fl. 4th century BCE, commander in the army of Alexander
- Balakros, fl. 4th century BCE, another commander in the army of Alexander, who led his javelin-throwers (ἀδκοντισαί)
