= Pyrgoi =

Pyrgoi Πύργοι
- Community
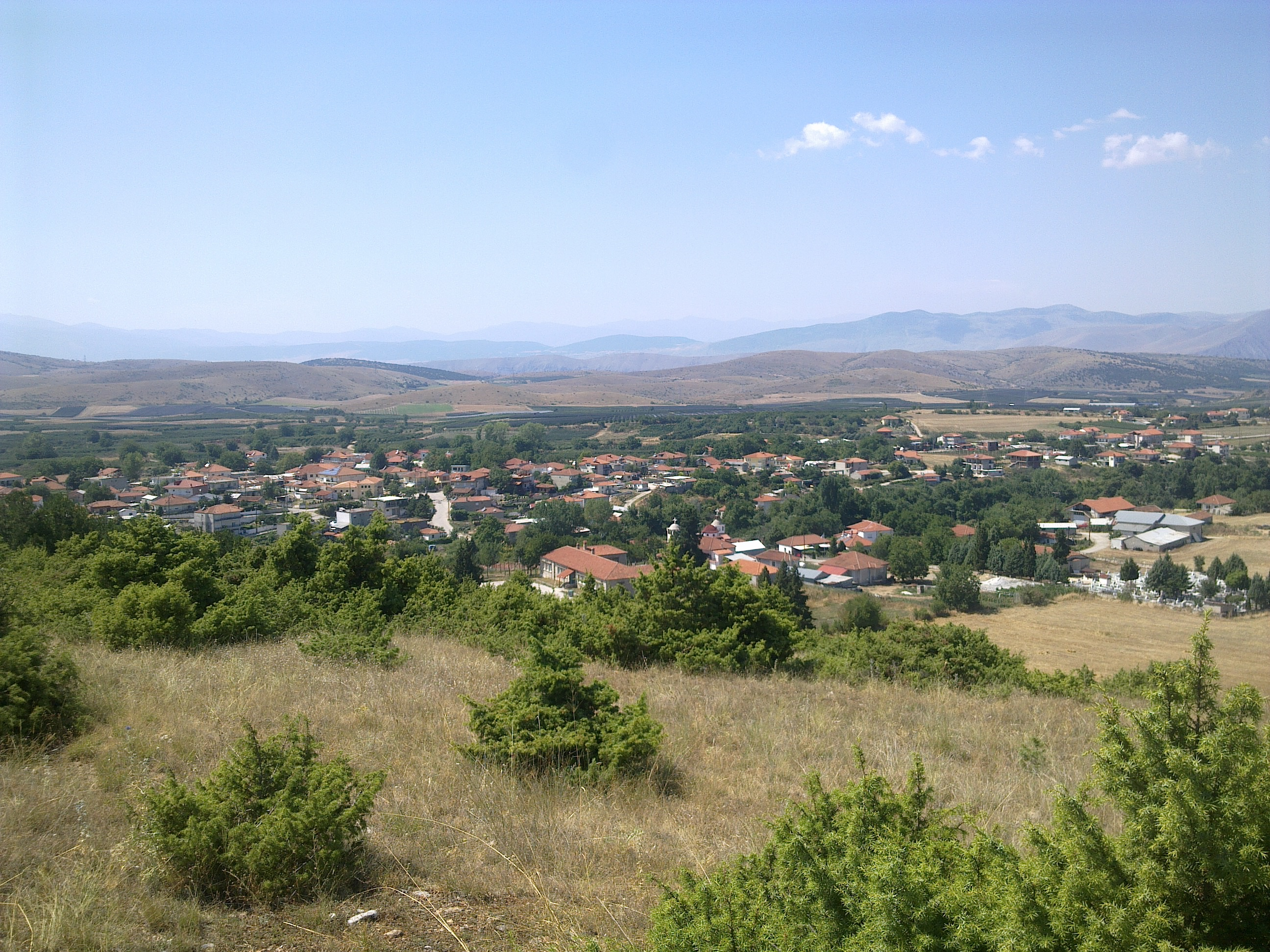

- Location within Greece
- Coordinates: 40°40.2′N 21°50′E
- Country: Greece
- Administrative region: West Macedonia
- Regional unit: Kozani
- Municipality: Eordaia
- Municipal unit: Vermio
- Elevation: 700 m (2,300 ft)

Population (2021)
  - Community: 745
- Time zone: UTC+2 (EET)
  - Summer (DST): UTC+3 (EEST)
- Postal code: 500 06
- Area code: +30-2463
- Vehicle registration: ΚΖ

Pyrgoi (Greek: Πύργοι, before 1927: Κατράνιτσα – Katranitsa) is a village and a community of the Eordaia municipality. It is located in Northern Greece, in the region of Western Macedonia. Before the 2011 local government reform it was part of the municipality of Vermio, of which it was a municipal district. The 2021 census recorded 745 inhabitants in the village.

== History ==
=== From classical antiquity to the Roman Empire ===
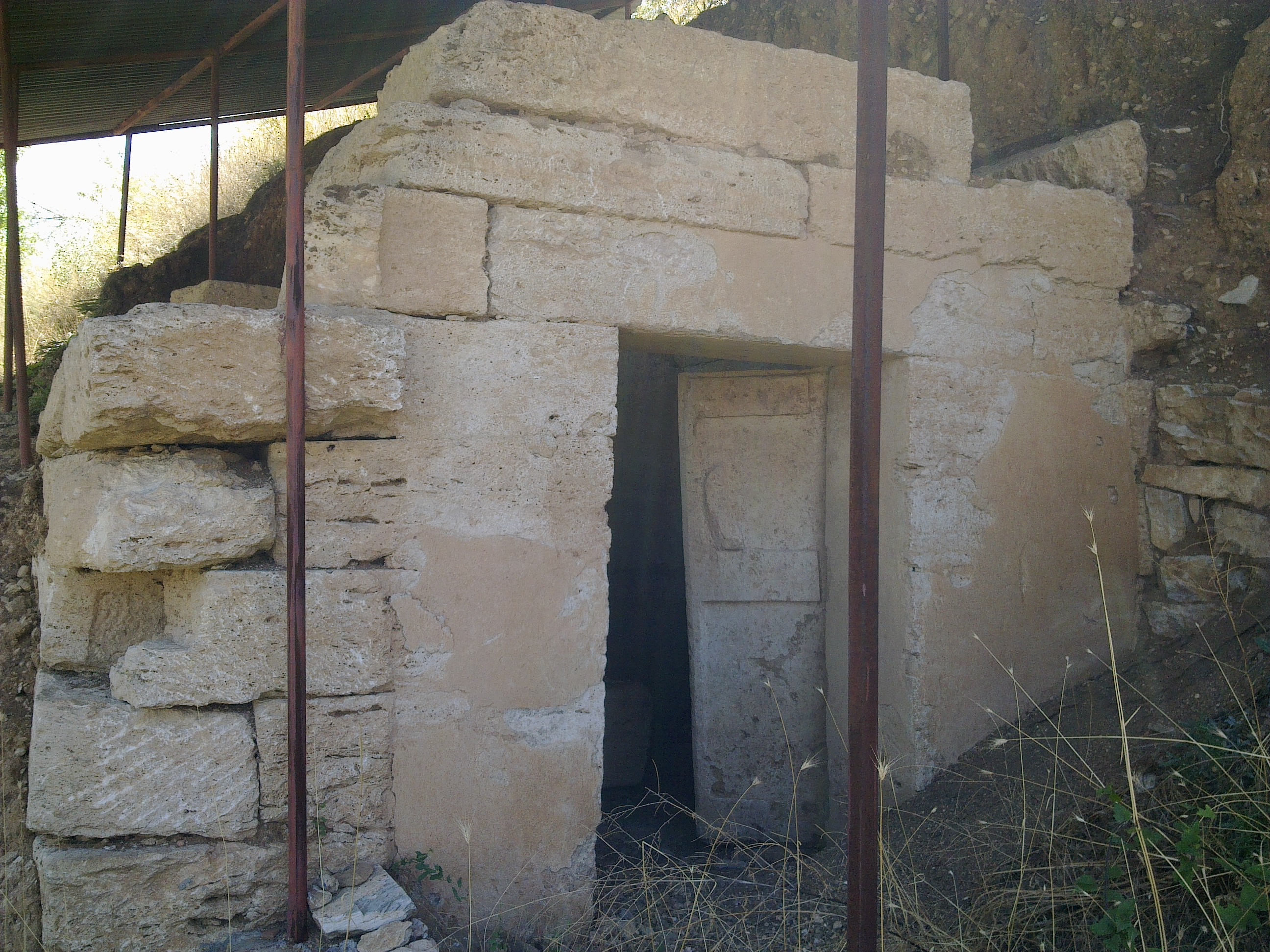
Ancient Greek Macedonian tomb near Pyrgoi (Katranitsa)

In a location near the village it can be concluded from archeological findings (coins, tombs, inscriptions) that there was an ancient settlement during the Hellenistic and Roman period, which was in control of a route that led from Eordaea to southern Macedonia.

Historian Margaritis Dimitsas in his work "Ancient Geography of Macedonia" places in the region of Pyrgoi the ancient city of Eordaea. He noted "...the capital city of Eordaea was located to the south east of lake Ostrovo. Katranitsa's (Pyrgoi) location seems to be similar to that of the ancient city, which had been maintained until the 10th century, when it was destroyed by Bulgarian invaders. The remnants of the city became Katranitsa.".

=== Ottoman Empire ===
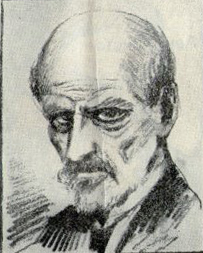
Petar Ichko, Greek diplomat from Pyrgoi who worked in Serbia.

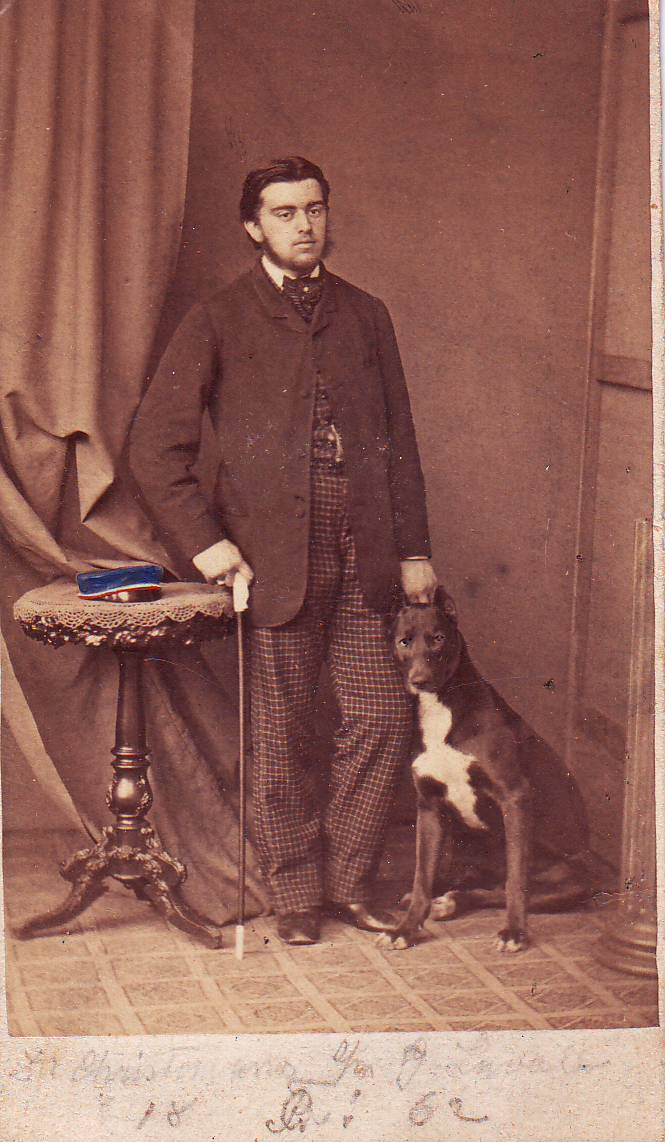
Anastasios Christomanos, member of the Christomanos family. He was an important Greek chemist.

In 1571, after the naval battle of Nafpaktos (October 7, 1571), there were Greek uprisings against the Ottomans in Katranitsa, and all over Macedonia.

During the Ottoman occupation the village flourished so much that it became known as "küçük Istanbul" (small Istanbul) and the Patriarchate upgraded it to a regional bishopric.This was due to the processing and trade of the region's wool products, which continued until its annexation to Greece. G. Kofinas, a department head at the Ministry of Finance, wrote in 1913: "In the villages of Katranitsa and Grammatikovo, there exists a declining traditional industry of thick and very sturdy coarse wool fabrics (sajiakia) woven by women. About seventy thousand picheis [cubits] of this fabric are exported to Epirus, Mainland Greece, and the Peloponnese." Contributing to this peak were the Treaties of Passarowitz (1718) and Belgrade (1739), concluded between the Ottoman and Habsburg Empires. These treaties allowed the subjects of both countries to engage in free trade. Many merchants from Western Macedonia and Epirus settled at that time in the border town of Semlin (modern-day Zemun). Among them, many natives of Katranitsa distinguished themselves, such as the Karamata family and Panagiotis Morphis, who served as the town's mayor from 1884 to 1893. Through Semlin, many people from Katranitsa traded with Vienna and eventually settled there. In Vienna, the Katranitsa diaspora community built the Church of Saint Paraskevi.

During this period, Katranitsa was the seat of a bishopric under the Metropolis of Moglena. According to the testimony of Ioakeim, former Metropolitan of Florina, Prespes, and Eordaia, 16th-century documents from the National Library mention the Bishopric of Katranitsa. Furthermore, the Bulgarian ecclesiastical historian Ivan Snegarov mentions that Katranitsa was the seat of a bishopric in the early 18th century. This is confirmed by a note dated April 17, 1737, in a liturgical book of the Monastery of the Nativity of the Theotokos in Dryovouno, Siatista. However, after 1759, when the majority of Christians in the Metropolis of Moglena underwent mass Islamization, its seat was transferred to Katranitsa, which was thus elevated to a metropolis. In the memorandum on the election of Metropolitan Germanos (1767), the metropolis is referred to as "Moglena and Katranitsa". With the burning of the village in 1822, the seat was transferred to neighboring Emporio, while during the tenure of Metropolitan Neofytos (1824–1828), it moved to Florina, with the title of the Metropolitan changing to "of Moglena and Florina".

In 1737, Christos Manos, a prominent merchant in Vienna and collaborator of Rigas Feraios, was born in Pyrgoi; he was the progenitor of the Christomanos family. Notably, descendants of the Christomanos family founded the School for the Blind in Kallithea, Athens, while his great-grandson Konstantinos Christomanos (Athens 1867 – November 1, 1911) was a tutor to Empress Elisabeth of Austria and the founder of the Nea Skini ('New Stage'), and is considered a reformer of Greek theater. Also from Pyrgoi, was the Greek klepht and revolutionary, Goutas, who was active in the 1740s in the regions of Western and Central Macedonia. In 1747, he is attested to have taken refuge and based his operations in the mountain village of Seli for years at the head of 300 men, fighting the Ottoman army and ultimately taking refuge in his home village victorious, but he finally was arrested in the same year in the city of Veria.

The professor of the National and Kapodistrian University of Athens Damianos Georgiou Draskas and Ioannis Karamatas (1864-1913), an important factor of the Hellenic community of Zeumon and founder of the first Greek typography of Serbia (his grandson was the prominent 20th century mathematician Giovan Karamata). From Pyrgoi also was the great diplomat and lawyer Peter Itskos who contributed to the diplomacy of the Serbian state.

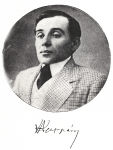
Constantine Christomanos, important figure to modern Greek theater.

According to the findings of geographer Dimitri Mishev (D. M. Brancoff), the town had a total Christian population of 1.600, of which all were Bulgarian Patriarchist Grecomans.

=== Greek War of Independence ===
During the Greek War of Independence, the inhabitants of Pyrgoi revolted and, in March 1822, 150 fighters under chieftain, Dimitris Karimitsos of Vlasti, exterminated large Ottoman forces in the area. Chieftain Dimitrios Sigaras from Pyrgoi took part in the revolt of Naoussa with his four brothers and 45 fighters from Pyrgoi. Also, from Pyrgoi was the Liaba family, members of which (such as the Emmanuel, Stergios, Constantine and George brothers) fought and died in the Naoussa massacre in 1822.

=== Macedonian Struggle ===
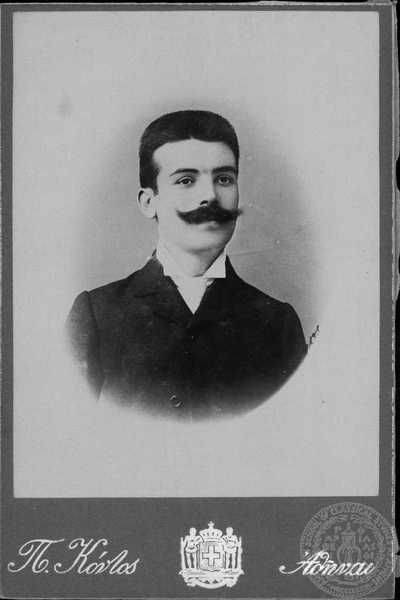
Filippos Kapetanopoulos

In the period of the Macedonian struggle, the town of Katranitsa (Pyrgoi) was used by Greek guerrillas as a base of excursion. The Greek Macedonian pharmacist Filippos Kapetanopoulos, who worked in Monastir and was a close associate of Pavlos Mela, was from Pyrgoi. He was killed fighting with the guerrilla body of Pavlos Melas, on September 19, 1904, just outside of Polipotamos, Florina.

Other Greeks from Pyrgoi who took part in the Macedonia struggle were Harisios Vantkoukis, Anastasios Vasdekis (1847-1931), Konstantinos Vasdekis, Markos Georgiou, Ioannis Kapetanopoulos, Petros Nicolaides, Antonios Pagiantsas, Stavros Hadjimitsos. They were involved in the armed phase of the Macedonian Struggle, most were part of Hellenic Macedonian Committee of Defense against the Bulgarians.

Finally, the Pyrgoi inhabitants: Michael Giorou, Antonios Dimou, Theodosios Theodorou, Thomas Kapetanopoulos, Michael Vasdekis (or Basdekis), Nikolaos Bitsiou, Michael Paraschou, Petros Paraschou, Georgios Sionis, Ioannis Stamboulis, Stavros Tsitsis, Markos Hadjitaskou and Stavros Hadjitaskou, were killed with axes by Bulgarian units on Mount Vermio on April 21, 1906.

Ottoman rule ended in Pyrgoi during the Balkan wars (1912-1913) and it became part of the Kingdom of Greece.

=== Interwar period ===
The 1920 Greek census recorded 2,180 people in the village, and 1,100 inhabitants were Muslim in 1923. Following the Greek–Turkish population exchange, Greek refugee families in the village were from Asia Minor (53) and Pontus (99) in 1926. The 1928 Greek census recorded 1,490 village inhabitants. In 1928, the refugee families numbered 139 (501 people).

=== Second World War (the Pyrgoi massacre) ===
On April 24, 1944 there was a massacre of civilians by German Nazis and their local accomplices. It was the second largest German-related massacre of Greece after that of Kalavryta. In 1944, the village had 1,882 inhabitants. As part of the German clearing operation in Western Vermio, code-named Maigewitter (May Storm), under the command of Colonel Karl Schümers, on April 23—following the retreat of ELAS advance units—SS units, reinforced by Italian soldiers and armed Turkish-speaking Greeks from Pelargos, occupied Pyrgoi. Those residents who attempted to flee into the forest were killed by machine-gun fire. They led 1,400 residents, who had been gathered in the square, to Ptolemaida. On the way, they executed two elderly women because they were unable to walk, as well as the schoolteacher Anastasia Siouli, as a communist. In the inns of Ptolemaida, they were guarded by men of Captain Kollaras. There, on April 24, seven more were executed as collaborators of the partisans. On the same day, they set fire to the entire village, except for twenty houses, three churches, the community hall, and the school. Those captured by the Germans among those who had fled to the forest, about 150–160 people, were locked in the Church of the Transfiguration (Metamorfosis) and handed over to their Turkish-speaking collaborators, led by Captain Tsakiroglou. On April 24, 25, and 26, they captured another fifty of those who had sought refuge in the forest and killed them. Afterwards, they left the village, leaving the detainees with their Turkish-speaking collaborators. The latter, after raping women and children inside the Church of the Transfiguration, locked the 150–160 hostages in adjacent barns and burned them alive. An annual memorial ceremony is held for the victims, where the president of Democracy of Greece visits the village.

== Notable people ==
- Christos Manos, Greek merchant and revolutionary
- Petar Ičko, Ottoman and Serbian diplomat
- Filippos Kapetanopoulos, pharmacist, fighter in the Macedonian Struggle
- Anastasios Christomanos, university professor and chemist

== Bibliography and External Links ==
- Papadrianos Ioannis (1988) Οι Έλληνες Πάροικοι του Σεμλίνου (18ος - 19ος αι.) (in Greek) [The Greek Community of Zemun (18th-19th cent.)]
- Pagiantzas N. M. - Kapetanopoulos A. K. (2023) Οι Πύργοι (Κατράνιτσα) της επαρχίας Εορδαίας νομού Κοζάνης [Pyrgoi (Katranitsa) of Eordaia Province, Kozani Prefecture] (in Greek), Thessaloniki.
- Dimaki Sofia (2022) Οπτικές των κατοίκων των Πύργων Εορδαίας για το ολοκαύτωμα του χωριού τους στις 23/24 Απριλίου του 1944. Μια συμβολή στην προφορική ιστορία. Μεταπτυχιακή διπλωματική εργασία στο Τμήμα Δημοτικής Εκπαίδευσης του Πανεπιστημίου Δυτικής Μακεδονίας] (in Greek) [Perspectives of the residents of Pyrgoi, Eordaia on the holocaust of their village on April 23/24, 1944: A contribution to oral history. Master's Thesis, Department of Primary Education, University of Western Macedonia] Florina.
- ΚΑΤΡΑΝΙΤΣΑ ΕΟΡΔΑΙΑΣ ΟΛΟΚΑΥΤΩΜΑ ΝΤΟΚΙΜΑΝΤΕΡ ΕΡΤ (in Greek) [KATRANITSA OF EORDAIA HOLOCAUST ERT DOCUMENTARY]
- Πύργοι Κοζάνης (Κατράνιτσα) 1944 - Oλοκαύτωμα (απόσπασμα εκπομπής της ΕΡΤ) (in Greek) [Pyrgoi of Kozani (Katranitsa) 1944 - Holocaust (excerpt from an ERT broadcast)
- Απόδοση τιμής ή αλλοίωση της συλλογικής μνήμης για τα γεγονότα της Κατοχής; Η περίπτωση των Πύργων Εορδαίας Κοζάνης (in Greek) [Paying tribute or distorting collective memory regarding the events of the Occupation? The case of Pyrgoi, Eordaia, Kozani]
- Το συγκινητικό μοιρολόι της Κατράνιτσας (in Greek) [The moving dirge of Katranitsa]
- Συνέντευξη του επιζώντα Ευστάθιου Χαϊτίδη (in Greek and German) [Interview with survivor Efstathios Chaitidis] (2016/12/16)
- «Πάνε, σβήσανε αυτά τα χρόνια»: Η ιστορία ενός επιζώντος του Ολοκαυτώματος των Πύργων (in Greek) ["Those years are gone, erased": The story of a survivor of the Pyrgoi Holocaust] (interview, 25/01/2020)
