= Filippos Kapetanopoulos =

Greek pharmacist and revolutionary fighter of the Macedonian Struggle

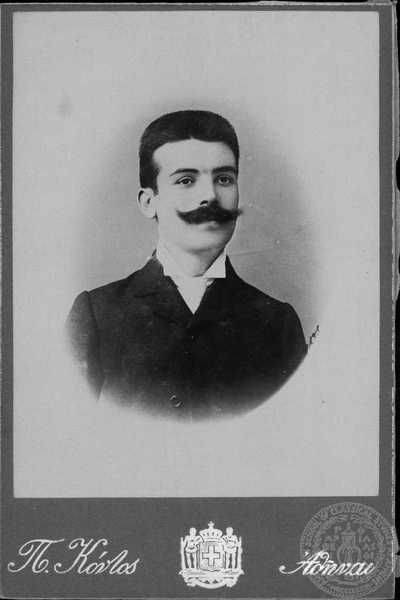
- A portrait of Filippos Kapetanopoulos.
- Native name: Φίλιππος Καπετανόπουλος
- Born: 1874; Katranitsa, Monastir Vilayet, Ottoman Empire (now Pyrgoi, Greece)
- Died: 19 September 1904 (aged 29–30) Polypotamos, Florina, Monastir Vilayet, Ottoman Empire (now Greece)
- Allegiance: Kingdom of Greece
- Branch: HMC
- Conflicts: Macedonian Struggle †
- Other work: Pharmacist

Filippos Kapetanopoulos (Greek: Φίλιππος Καπετανόπουλος; 1874–1904) was a Greek pharmacist in Monastir and a revolutionary fighter of the Macedonian Struggle.

== Life and Revolutionary Activity ==
Filippos Kapetanopoulos was born in 1876 in Katranitsa (now Pyrgoi), which was then part of the Ottoman Empire. He found work as a pharmacist in Monastir (now Bitola) before being initiated into the Hellenic Macedonian Committee in 1903 at the recommendation of the local Greek Consul Nikolaos Mavroudis. He served as part of the Defense Committee of Monastir, however, he was later relocated to his hometown of Katranitsa to organize local Hellenic Committees and recruit members. In September 1904, he joined the band of the renowned Pavlos Melas and became a close friend of his.

On September 19, 1904, Filippos Kapetanopoulos was killed in a skirmish with Ottoman Troops. Out of respect, Pavlos Melas removed his cloak to cover the body of his fallen comrade. However, in the pocket of that cloak was a letter for the Consul of Monastir which he forgot to remove. The letter was discovered by the Ottomans, which led to them to force the recall of the Greek consuls and pressure the Greek government.
