= Ptolemy I Soter =

Pharaoh of Egypt from 305 to 282 BC

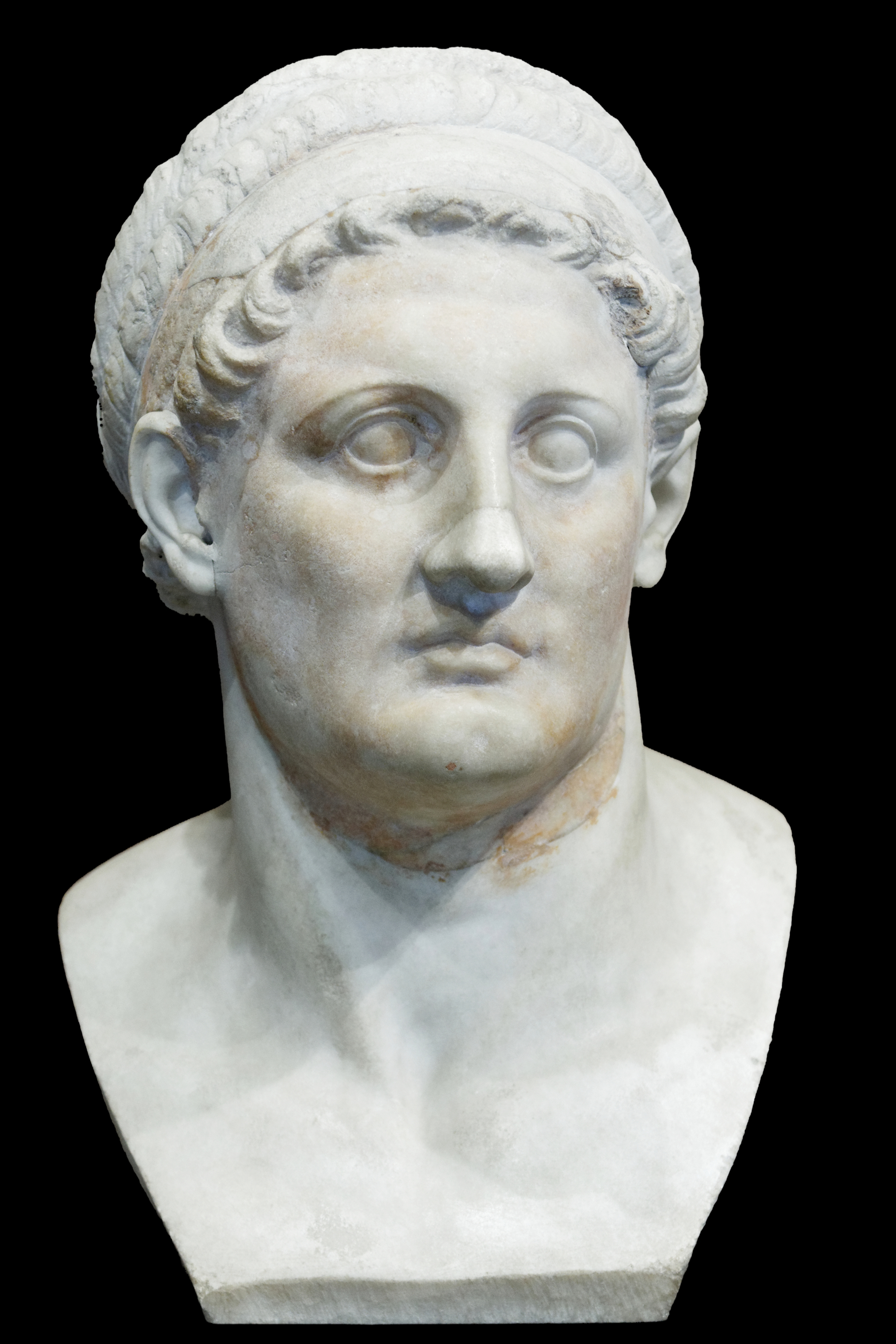
- Bust of Ptolemy I

Pharaoh and King of the Ptolemaic Kingdom
- Reign: 305 – 282 BC
- Predecessor: Alexander IV
- Successor: Ptolemy II Philadelphus
Royal titulary
Horus name
wr-pḥty nsw ḳni
Wer pehty nesu qeny
Great of strength and brave king
G5	wr r F9 F9 sw A43 q nw n a
Nebty name
iṯi m sḫm ḥḳꜢ ṯl
Itji em sekhem heqa tjel
Who has seized with (his own) power, the ruler of Sile
G16	V15 D40 U31 sxm U31 q HqA d l D40
Prenomen
stp n rꜤ mry imn
Setepenre meryimen
Chosen by Ra and beloved of Amun

M23 X1 L2 X1	C2 C12 stp n N36

M23 X1 L2 X1	C12 N36 n stp C2

M23 X1 L2 X1	C2 C12 s t p stp N36
Nomen
ptwlmys
Ptolemys
Ptolemy

G39 N5	p t wA l M i i s

G39 N5	p d A l M i i s

G39 N5	p d w l M i i s
- Consorts: Thaïs; Artakama; Eurydice; Berenice
- Children: Ptolemy Keraunos; Meleager; Arsinoe II; Philotera; Lysandra; Ptolemy II Philadelphus; Berenice; Irene; Lagus; Leontiscus; Ptolemais
- Father: Lagus
- Mother: Arsinoe of Macedon
- Born: c. 369/68 BC; Eordaea, Macedon, Greece
- Died: 282 BC (aged 86–87); Alexandria, Egypt
- Dynasty: Ptolemaic dynasty
- Military career
- Conflicts: Wars of Alexander the Great; Persian Campaign of Alexander the Great; Battle of Issus; Battle of the Persian Gate; Indian campaign of Alexander the Great; Cophen campaign; Wars of the Diadochi; First War of the Diadochi; Battle of the Camel Fort; Third War of the Diadochi; Battle of Gaza; Fourth War of the Diadochi; Battle of Salamis

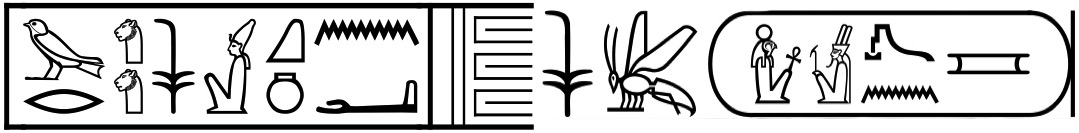
Ptolemy I Soter (/ˈtɒləmi/; Greek: Πτολεμαῖος Σωτήρ, Ptolemaîos Sōtḗr, "Ptolemy the Savior"; c. 369/68 BC – 282 BC) was a Macedonian Greek general, historian, and successor of Alexander the Great who went on to found the Ptolemaic Kingdom centered in Egypt. Ptolemy was king and pharaoh of Ptolemaic Egypt from 305/304 BC to his death in 282 BC, (Note: King's title, Great in strength and bravery, elected by the god Ra and loved by Amun) and his descendants continued to rule Egypt until 30 BC. During their rule, Egypt became a thriving bastion of Hellenistic civilization and Alexandria a great seat of Greek culture.

Ptolemy I was the son of Arsinoe of Macedon by her husband Lagus. Ptolemy was one of Alexander's most trusted companions and military officers. After the death of Alexander in 323 BC, Ptolemy retrieved his body as it was en route to be buried in Macedon, placing it in Memphis instead, where it was later moved to Alexandria in a new tomb. Afterwards he joined a coalition against Perdiccas, the royal regent over Philip III of Macedon. Perdiccas invaded Egypt but was assassinated by his own officers in 320 BC, allowing Ptolemy I to consolidate his control over the country. After a series of wars between Alexander's successors, Ptolemy gained a claim to Judea in southern Syria, which was disputed with the Seleucid king Seleucus I. He also took control of Cyprus and Cyrenaica, the latter of which was placed under the control of Ptolemy's stepson Magas. Ptolemy also commanded the construction of the Library of Alexandria and of the Lighthouse of Alexandria, one of the Seven Wonders of the Ancient World.

Ptolemy I may have married Thaïs, his mistress during the life of Alexander; he is known to have married the Persian noblewoman Artakama on Alexander's orders. He later married Eurydice, daughter of the Macedonian regent Antipater; their sons Ptolemy Keraunos and Meleager ruled in turn as kings of Macedon. Ptolemy's final marriage was to Eurydice's cousin and lady-in-waiting, Berenice I. Upon his death, he was succeeded by his son with Berenice, Ptolemy II.

== Early life and career ==
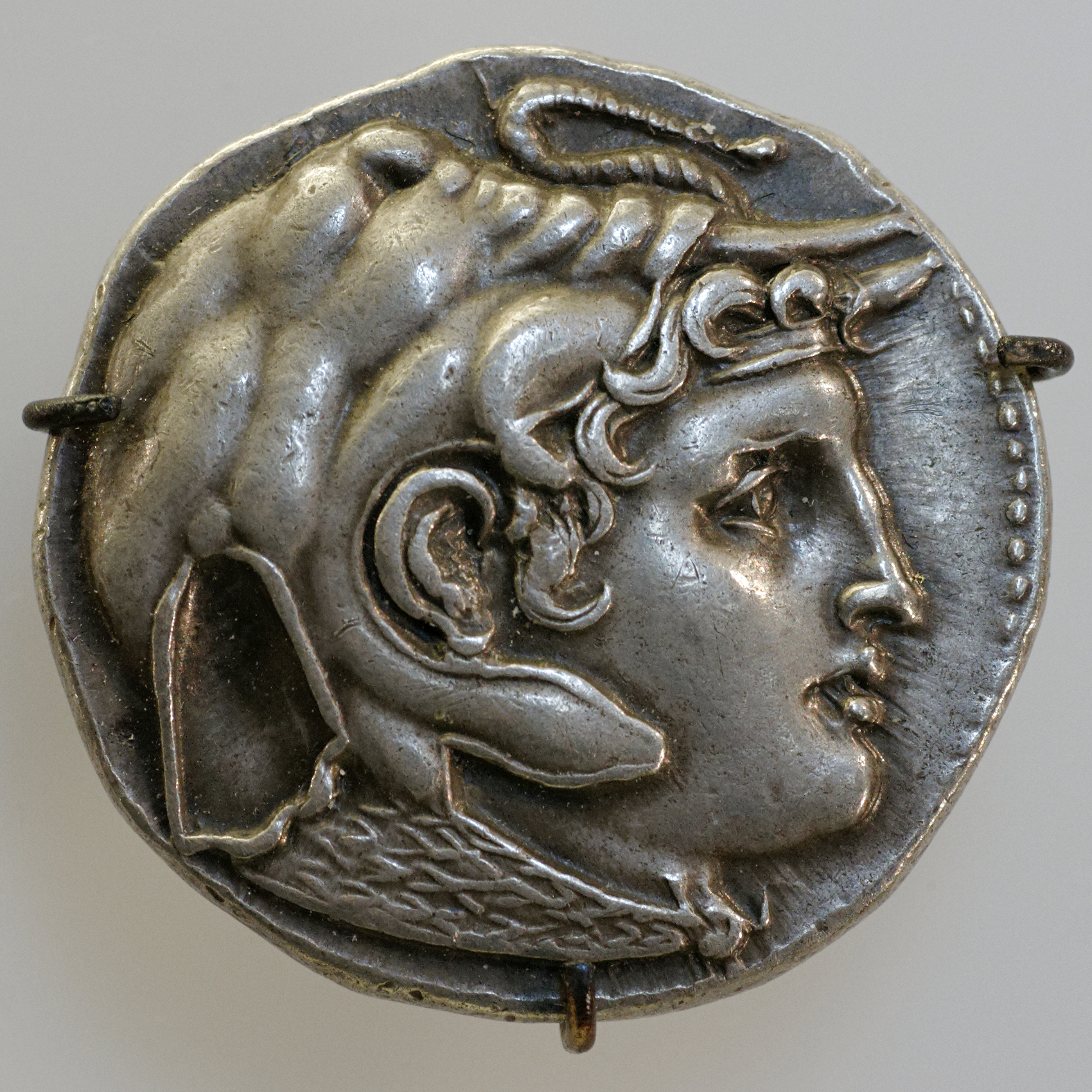
Ptolemaic coin showing Alexander the Great wearing an elephant scalp, a symbol of his conquest in India

Ptolemy was a Macedonian Greek, born between 369 and 368 BC. His mother was Arsinoe. According to Satyrus the Peripatetic, Arsinoe was a descendant of Alexander I of Macedon and thus a member of the Argead dynasty, claiming ultimate descent from Heracles. Ptolemy's father was Lagus, a Macedonian nobleman from Eordaea, but some ancient sources claim that he was actually an illegitimate son of Philip II of Macedon. (Note: "Firstly, Pausanias, Curtius and the Armenian recension of the Alexander Romance all declare Ptolemy to have been the illegitimate son of Philip II by Arsinoe.") If true, this would have made Ptolemy the half-brother of Alexander the Great. However, this has been rejected as a later myth fabricated to glorify the Ptolemaic dynasty. However, through his mother Ptolemy may have been a great-grandson of Amyntas I of Macedon, making him a member of the Argead royal house and a distant relative of Alexander, who was a great-great-grandson of Amyntas.

Ptolemy served with Alexander from his first campaigns, and was among the seven somatophylakes (bodyguards) of Alexander. He played a principal part in the later campaigns in Afghanistan and India. He participated in the Battle of Issus, commanding troops on the left wing under the authority of Parmenion. Later he accompanied Alexander during his journey to the Oracle in the Siwa Oasis where he was proclaimed a son of Zeus. Ptolemy had his first independent command during the campaign against the rebel Bessus whom his own guards captured and handed over to Ptolemy, who then handed him over to Alexander for execution.

== Successor of Alexander ==
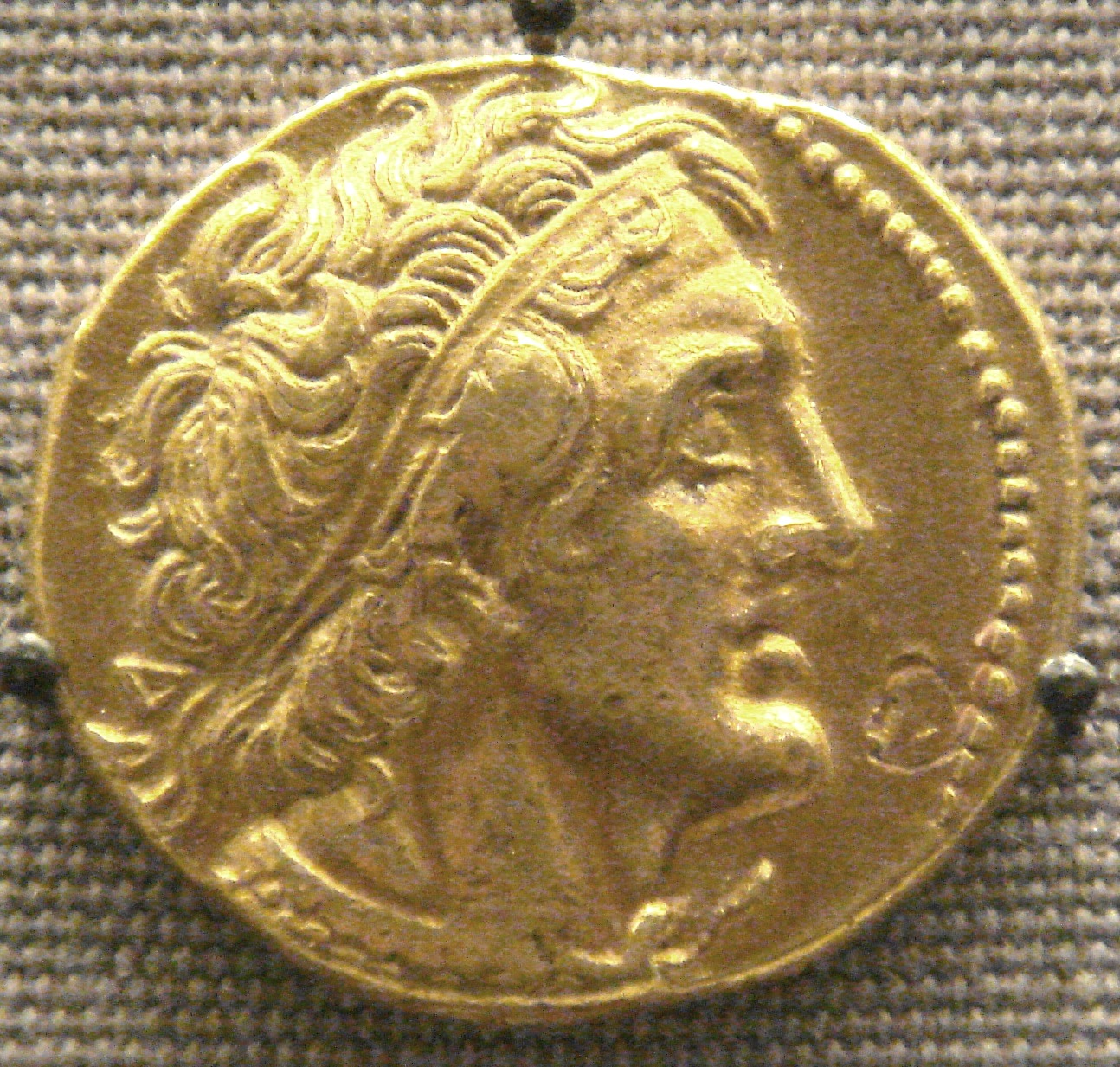
Coin of Ptolemy I, British Museum, London

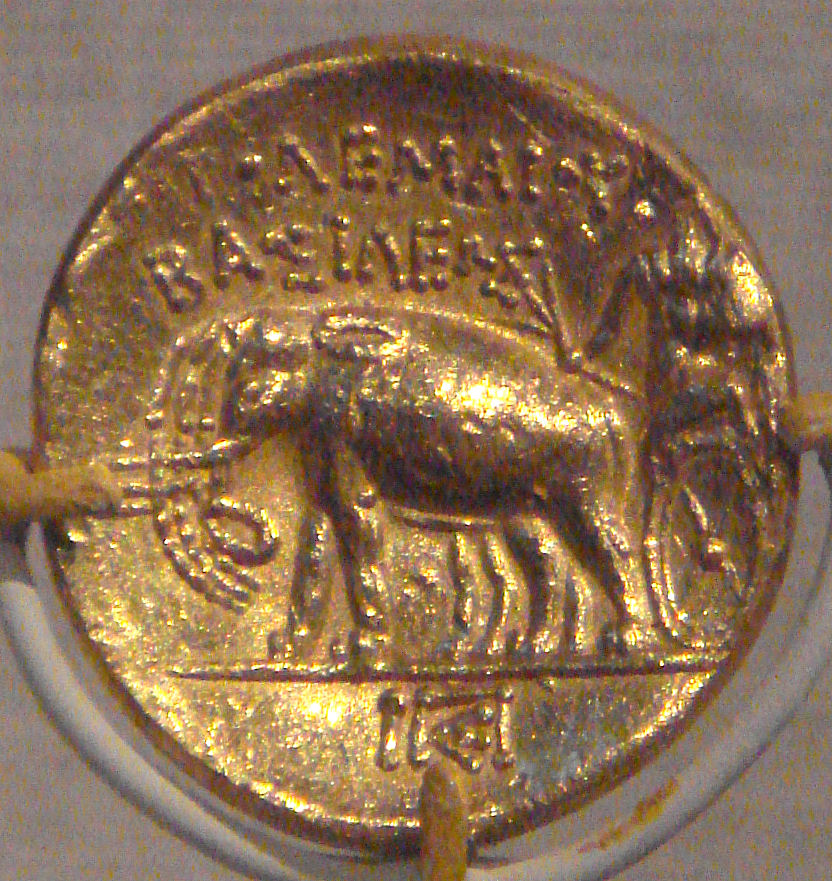
Ptolemy I gold stater with elephant quadriga, Cyrenaica

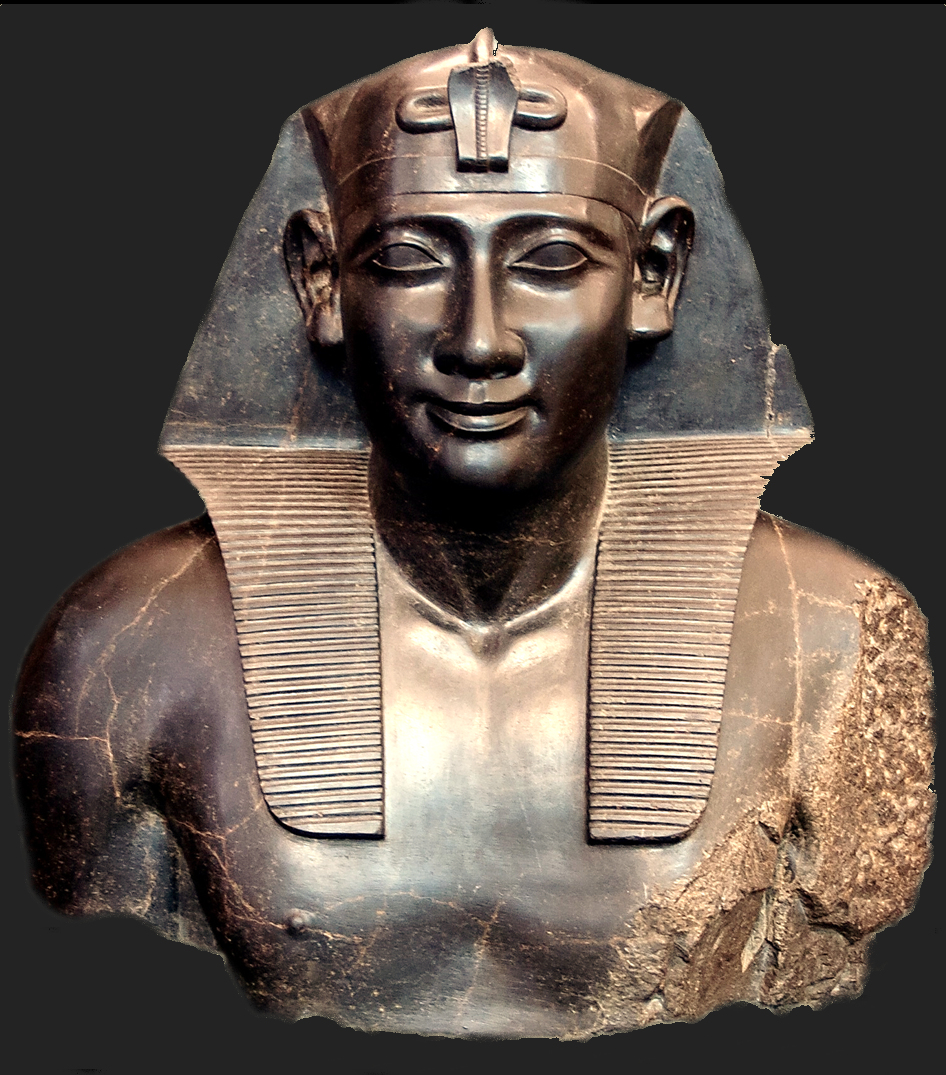
Ptolemy as Pharaoh in the British Museum

When Alexander died in 323 BC, Ptolemy is said to have instigated the settlement of the empire made at Babylon. Through the Partition of Babylon, he was appointed satrap of Egypt, under the nominal kings Philip III and the infant Alexander IV; the former satrap, the Greek Cleomenes, stayed on as his deputy. Ptolemy quickly moved, without authorization, to subjugate Cyrenaica.

By custom, kings in Macedonia asserted their right to the throne by burying their predecessor. Probably because he wanted to pre-empt Perdiccas, the imperial regent, from staking his claim in this way, Ptolemy took great pains in acquiring the body of Alexander the Great. On his deathbed, Alexander wished to be buried at the Temple of Zeus Ammon in the Siwa Oasis of ancient Libya instead of the royal tombs of Aigai in Macedon. However, his successors including Perdiccas attempted to bury his body in Macedon instead. In late 322 or early 321 BC, Alexander's body was in Syria, on its way to Macedon, when it was captured by Ptolemy I. He brought Alexander's remains back to Egypt, interring them at Memphis, but they were later moved to Alexandria where a tomb was constructed for them. Shortly after this event, Ptolemy openly joined the coalition against Perdiccas. Perdiccas appears to have suspected Ptolemy of aiming for the throne himself, and may have decided that Ptolemy was his most dangerous rival. Ptolemy executed Cleomenes for spying on behalf of Perdiccas; this removed the chief check on his authority, and allowed Ptolemy to obtain the huge sum that Cleomenes had accumulated.

== Rivalry and wars ==
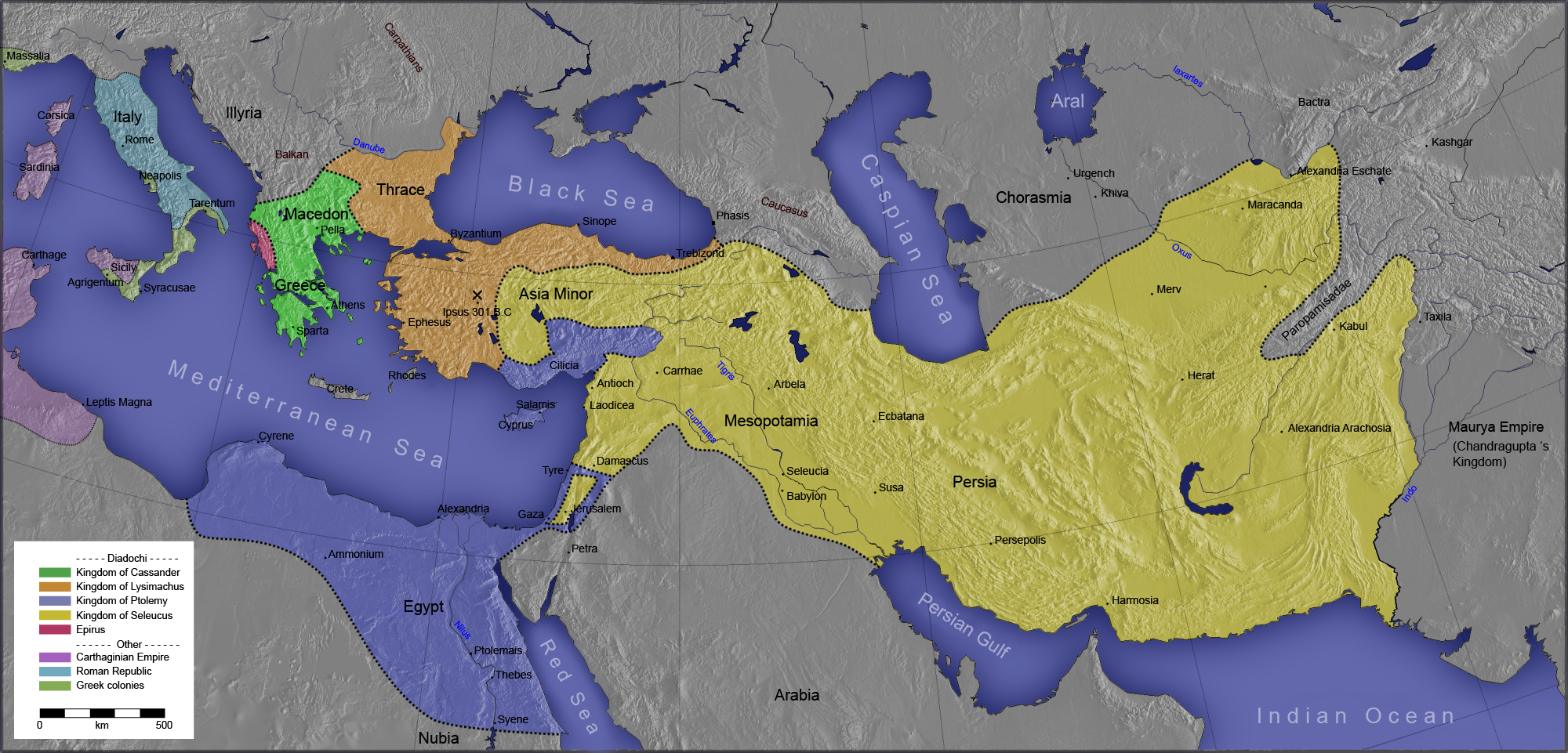
Kingdom of Ptolemy I Kingdom of Cassander Kingdom of Lysimachus Kingdom of Seleucus I Epirus Other: Carthage Rome Greek colonies

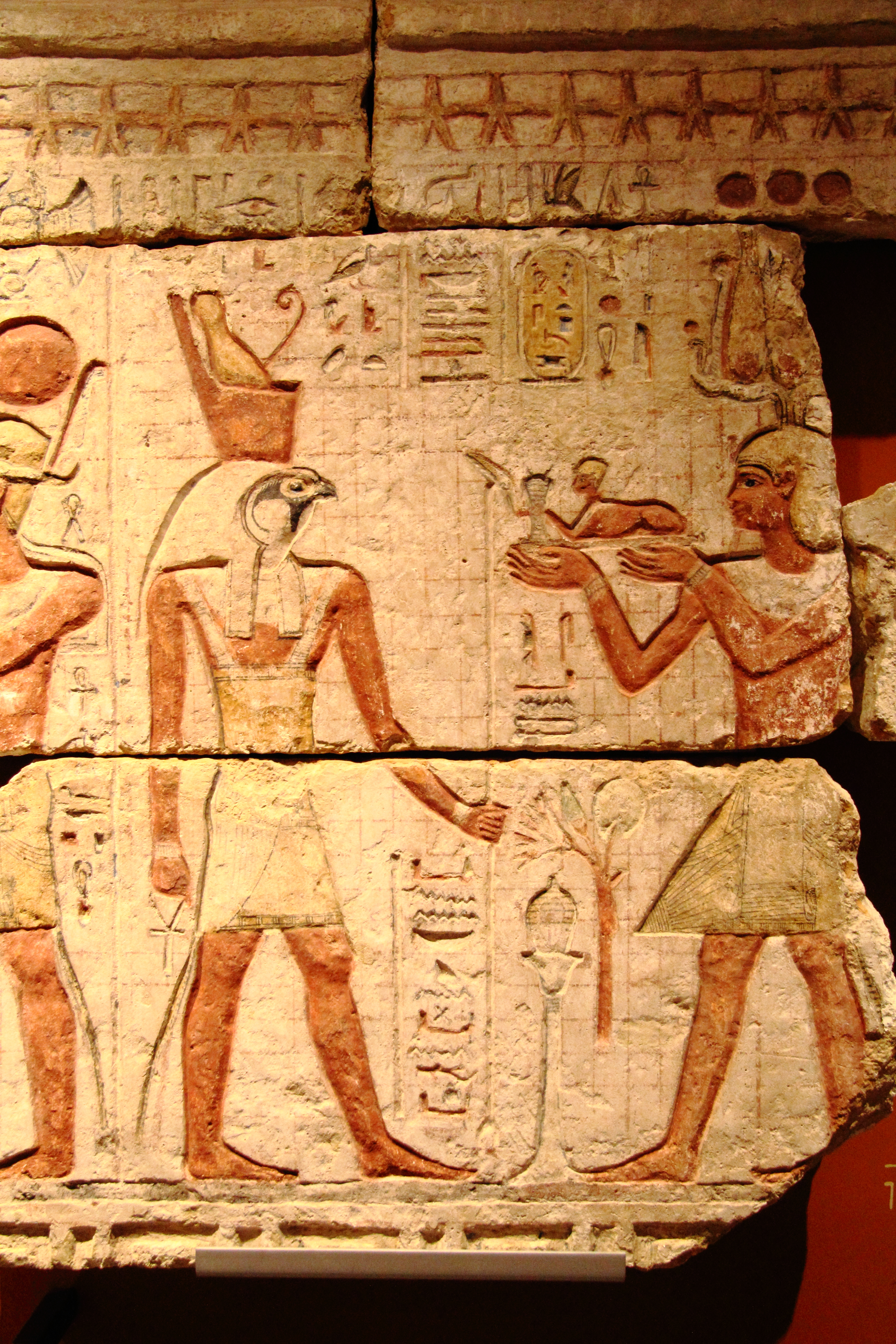
Relief from the cult chamber of Thoth in Tuna el-Gebel, painted limestone, reign of Ptolemy I Soter, ca. 295 BC

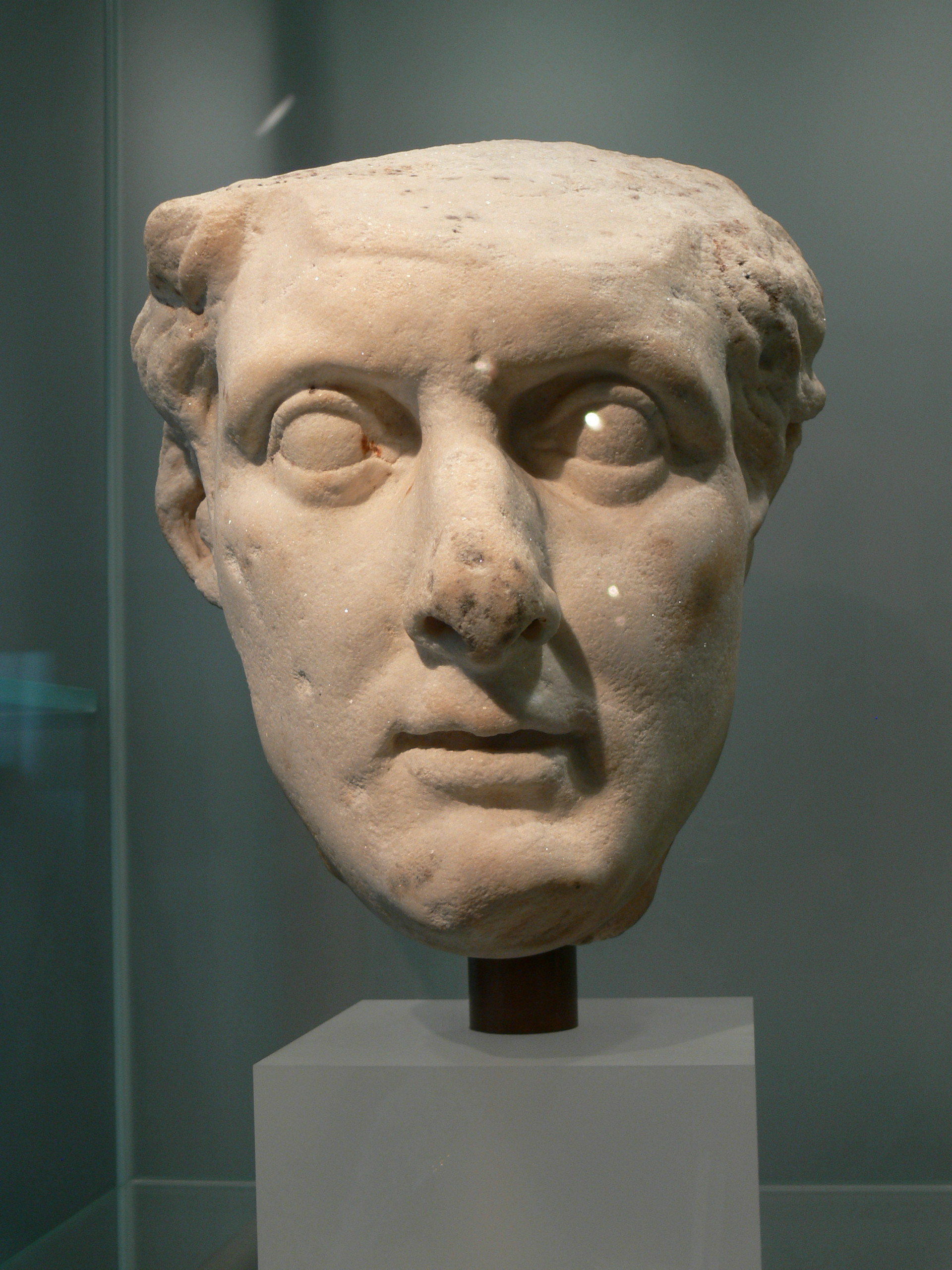
Ptolemy I, Ny Carlsberg Glyptotek, Copenhagen

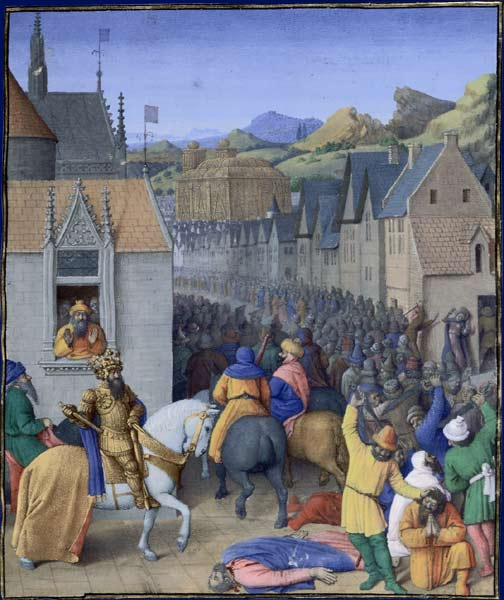
Capture of Jerusalem by Ptolemy I Soter

In 321 BC, Perdiccas attempted to invade Egypt, only to fall at the hands of his own men. Ptolemy's decision to defend the Nile against Perdiccas ended in fiasco for Perdiccas, with the loss of 2,000 men. This failure was a fatal blow to Perdiccas' reputation, and he was murdered in his tent by two of his subordinates. Ptolemy immediately crossed the Nile, to provide supplies to what had the day before been an enemy army. Ptolemy was offered the regency in place of Perdiccas, but he declined. Ptolemy was consistent in his policy of securing a power base, while never succumbing to the temptation of risking all to succeed Alexander.

In the long wars that followed between the different Diadochi, Ptolemy's first goal was to hold Egypt securely, and his second was to secure control in the outlying areas: Cyrenaica and Cyprus, as well as Syria, including the province of Judea. His first occupation of Syria was in 318, and he established at the same time a protectorate over the petty kings of Cyprus. When Antigonus I, master of Asia in 315, showed expansionist ambitions, Ptolemy joined the coalition against him, and on the outbreak of war, evacuated Syria. In Cyprus, he fought the partisans of Antigonus, and re-conquered the island (313). A revolt in Cyrene was crushed the same year.

In 312, Ptolemy and Seleucus, the fugitive satrap of Babylonia, both invaded Syria, and defeated Demetrius I, the son of Antigonus, in the Battle of Gaza. Again he occupied Syria, and again—after only a few months, when Demetrius had won a battle over his general, and Antigonus entered Syria in force—he evacuated it. In 311, a peace was concluded between the combatants. Soon after this, the surviving 13-year-old king, Alexander IV, was murdered in Macedonia on the orders of Cassander, leaving the satrap of Egypt absolutely his own master.

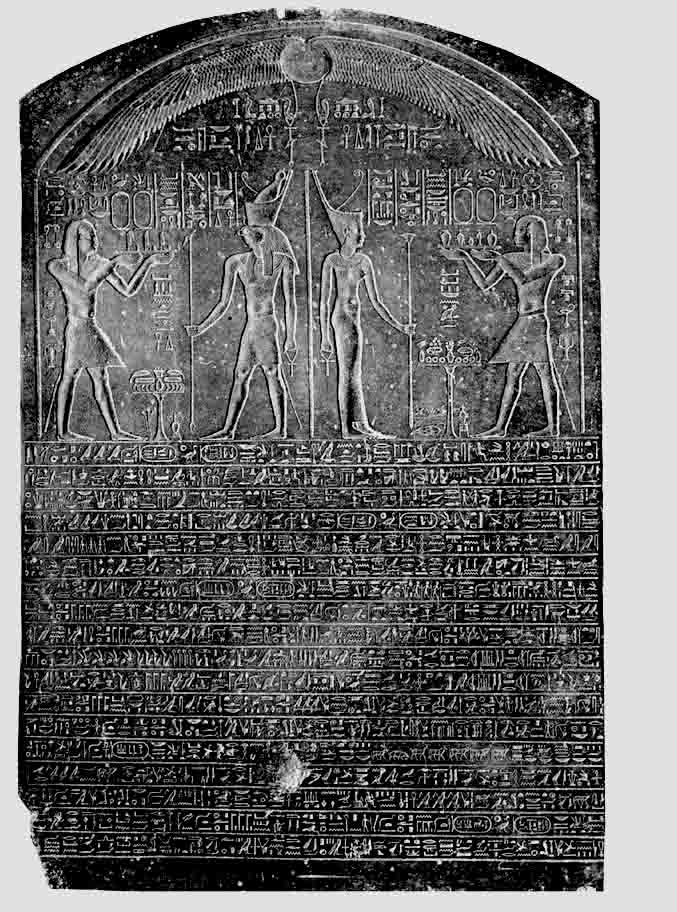
The "Satrap Stele" was dedicated in commemoration of the rights restoration at the city Buto after Ptolemy Lagides victory over Demetrius Poliorcetes in battle at Gaza in 312 BC.

The peace did not last long, early in 310 he was informed that his ally Nicocles of Paphos was planning to defect to Antigonus; he sent some agents, who together with his brother Menelaus, who was still on Cyprus with an army, dealt with the situation, they surrounded Nicocles palace and forced him to commit suicide. In 309 Ptolemy personally commanded a fleet which detached the coastal towns of Phaselis, Xanthos, Kaunos, Iasos and Myndus in Lycia and Caria from Antigonus, then crossed into Greece, where he took possession of Corinth, Sicyon and Megara (308 BC). In 306, a great fleet under Demetrius attacked Cyprus, and Ptolemy's brother Menelaus was defeated and captured in another decisive Battle of Salamis. Ptolemy's complete loss of Cyprus followed.

The satraps Antigonus and Demetrius now each assumed the title of king; Ptolemy, as well as Cassander, Lysimachus and Seleucus I Nicator, responded by doing the same. In the winter of 306 BC, Antigonus tried to follow up his victory in Cyprus by invading Egypt; but Ptolemy was strongest there, and successfully held the frontier against him. Ptolemy led no further overseas expeditions against Antigonus. However, he did send great assistance to Rhodes when it was besieged by Demetrius (305/304). The Rhodians granted divine honors to Ptolemy as a result of the lifting of the siege.

When the coalition against Antigonus was renewed in 302, Ptolemy joined it, and invaded Syria a third time, while Antigonus was engaged with Lysimachus in Asia Minor. On hearing a report that Antigonus had won a decisive victory there, he once again evacuated Syria. But when the news came that Antigonus had been defeated and slain by Lysimachus and Seleucus at the Battle of Ipsus in 301, he occupied Syria a fourth time.

The other members of the coalition had assigned all Syria to Seleucus, after what they regarded as Ptolemy's desertion, and for the next hundred years, the question of the ownership of southern Syria (i.e., Judea) produced recurring warfare between the Seleucid and Ptolemaic dynasties. Henceforth, Ptolemy seems to have involved himself as little as possible in the rivalries between Asia Minor and Greece; he lost what he held in Greece, but reconquered Cyprus in 295/294. Cyrenaica, after a series of rebellions, was finally subjugated in about 300 and placed under his stepson Magas.

== Marriages, children, and succession ==
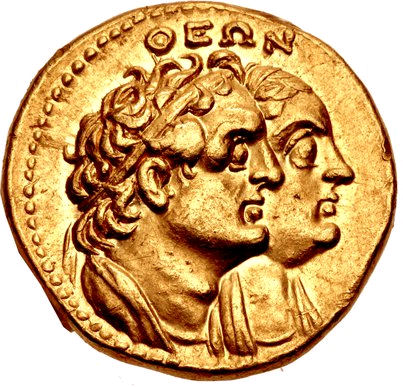
Coin of Ptolemy I and Berenice I

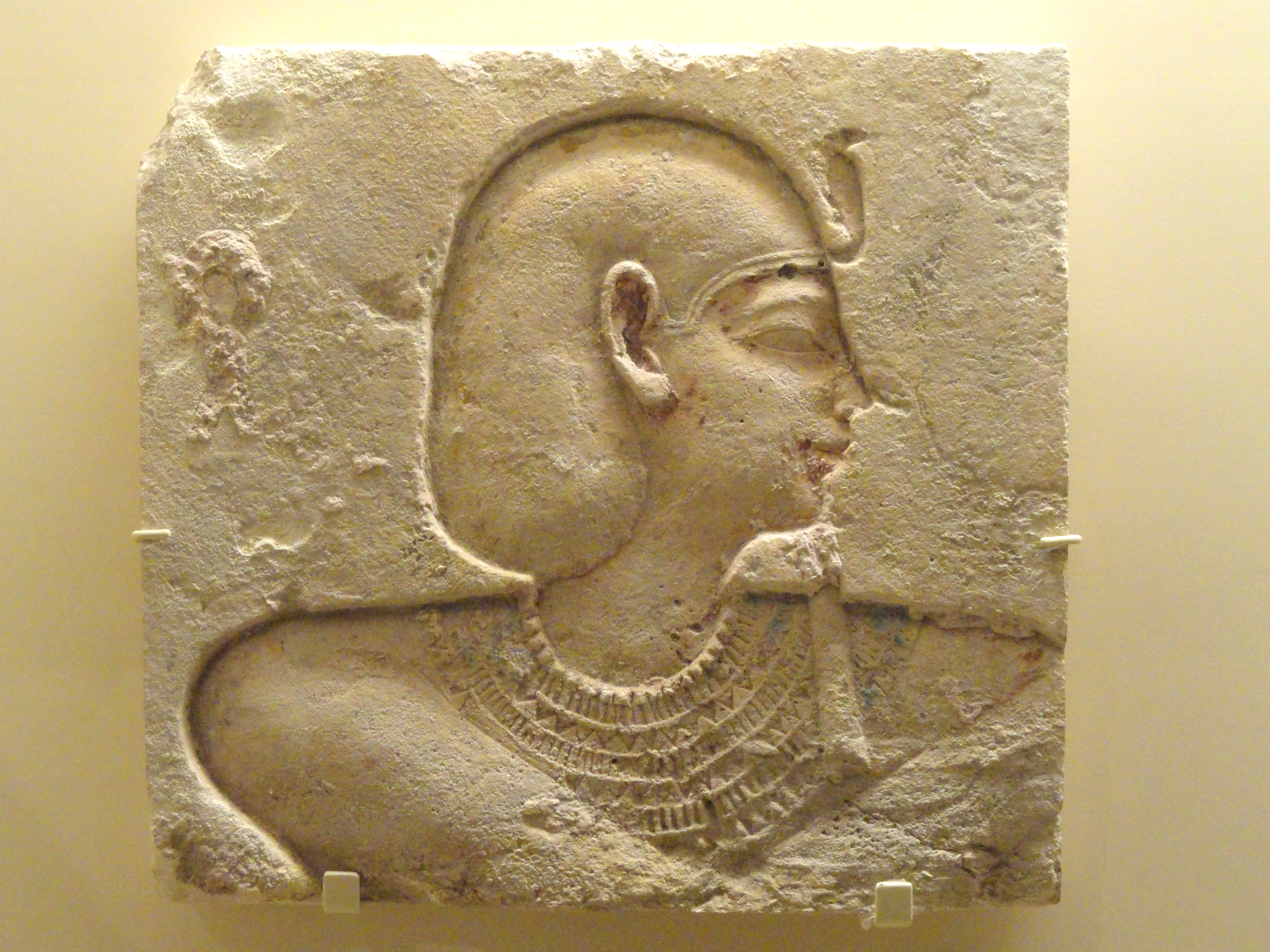
Depiction of Ptolemy I or II, Royal Ontario Museum

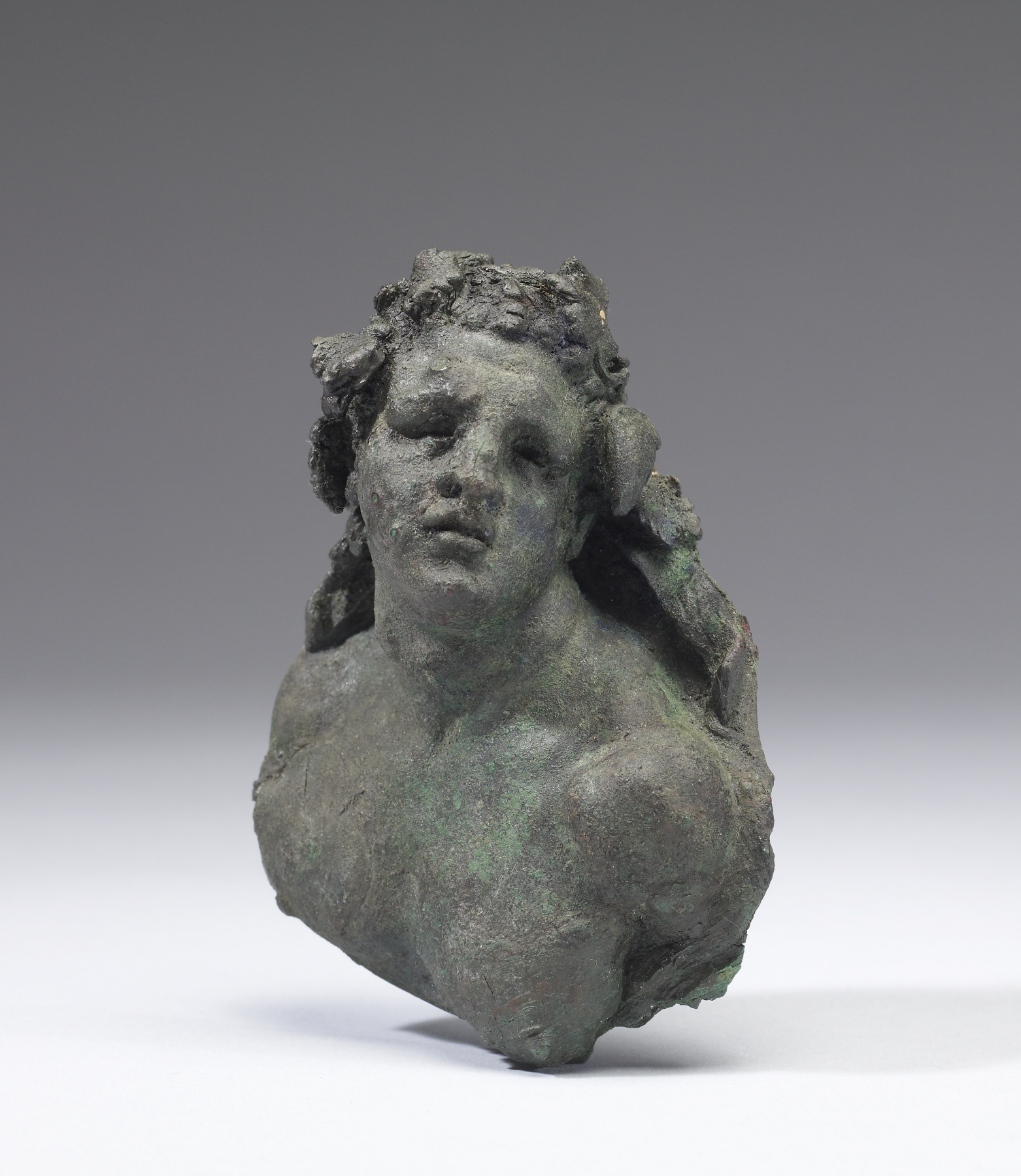
Ptolemy I depicted as Dionysus

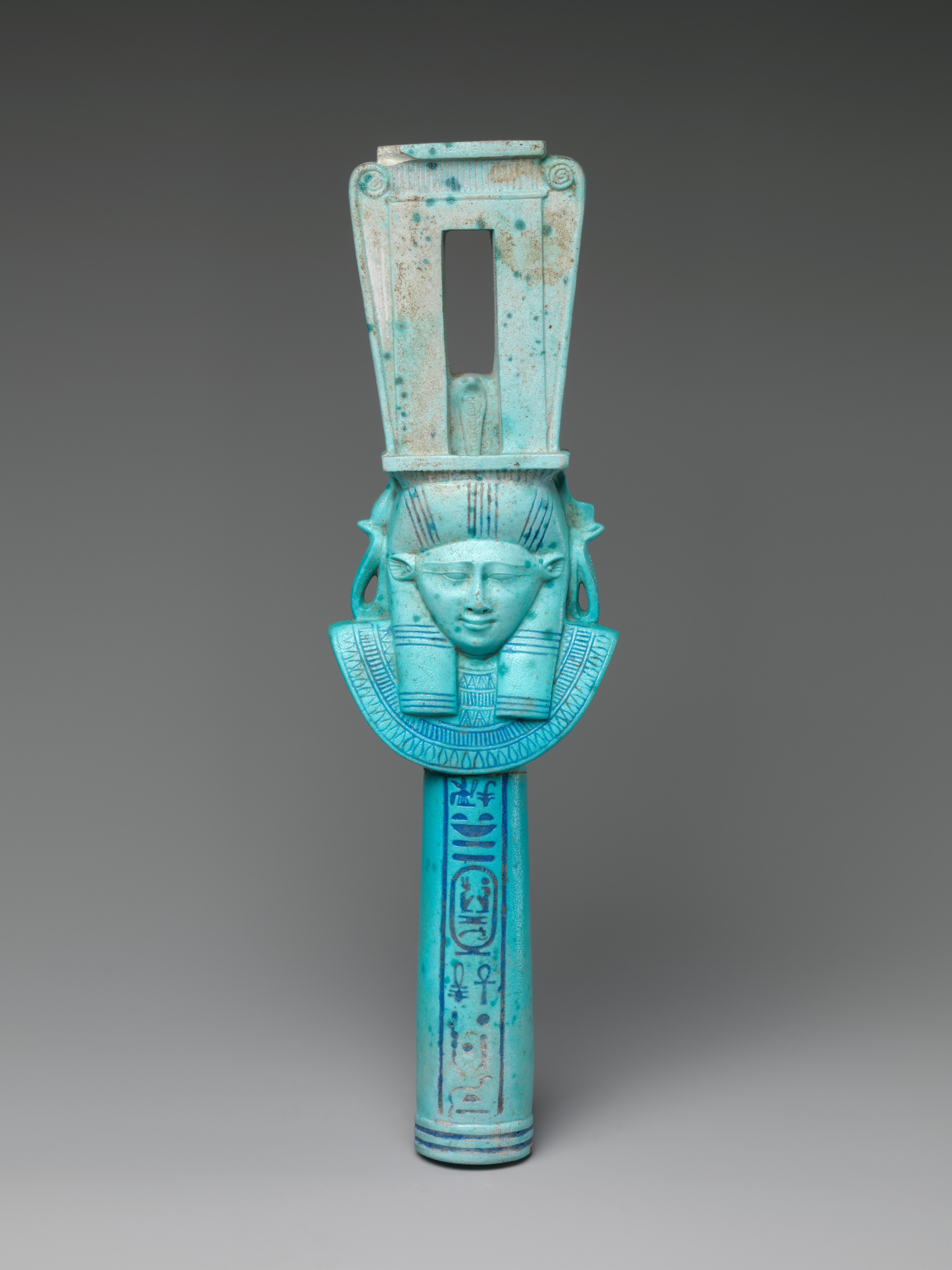
Faience Sistrum Inscribed with the Name of Ptolemy I

While Alexander was alive, Ptolemy had three children with his mistress Thaïs, who may also have been his wife: Lagus; Leontiscus; and Eirene, who was given in marriage to Eunostos of Soloi in Cyprus. During the Susa weddings, Ptolemy married Persian noblewoman Artakama, as ordered by Alexander the Great. Around 322 BC, he married Eurydice, daughter of Antipater, regent of Macedonia. They had five children before she was repudiated: three sons–Ptolemy Ceraunus, king of Macedon from 281 BC to 279 BC; his brother and successor Meleager, who ruled for two months in 279 BC; and a 'rebel in Cyprus' who was put to death by his half-brother Ptolemy II—as well as the daughters Ptolemais, who married Demetrius I of Macedon, and Lysandra, first married to Alexander V of Macedon and after to Lysimachus' son Agathocles. Ptolemy married once more to Berenice, Eurydice's cousin, who had come to Egypt as Eurydice's lady-in-waiting with the children from her first marriage to Philip. Their children were Arsinoe II, Philotera, and Ptolemy II. Their eldest child Arsinoe married Lysimachus, then her half-brother Ptolemy Keraunos, and finally her full brother Ptolemy II.

In 285, Ptolemy made his son Ptolemy II his co-regent. His eldest legitimate son, Ptolemy Keraunos, fled to the court of Lysimachus. Ptolemy I died in 282. Shrewd and cautious, he had a compact and well-ordered realm to show at the end of forty years of war. His reputation for good nature and liberality attached the floating soldier-class of Macedonians and other Greeks to his service, and was not insignificant; nor did he wholly neglect conciliation of the natives. He was a ready patron of letters, founding the Great Library of Alexandria. The Ptolemaic dynasty which he founded ruled Egypt for nearly three hundred years. It was a Hellenistic kingdom known for its capital Alexandria, which became a center of Greek culture. Ptolemaic rule ended with the death of Cleopatra VII in 30 BC.

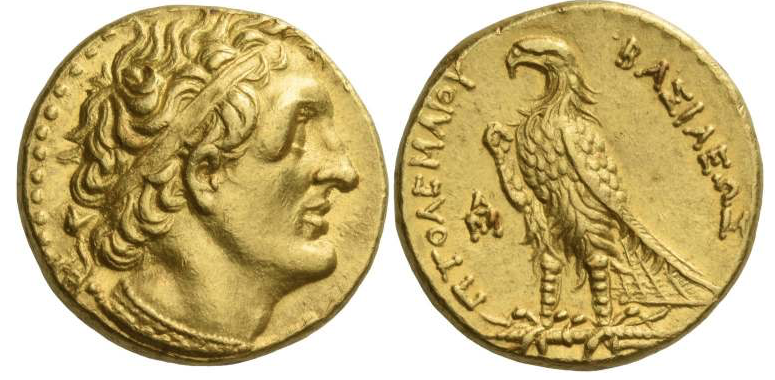
Ptolemy Soter gold pentadrachm

== Economic reforms ==
The Ptolemaic economy consisted of two ancient economic systems, linked by a bureaucratic hierarchy, but also by increased market activity, which was stimulated by the minting of coins and the formation of a state-controlled fiscal policy. The main sources of income were based on the cultivation of grain and the proceeds from the circulation of money, from its own trade, as well as tax revenues from the movement of goods. Another element of economic development was the ability to transport in the Mediterranean region, where the port of Alexandria played a dominant role.

The Ptolemies directly owned almost half of Egypt's agricultural land, and Egyptian exports of grain, linen, and other goods helped finance the expansion of the empire. The population is estimated to have been about 3 million, and anyone who produced cloth, papyrus, or beer also had to comply with strict government controls and pay taxes on their sales. One advantage of all these processes was that the government could pay for improvements to the system and strengthen the economy. This included irrigation projects that expanded agricultural land. In practice, Egypt was divided into administrative provinces called nomes. At the nome level, officials dealt with municipal and village authorities to resolve economic issues such as land administration, taxation, and currency circulation. The Macedonians and Greeks who owned the land and traded its proceeds did not work the land themselves the tenant farmers were mostly local Egyptians.

The evolving fiscal policy was based on reforms in the circulation of monetary units—coins—minted from precious metals (gold, silver, copper) as early as the 5th–4th centuries BC (for example, under Pharaoh Nectanebo II of the 30th Dynasty). At the time of Alexander's conquest of Egypt, the Egyptian economy was in the early stages of monetisation. The main coin was the Athenian silver tetradrachm, called the owl which served as international currency in Egypt and the Levant in the 5th and 4th centuries BC. The owls circulating in Egypt included coins from the Athenian mint, as well as imitations minted locally, in the Nile Delta and around Memphis, but also in more distant areas such as the island of Elephantine and the oasis of Kharga.

Ptolemy Soter, after consolidating his position as satrap, around 310–311 BC, transformed Egypt into a closed monetary zone, which necessitated the exchange of foreign currencies at all points of entry into Egypt. This provided a new source of revenue for the state. Resources of gold and copper were relatively abundant, but silver, the standard of Hellenistic currency, was always scarce in Egypt and had to be imported. To cope with the limited supply of silver, Ptolemy Soter reduced the silver and gold drachmas to 80% of their original weight by 305 BC. The standard of Ptolemaic currency as a whole was then frequently changed, especially when later rulers devalued the currency by reducing its precious metal content to finance their wars or cope with economic hardship. Around 299 BC, Ptolemy I Soter replaced the older gold stater of Alexander with his own image on the obverse, with coins whose weight was adjusted to the standard 14.25 g.

This not only distinguished Egypt from other territories, but also, perhaps more importantly, allowed Ptolemy to expand his currency supply to keep up with the growth of military and judicial spending. Aspects of these later reforms included the creation of fiscal institutions that increased state revenues, and most notably a closed monetary zone with mandatory exchange of other coins at the borders. Around 294 BC a commission was tasked with exchanging gold for silver. The history of his monetary reforms shows him to have been an unusually energetic and capable ruler, as a result of which, together with his military successes, he was recognised as the legitimate pharaoh of Egypt.

== Work as a historian ==
Ptolemy himself wrote an eyewitness history of Alexander's campaigns (now lost). In the second century AD, Ptolemy's history was used by Arrian of Nicomedia as one of his two main primary sources (alongside the history of Aristobulus of Cassandreia) for his own extant Anabasis of Alexander, and hence large parts of Ptolemy's history can be assumed to survive in paraphrase or précis in Arrian's work. Arrian cites Ptolemy by name on only a few occasions, but it is likely that large stretches of Arrian's Anabasis reflect Ptolemy's version of events. Arrian once names Ptolemy as the author "whom I chiefly follow", and in his Preface writes that Ptolemy seemed to him to be a particularly trustworthy source, "not only because he was present with Alexander on campaign, but also because he was himself a king, and hence lying would be more dishonourable for him than for anyone else".

Ptolemy's lost history was long considered an objective work, distinguished by its straightforward honesty and sobriety, but more recent work has called this assessment into question. R. M. Errington argued that Ptolemy's history was characterised by persistent bias and self-aggrandisement, and by systematic blackening of the reputation of Perdiccas, one of Ptolemy's chief dynastic rivals after Alexander's death. For example, Arrian's account of the fall of Thebes in 335 BC (Anabasis 1.8.1–1.8.8, a rare section of narrative explicitly attributed to Ptolemy by Arrian) shows several significant variations from the parallel account preserved in Diodorus Siculus (17.11–12), most notably in attributing a distinctly unheroic role in proceedings to Perdiccas. More recently, J. Roisman has argued that the case for Ptolemy's blackening of Perdiccas and others has been much exaggerated.

== Relationship with Euclid ==
Ptolemy personally sponsored the great mathematician Euclid. He found Euclid's seminal work, the Elements, too difficult to study, so he asked if there were an easier way to master it. According to Proclus, Euclid famously quipped: "Sire, there is no Royal Road to geometry."

== See also ==
- History of Ptolemaic Egypt
- Serapis, Greco-Egyptian god, promoted by Ptolemy

Ptolemy I Soter Ptolemaic Dynasty Born: 369/68 BC Died: 282 BC
Preceded by Alexander IV	Pharaoh of Egypt; 305/304–282 BC	Succeeded by Ptolemy II
