= Arsinoe of Macedon =

4th-century BC Macedonian woman

Arsinoe of Macedon (Ancient Greek: Ἀρσινόη; lived 4th century BC) was an ancient Macedonian noblewoman and the mother of Ptolemy I Soter (323 – 283 BC), king of Ptolemaic Egypt.

Arsinoe was of the Argead dynasty, and originally a concubine of Philip II, king of Macedon, and it is said she was given by Philip to Lagus, a Macedonian nobleman, while she was pregnant with Ptolemy I Soter, but this has been rejected as a later myth fabricated to glorify the Ptolemaic Dynasty. Alternately, Ptolemy's lineage to the Argead dynasty was found through his mother, Arsinoe. In this case Arsinoe is daughter of Meleager, who was a cousin of Amyntas III and son of Balacrus, son of Amyntas, son of Alexander I of Macedon. Contemporary and modern research concludes the latter claim much more valid than Philip II as Ptolemy’s father, now dismissed as a myth.
