= Lagus =

Father of Ptolemy I Soter

- Born: 4th c. BC
- Died: 4th c. BC
- Spouse: Arsinoe of Macedon
- Issue: Ptolemy I, Pharaoh of Egypt
- Ancient Greek: Λᾶγος
- House: Ptolemaic dynasty

Lagus of Eordaia (Ancient Greek: Λᾶγος, Lagos; lived 4th century BC) was a Macedonian courtier and the father of Ptolemy, the founder of the Ptolemaic dynasty. He married Arsinoe of the Argead dynasty and a concubine of Philip II, king of Macedon, who was said to have been pregnant at the time of their marriage, forming the basis of Ptolemy as the son of Philip; but it is possible that this is a later myth fabricated to glorify the Ptolemaic dynasty. From an anecdote recorded by Plutarch, it is clear that Lagus was a man of obscure birth; hence, when Theocritus calls Ptolemy a descendant of Heracles, he probably means to represent him as the son of Philip. Lagus and Arsinoe also were parents to Menelaus.

== Misreading ==
Lagus is believed by some to have subsequently married Antigone, niece of Antipater, by whom he became the father of Berenice, afterwards the wife of Ptolemy, but this is based on a misreading of a corrupt scholium; her father's name was almost certainly Magas.

== Lagus (Lykaionike) ==
Lagus (son of Ptolemy), winner in Synoris Arcadian Lykaia 308 BC, may be a relative of the Lagus family.
