= Spilia, Kozani =

Village in Kozani regional unit, West Macedonia, Greece

Spilia Σπηλιά
- Community
- Location within Greece
- Coordinates: 40°29′47″N 21°48′37″E
- Country: Greece
- Administrative region: Western Macedonia
- Regional unit: Kozani
- Municipality: Eordaia
- Municipal unit: Agia Paraskevi

Population (2021)
  - Community: 35
- Time zone: UTC+2 (EET)
  - Summer (DST): UTC+3 (EEST)
- Postal code: 50200
- Area code: +30 2463

Spilia is a village located in Agia Paraskevi municipal unit, Kozani regional unit, West Macedonia, Greece. Ptolemaida is 25 km northwest of Spilia.

Spilia is situated at an altitude of 820 meters. At the 2021 census, the population was 35.

== Archaeological site ==
A portion of Via Egnatia, an ancient Roman road, passes through Spilia. An archaeological site of the ancient Macedonian tomb of Eordaia (Greek: Μακεδονικός τάφος Σπηλιάς) is located in Spilia along this road. The architectural form shows the tomb and monument to be in the same category as tombs of Philip II, Vergina, and Leukadia.
