= Balakros (son of Amyntas) =

Ancient Macedonian commander

Balakros (Ancient Greek: Bάλακρoς), son of Amyntas, was a military commander of ancient Macedonia under Alexander the Great. He led the allied Greek infantry in Alexander's army when Antigonus I Monophthalmus was appointed satrap of Phrygia in 334 BCE.

After the occupation of Egypt in 331 BCE, he was one of the generals left behind in that country with a part of the army. Command of the Greek infantry was given to Canalus.
