= Mesopotamo, Kozani =

Mesopotamo
- Settlement
- Location within Greece
- Coordinates: 40°13′41″N 21°31′19″E
- Country: Greece
- Geographic region: Macedonia
- Administrative region: Western Macedonia
- Regional unit: Kozani
- Municipality: Voio
- Municipal unit: Siatista
- Community: Mikrokastro
- Time zone: UTC+2 (EET)
  - Summer (DST): UTC+3 (EEST)
- Vehicle registration: ΚΖ

Mesopotamo (Greek: Μεσοπόταμο, before 1927: Γιάγκοβα – Giagkova), was a village in Kozani Regional Unit, Macedonia, Greece. It was part of the community of Mikrokastro.

Giagkova was populated by Greek speaking Muslim Vallahades. The 1920 Greek census recorded 143 people in the village, and 150 inhabitants (35 families) were Muslim in 1923. Following the Greek–Turkish population exchange, Greek refugee families in Giagkova were from Pontus (36) in 1926. The 1928 Greek census recorded 124 village inhabitants. In 1928, the refugee families numbered 35 (126 people). The village was abolished on 16 October 1940.
