= Theodoros Natsinas =

Greek teacher (1872–1949)

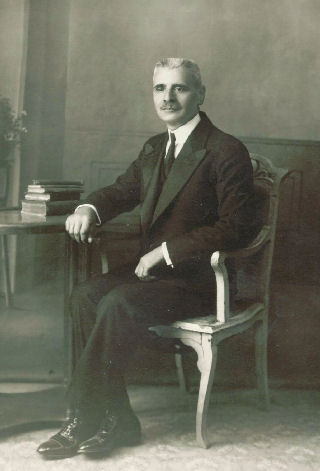
Photo portrait of Theodoros Natsinas

Theodoros Natsinas (Greek: Θεόδωρος Νάτσινας; 8 July 1872 - 2 February 1949) was a Greek teacher. He was born in Siatista (Greek: Σιάτιστα), then part of the Ottoman Empire, now in Greece.

== Career ==
He studied Physics and Mathematics at the University of Athens, where he received his degree. After the completion of his studies in 1898, he taught at secondary schools in Argos and Spetses. In 1899, the University of Athens proposed to the Greek Government that he should be posted as a teacher at Kayseri in Turkey on a "national" mission to support the local Greek population. From 1903 to 1907 he taught at Constantinople.

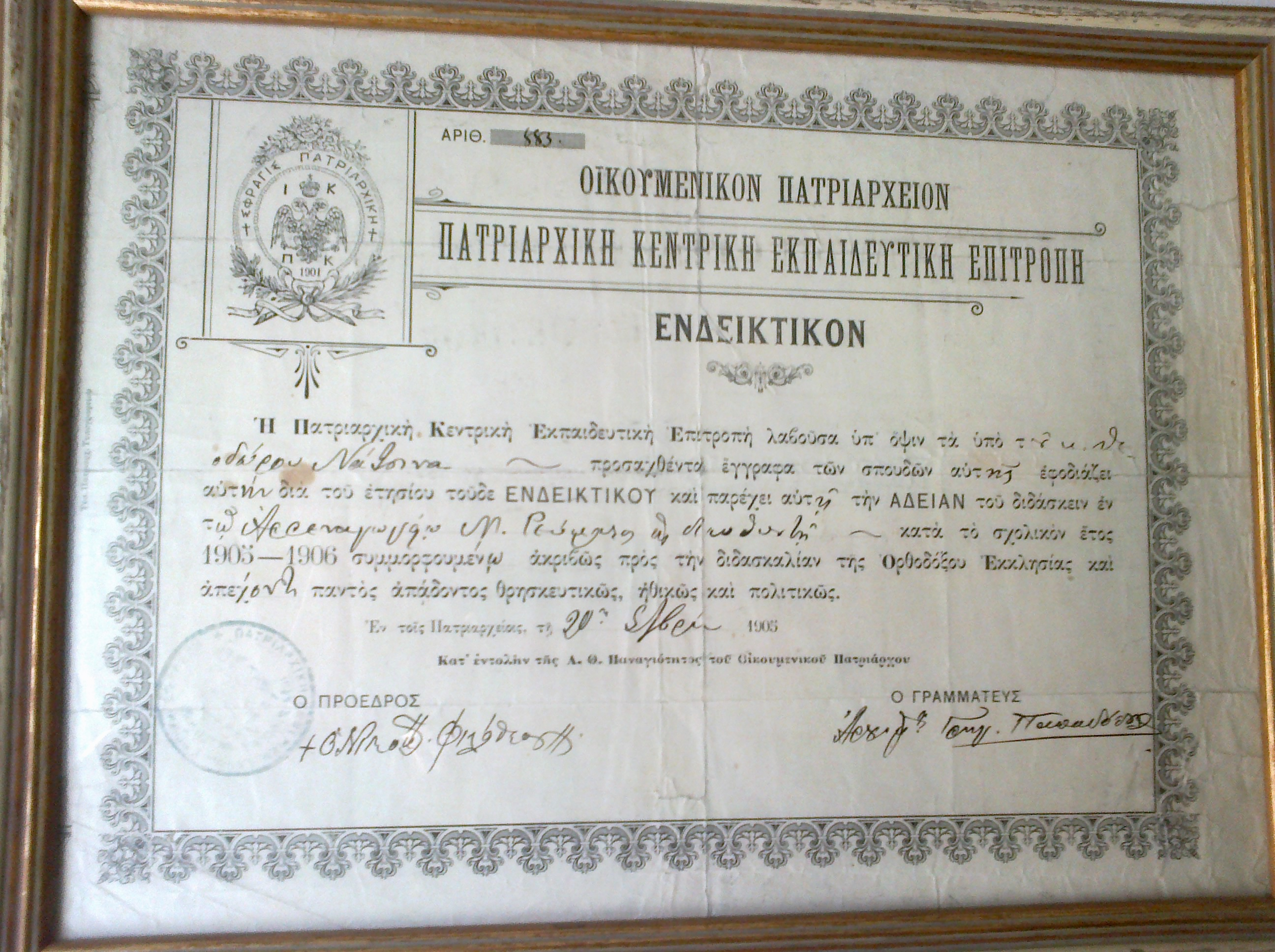
Certification by the Ecumenical Patriarchate of Constantinople, 1905

At 1907 he served as director of a school in Siatista and took part in the Greek Struggle for Macedonia. He was arrested by the Ottoman authorities and taken to nearby city of Lapsista in West Macedonia. He was released after the intervention of the Greek Bishop of Sisanion and Siatista.

In the interwar years, after West Macedonia became part of Greece, he taught in Kozani, founded the first Agricultural Cooperative there, and helped to set up the first Scouts team in West Macedonia. In 1918 he was appointed general Superintendent of Secondary Education of Greece.

In politics he was a supporter of the Liberal Party of Eleftherios Venizelos.

== Founding a school in Thessaloniki ==
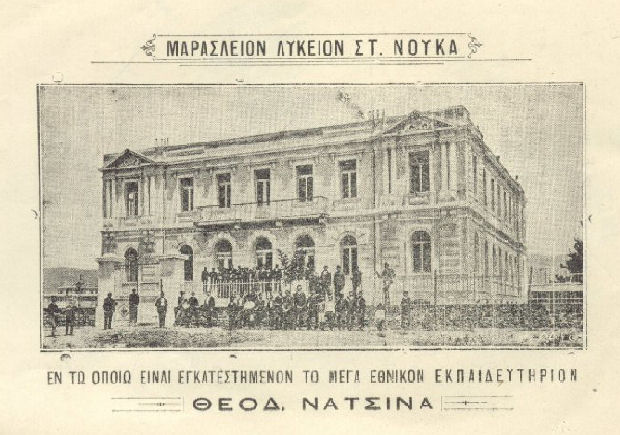
Maraslion building of Thessaloniki, where the Theodoros Natsinas School was established.

After 1921 he worked in Thessaloniki. Initially, together with a partner, G. Karantanis, they took over the management of a school established by Stefanos Noukas (the Marasleia School). At first, the school was known as the Natsinas - Karantanis School, but, subsequently, after the two partners split, the school was renamed the Theodoros Natsinas School.

He was one of the founding members of the Society for Macedonian Studies.

== Personal life ==
He had one daughter and three sons: Sultana Natsina, the Lieutenant General Alexandros Natsinas, the creator and first Director (1953–1963) of the Greek Central Intelligence Service, the politician Stefanos Natsinas, and Leandros Natsinas who studied civil engineering at Ghent, Belgium.

He is the author of the book "Macedonian Itinerant Merchants in the Countries of Austria-Hungary" (first edition 1939).

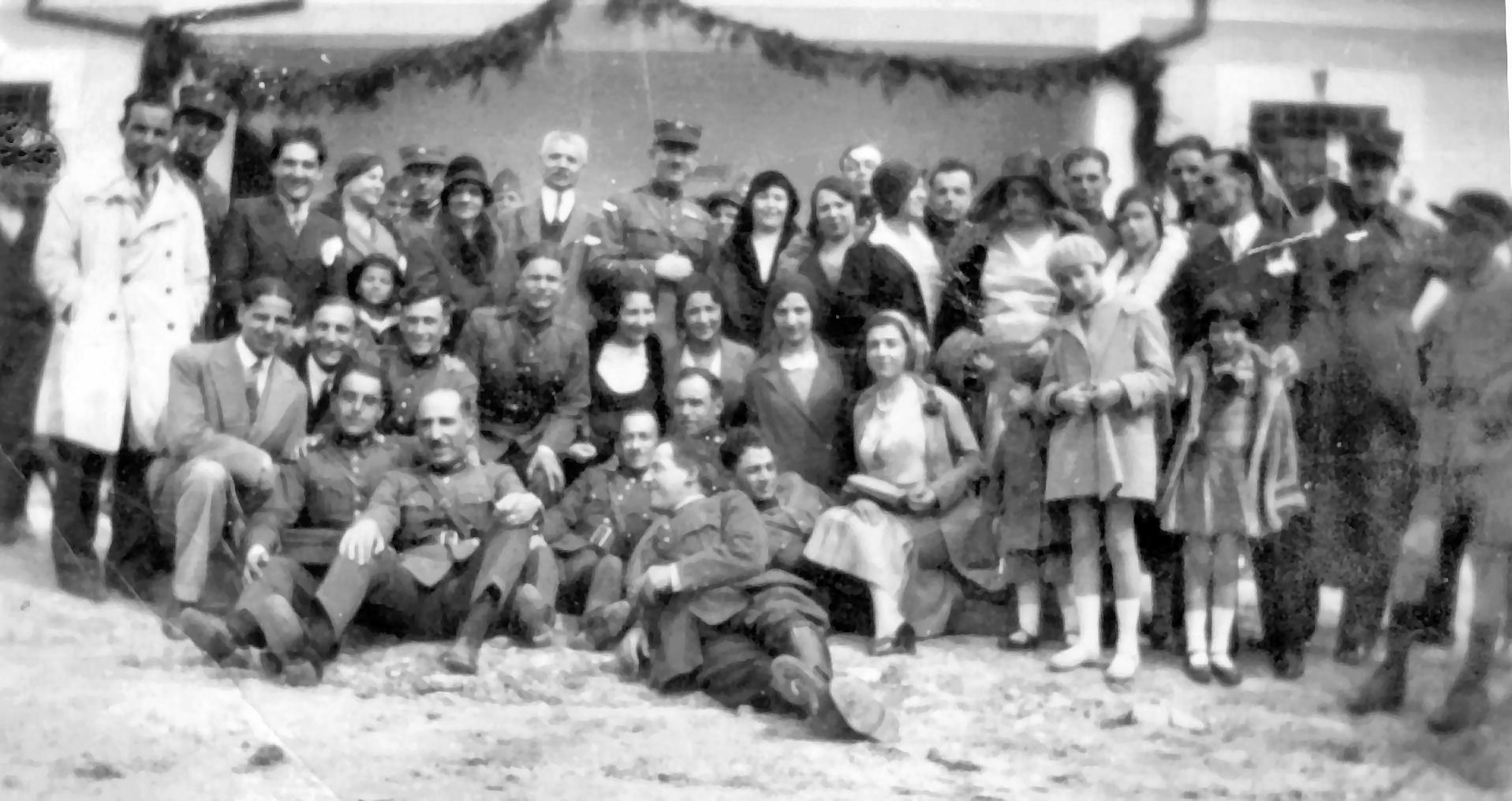
Teachers and graduates of Theodoros Natsinas College in Thessaloniki, Macedonia, Greece.

The municipality of Thessaloniki honored him by naming a city street after him.
