= Stefanos Natsinas =

Greek politician (1910–1976)

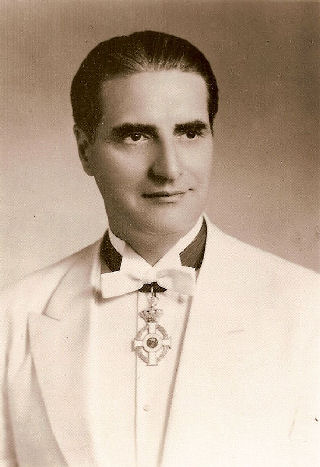
Stefanos Natsinas, upon receiving Decoration.

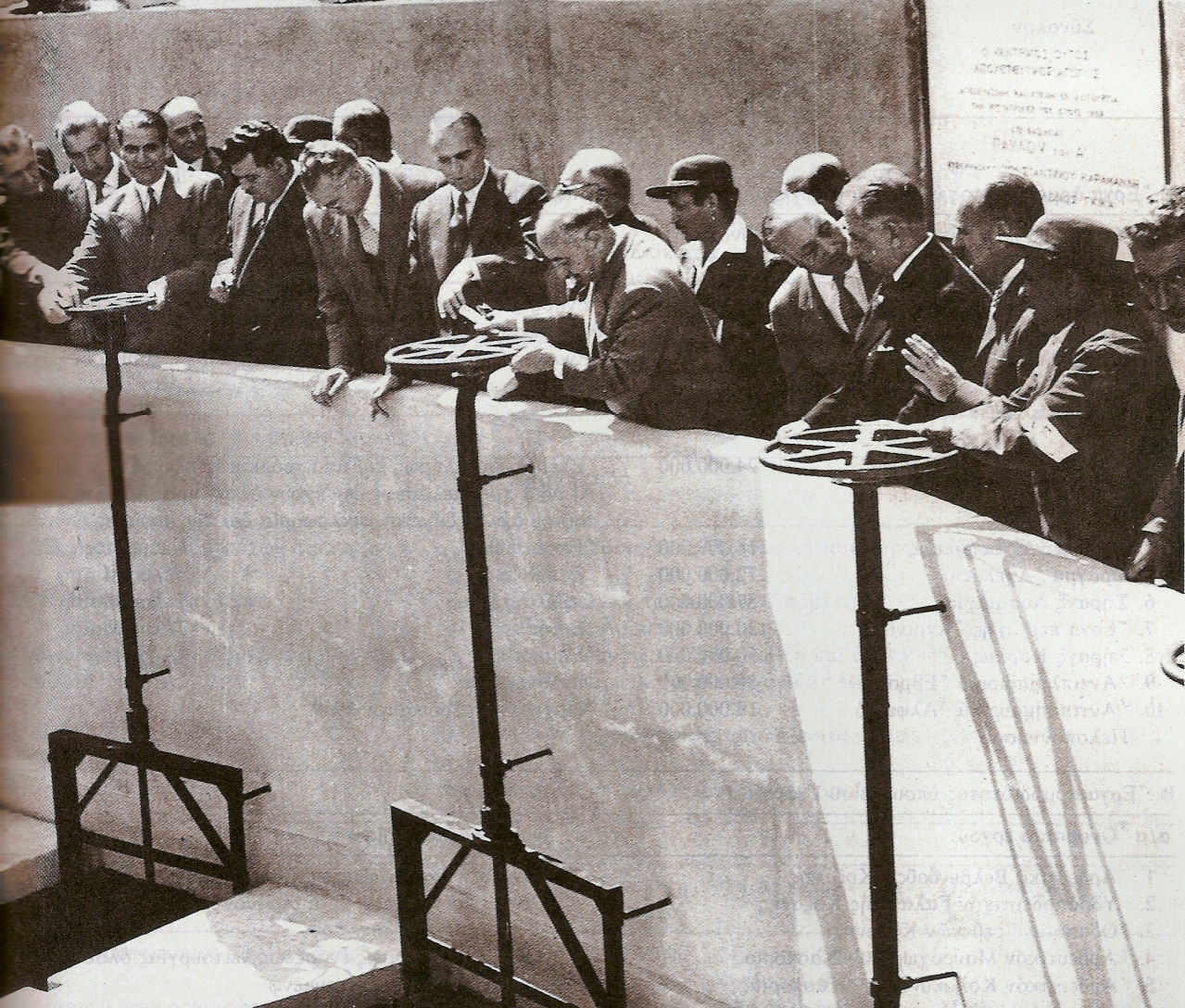
Opening of Pipeline at Keratsini. Konstantine Karamanlis with Stefanos Natsinas visiting the Central Market of Athens. Konstantinos Karamanlis at center wheel. Stefanos Natsinas at left wheel.

Stefanos Natsinas (Greek: Στέφανος Νάτσινας) (1910–1976) was a former Greek politician.

Born in Constantinople, he grew up in Thessaloniki, Greece. He was the son of Theodoros Natsinas (Greek: Θεόδωρος Νάτσινας), Inspector General of Middle Education in Greece.

He studied law at the University of Thessaloniki and practiced his profession until 29 October 1961 when he was elected, (while being for the first time candidate), as a Kozani MP of the Greek Parliament for National Radical Union of Konstantinos Karamanlis.

He was elected twice as MP and also served as prefect of Euboea (Greek: Εύβοια), the second largest of the Greek Aegean Islands and the second largest Greek island overall in area and population, after Crete.

== Serving in Ministry of Public Works ==
He served as a General Secretary for Greek Ministry of Public Works at an era Greece was having under construction many expansions of country's infrastructure.

(Middle picture at the Opening of a new Pipeline at Keratsini, with Prime Minister Konstantinos Karamanlis).

== Serving in Ministry of Commerce ==
Later he served also as a General Secretary for Greek Ministry of Commerce.

(At 3rd picture visiting the Central Market of Athens with Prime Minister Konstantinos Karamanlis).
