= Alexandros Rosios =

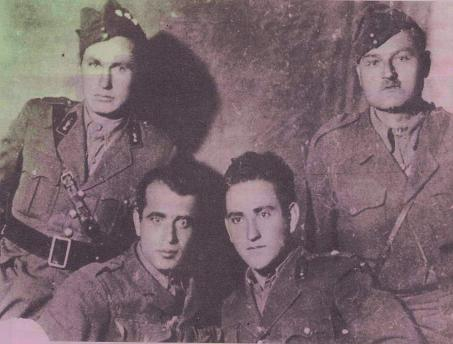
- Greek guerrilla commanders. Left to right: G. Argyrakos, M. Zygouras ("Palaiologos"), A. Rosios ("Ypsilantis"), I. Rounis ("Barbalias")
- Born: 1917; Siatista, Kozani Prefecture
- Died: 30 August 2005 (aged 87–88)
- Education: Aristotle University of Thessaloniki

Alexandros Rosios (Greek: Αλέξανδρος Ρόσιος, 1917 — 30 August 2005), also known by the nom de guerre Ypsilantis (Υψηλάντης), was a member of the Greek Communist Party (KKE) and officer of the Greek People's Liberation Army (ELAS), and later the Democratic Army of Greece (DSE). On the night of 30 March 1946, he led the attack on the Greek Gendarmerie station in Litochoro, an event traditionally regarded as the starting point of the Greek Civil War.

== Life ==
He was born in Siatista, Kozani Prefecture, in 1917, the son of a schoolteacher. He graduated in philosophy from the Aristotle University of Thessaloniki, and also attended the School of Reserve Infantry Officers in Syros. In 1940–1941, he fought in the Greco-Italian War as a lieutenant in the Greek Army.

After the occupation of Greece by the Nazis in 1941, Rosios joined the left—wing National Liberation Front (EAM), and its military branch, the Greek People's Liberation Army (ELAS). He played an active role in both the Greek Resistance against the Nazis, and the subsequent civil war. His attack on the Gendarmerie station in Litochoro (where his group of guerrillas killed 12 gendarmes and 2 civilians) is traditionally regarded as the starting point of the Greek Civil War.

After the communist defeat in the civil war, Rosios fled to the communist countries of the Eastern Bloc. During the 1950s he was a prominent member of KKE's exiled leadership and played an active role in ousting Nikos Zachariadis from power. Later however, he fell out with the leadership of Kostas Koligiannis, and in 1976, he returned to Greece and joined PASOK. In the government of Andreas Papandreou, he was appointed prefect of Aetolia-Acarnania.

He died in 2005.
