= Dafnero =

- Settlement
- Location within Greece
- Coordinates: 40°10′47″N 21°35′28″E
- Country: Greece
- Geographic region: Macedonia
- Administrative region: Western Macedonia
- Regional unit: Kozani
- Municipality: Voio
- Municipal unit: Siatista
- Community: Palaiokastro

Population (2021)
  - Total: 54
- Time zone: UTC+2 (EET)
  - Summer (DST): UTC+3 (EEST)

Dafnero (Greek: Δαφνερό, before 1927: Βάιπες – Vaipes), is a village in Kozani regional unit, Greece. It is part of the municipal unit Siatista of the municipality of Voio. The 2011 census reported a population of 72.

Vaipes was populated by Greek speaking Muslim Vallahades. The 1920 Greek census recorded 64 people in the village. Following the Greek–Turkish population exchange, Greek refugee families in Vaipes were from Pontus (23) in 1926. The 1928 Greek census recorded 138 village inhabitants. In 1928, the refugee families numbered 23 (83 people).
