= Paleontological Museum of Siatista =

Paleontological Collection of Siatista
- Παλαιοντολογική Συλλογή Σιάτιστας
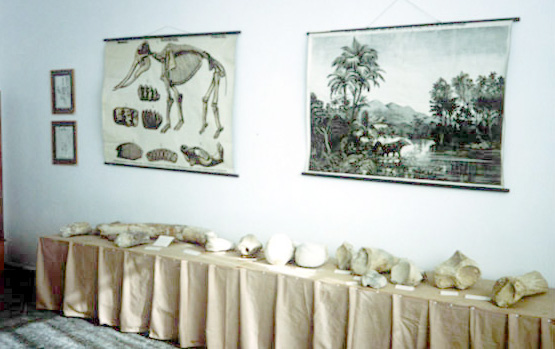
- Collection parts of a rhinoceros and of a horse
- Established: 1902
- Location: Siatista, Greece
- Coordinates: 40.26128270812103°N 21.55097433910378°E
- Type: History museum
- Founder: Diocese of Siatista

The Paleontological Collection of Siatista (Greek: Παλαιοντολογική Συλλογή Σιάτιστας) is a museum in the town of Siatista in West Macedonia, Greece. The museum is temporarily housed in a room in the Tsipos Boarding School until the repairs to the Trabadzis High School have been completed.

== Collection ==
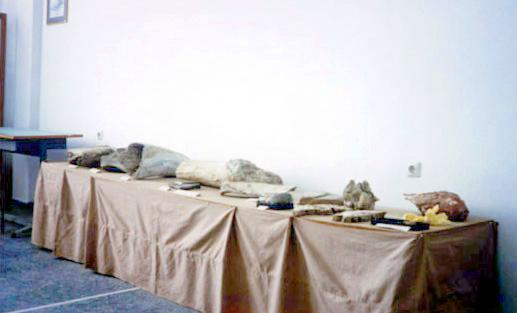
Collection parts of a mammoth

It consists of bones of mammals from the Pleistocene epoch of the Coenozoic era and shells of elasmobranchii and gastropods. The collection was born in 1902, when a fossilised tusk was found in the village of Polylakko in the Aliakmon valley. Further finds were made in the years which followed and together they made up the Siatista Palaeontological Collection.

Today it consists of parts of the humerus, thigh, tusk, shin, and shoulder-blade of a mammoth which lived 100,000 years ago, parts of the humerus, shin, and jaw of a rhinoceros and of the lower jaw of a younger rhinoceros, which lived 75,000 years ago, teeth, metatarsals, and talus of a horse of the species antonius, which lived 300,000–400,000 years ago, part of the pelvis and horns of a deer 100,000–400,000 years old, the talus, horntip, and lower part of the humerus of a bovine (75,000 years old), and various shells and rocks.
