= Theodoros Manousis =

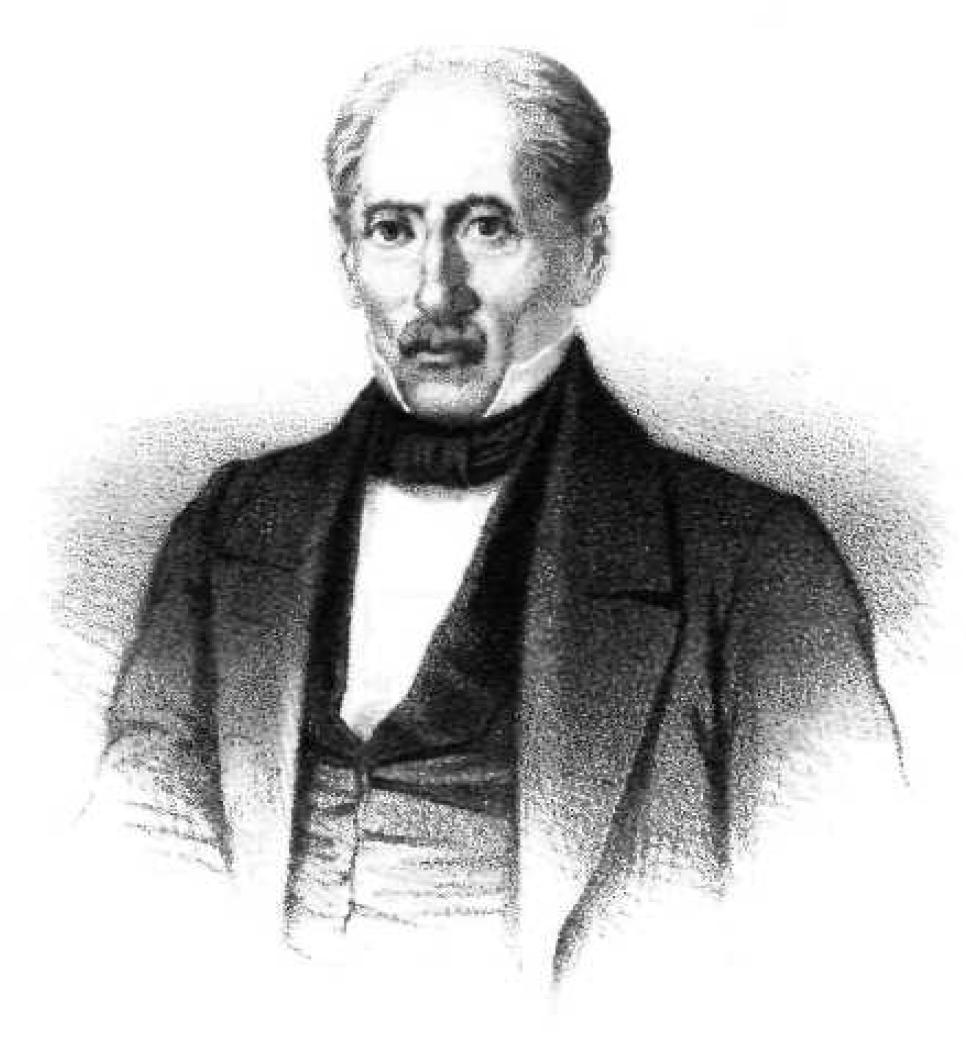
- Theodoros Manousis in a magazine of 1863
- Born: 1793; Siatista, Ottoman Empire
- Died: 1858 (aged 64–65); Athens, Kingdom of Greece
- Education: Leipzig University, University of Göttingen
- Occupations: University professor, historian, judge, benefactor, archaeologist
- Employer: University of Athens (1840–1858)

Signature
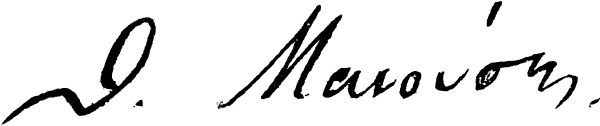

Theodoros Manousis (Greek: Θεόδωρος Μανούσης; 1793–1858) was a Greek historian, judge, benefactor, archaeologist and the first professor of history of the University of Athens.

== Biography ==
Manousis was born in 1793 in Siatista, then Ottoman Empire (now Greece). His father was a rich merchant and sent him study in the Leipzig University and later in the University of Göttingen. He met with Theoklitos Farmakidis and with him he was briefly the director of the Hermes o Logios. He was imprisoned for a while by the Austrian authorities for revolutionary activities. He continued his studies in 1828 in Italy in history and archaeology, and returned to Greece in 1830. Initially he served as a judge in the Supreme Civil and Criminal Court of Greece and as royal commissioner of the Church of Greece (1835-1843). From the first year the foundation of the University of Athens, and for about twenty years (1840-1858), he was appointed as a professor teaching history. He was elected rector in the academic year 1845-1846, while in the academic year 1849-1850 he was dean of the Philosophical School.

He died in 1858 in Athens, at the age of 65, inheriting all his fortune at charities and at the University of Athens which established the Manousios Library in his hometown, Siatista, housing more than 5.000 books.
