= Ecclesiastical Museum of Siatista =

- Εκκλησιαστικό Μουσείο Σιάτιστας
- Established: 2001
- Location: Siatista, Greece
- Coordinates: 40.26171707053189°N 21.550846809503103°E
- Type: Art museum
- Website: via odysseus.culture.gr

The Ecclesiastical Museum of Siatista (Greek: Εκκλησιαστικό Μουσείο Σιάτιστας) is a museum in the town of Siatista, in the Kozani Prefecture, Greece.

== Description ==
Opened in 2001, the Ecclesiastical Museum is located on the 1st floor of a building in the precinct of the Metropolitan Palace of Siatista. The exhibits include icons, wood carvings, small objects, books, vestments which have been collected from the temples and monasteries of the area.
