= Botanical Museum of the Mountaineering Association (Siatista) =

Botanical Museum of the Mountaineering Association of Siatista
- Βοτανικό Μουσείο του Ορειβατικού Συλλόγου Σιάτιστας
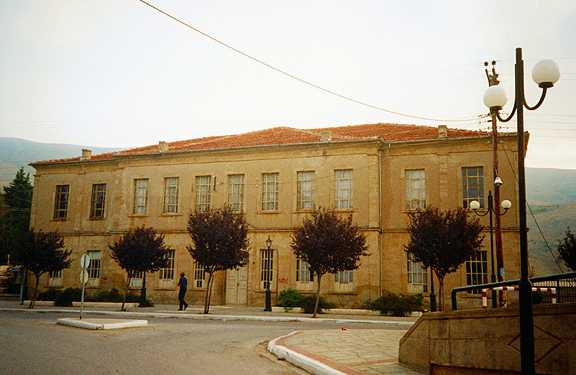
- Outside view of Trabadzis Gymnasium
- Established: 1989
- Location: Siatista, Greece
- Coordinates: 40.26137116137383°N 21.550972873327716°E
- Type: Natural museum
- Collection size: 1200+

The Botanical Museum of the Mountaineering Association of Siatista (Greek: Βοτανικό Μουσείο του Ορειβατικού Συλλόγου Σιάτιστας) is a Natural museum located in the northern Greek city of Siatista, Greece.

== Description ==
The museum was opened in 1989 by the Mountaineering Association to spotlight the wealth and variety of vegetal and animal life in the Vourinos Range of West Macedonia, Greece. The aim was to educate people in environmental awareness and to emphasise the need to protect the Siatista area from activities that lead to environmental decline.

The Museum has been temporarily transferred to three rooms in the Tsipos Boarding School until completion of the restoration and repair work being carried out in its usual premises, the Trabadzis Gymnasium, which was damaged by an earthquake.

There are 700 flowers and plants displayed at the Museum (in the form of photographs and dried plants), 500 rare butterflies, and a number of reptiles from the Messianos valley and the Vourinos area in general.

== Image Gallery ==
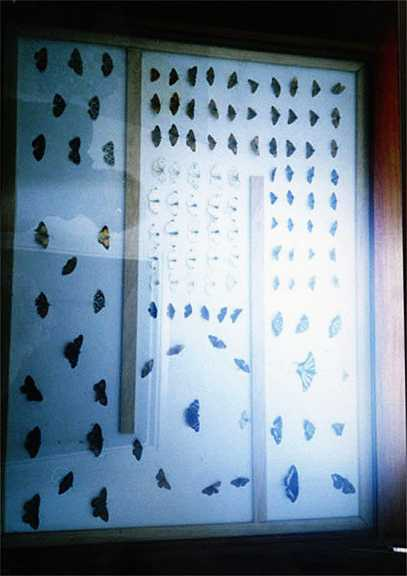
Display of Butterfly collection

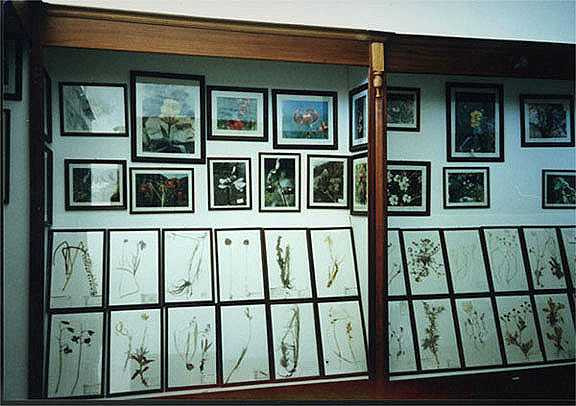
Display of rare flowers

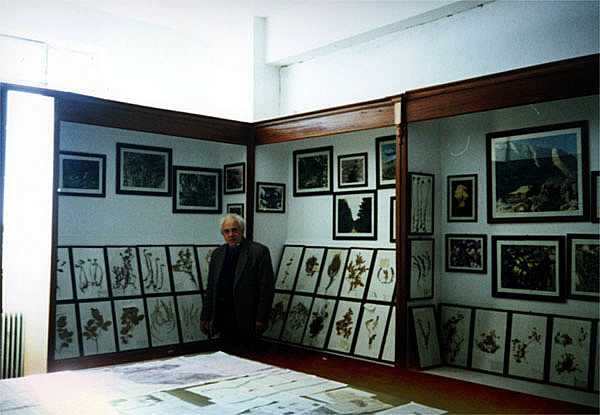
Show-case with reptiles
