= Palaiokastro, Kozani =

Village in Greece

Palaiokastro Παλαιόκαστρο
- Community
- Location within Greece
- Coordinates: 40°12.1725′N 21°36.06′E
- Country: Greece
- Administrative region: Western Macedonia
- Regional unit: Kozani
- Municipality: Voio
- Municipal unit: Siatista

Area
  - Community: 47.525 km^{2} (18.350 sq mi)
- Elevation: 857 m (2,812 ft)

Population (2021)
  - Community: 220
  - Density: 4.6/km^{2} (12/sq mi)
- Time zone: UTC+2 (EET)
  - Summer (DST): UTC+3 (EEST)
- Postal code: 503 00
- Area code: +30-2465
- Vehicle registration: ΚΖ

Palaiokastro (Greek: Παλαιόκαστρο) is a village and a community of the Voio municipality. Before the 2011 local government reform it was part of the municipality of Siatista, of which it was a municipal district. The 2021 census recorded 220 inhabitants in the community of Palaiokastro. The community of Palaiokastro covers an area of 47.525 km^{2}.

== Administrative division ==
The community of Palaiokastro consists of two separate settlements:

- Dafnero (population 54 in 2021)
- Palaiokastro (population 166)

== History ==
The first references of Paleokastro, are at year 1460 AD when, after the fall of Constantinople, hundreds inhabitants of the region took refuge in the mountains to hide from the Ottomans.

At the end of the 19th century, Paleokastro was a village in the Venci district of the Ottoman Empire. In the Church of Saint John the Forerunner, there are two inscriptions: one in the sanctuary from September 1834 mentioning Metropolitan Gerasim Grevenski, and another above the main entrance from October 1848 mentioning Metropolitan Ioanniki Grevenski. The Church of Saint Nicholas on Mount Glass was built on the foundations of an older church.

According to the statistics of Vasil Kanchov in 1900, Paleokastro was a village in Kozani with 217 Christian Greek inhabitants and 215 Muslim Greek inhabitants, yet the ethnic identity of the village is recorded as purely Greek. According to Dimitar Mishev, the secretary of the Bulgarian Exarchate, in 1905 there were 243 Christian Greeks in Paleokastro ("Macedonia and Its Christian Population").

According to the statistics of the Greek consulate in Elasona from 1904, Paleokastro is designated as a village in Grevenska kaza with 470 Hellenophone Greek inhabitants.

Dimitar Mishev, the secretary of the Bulgarian Exarchate, noted in "Macedonia and Its Christian Population" that in 1905 there were 140 Greek Christians residing in Paleoastron.

During the early 20th century, the villagers actively participated in Greek armed efforts in Macedonia.

During the Balkan War in 1912 the village entered the Greek State.

== See also ==
- List of settlements in the Kozani regional unit
