= Mikrokastro =

Mikrokastro Μικρόκαστρο
- Community
- Location within Greece
- Coordinates: 40°15.95′N 21°30.2′E
- Country: Greece
- Administrative region: Western Macedonia
- Regional unit: Kozani
- Municipality: Voio (municipality)
- Municipal unit: Siatista
- Elevation: 659 m (2,162 ft)

Population (2021)
  - Community: 368
- Time zone: UTC+2 (EET)
  - Summer (DST): UTC+3 (EEST)
- Postal code: 503 00
- Area code: +30-2465
- Vehicle registration: ΚΖ

Mikrokastro (Greek: Μικρόκαστρο, before 1927: Τσιρούσινον – Tsirousinon), is a village and a community of the Voio municipality. Before the 2011 local government reform it was part of the municipality of Siatista, of which it was a municipal district. The 2021 census recorded 368 inhabitants in the community. The community consists of the villages Mikrokastro and Mesopotamo.
