= Peristera Kraka =

Greek rebel commander during the 1878 Greek Macedonian rebellion

- Περιστέρα Κράκα
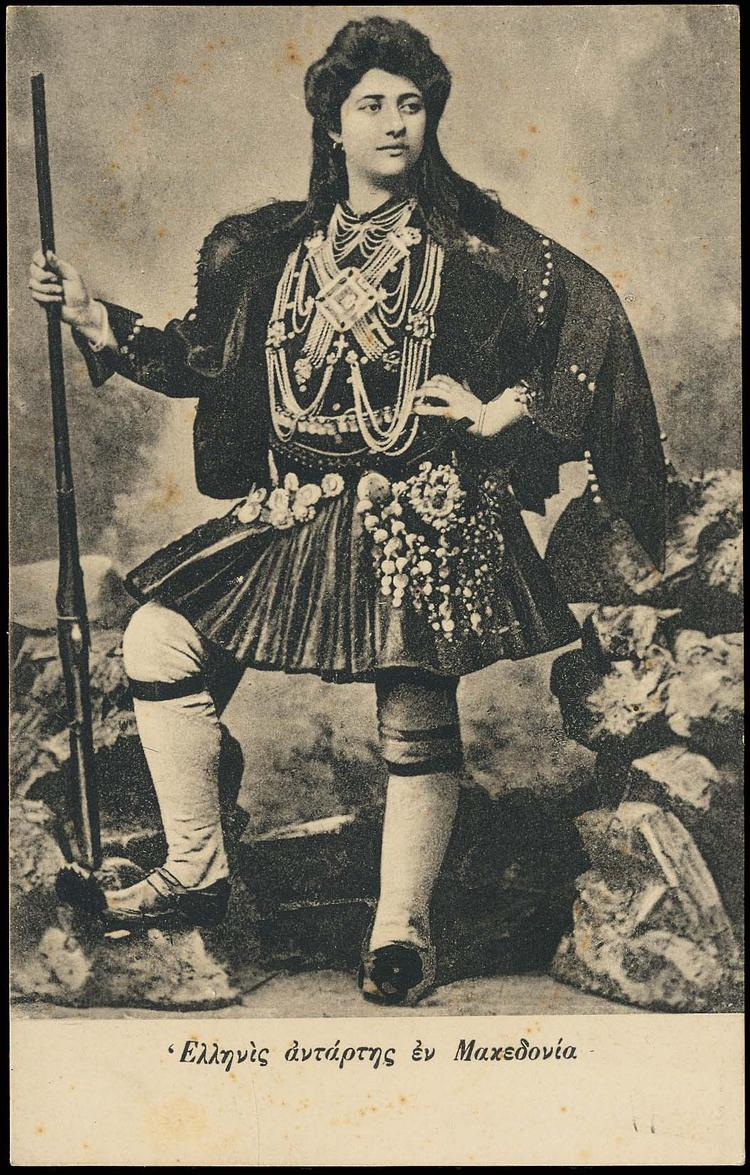
- Born: 1860; Siatista, Rumelia Eyalet, Ottoman Empire
- Died: 1938 (aged 77–78); Ampelonas, Thessaly, Kingdom of Greece

Peristera Kraka (Greek: Περιστέρα Κράκα; 1860–1938), also known by her nom-de-guerre Kapetan Spanovangelis (Greek: Καπετάν Σπανοβαγγέλης), was a Greek commander of rebel forces during the 1878 Greek Macedonian rebellion; demanding the nullification of the Treaty of San Stefano that granted much of Ottoman Macedonia to Bulgaria, and the unification of Macedonia with Greece.

== Biography ==
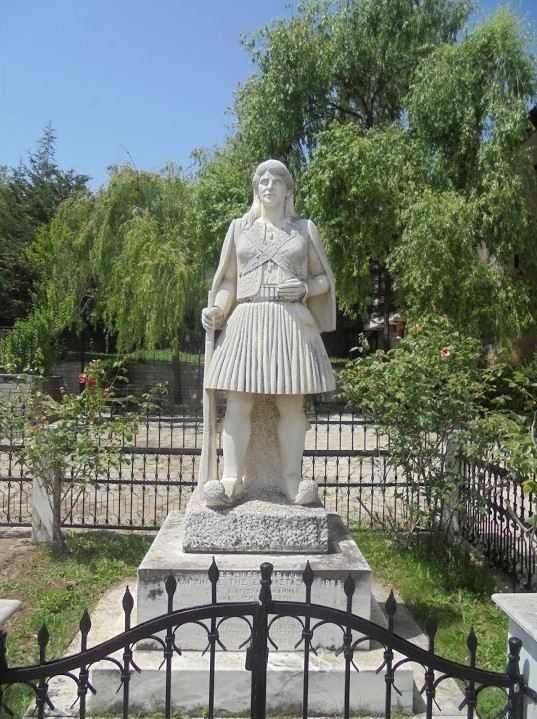
Statue of Peristera Kraka in Siatista; raised in 1990.

She was born in Siatista, Rumelia Eyalet, Ottoman Empire in 1860. Her brother Goulias Krakas was a rebel commander. When the 1878 Greek Macedonian rebellion began, she asked to join his forces, which he initially declined. One day, the Ottomans visited her to take her for interrogation, but she managed to escape dressed as a man, and went to find her brother in order to join his forces. There, she was initially treated with suspicion by her comrades, but she soon won their respect. The Ottomans managed to kill her brother; either by arresting and flaying him alive, or during a shootout between them and his group. Peristera (18 years old at the time) was then proclaimed unanimously as the new commander of the rebel group, which consisted of over 40 men, and became known as "Kapetan Spanovangelis". She fought valiantly in the broader region of Kozani and Kastoria for the next six months. She also located her brother's killers, and avenged his death. Her actions became known outside Greece, and the French newspaper Le Papillon called her, the Joan of Arc of the 19th century. She stopped her guerrilla activity and returned to Siatista when the Turks granted her amnesty; mediated by the Metropolitan of Sisanion and Siatista Agathangelos, who welcomed her in the church of Saint Demetrios. This amnesty was violated by the Turks, and Peristera was forced to leave Macedonia (which was still under Ottoman rule) and take refuge in Thessaly. She settled in Ampelonas, where she met with a comrade of hers, named Nikolaos Apostolou (or Perdikas). She married Apostolou in 1882, with whom she eventually had two daughters, named Anneta and Eleni. Apostolou was once arrested and imprisoned in Aegina; being accused of robbery. Peristera went to Athens and requested to meet with King George I, from whom she asked amnesty for her husband. According to tradition, she participated in a shooting match at the Shooting Range of Kaisariani, where she competed with the best shooters and won all of them. The King admired her shooting skills, and thus granted the requested amnesty. After 8 years of marriage, Apostolou was murdered in 1890. In the Greco-Turkish War of 1897, Peristera's house was burned down by the Turks. Around 1898, Peristera was married for a second time, to someone named Papagianopoulos; with whom she had one son, named Charilaos. Her second husband also died in 1902. Peristera lived the rest of her life in Ampelonas; devoted to raising her children. She died in 1938. In 1990, a statue was raised in her honor, at her native town of Siatista.
