= Siatista =

Town in Macedonia, Greece

Siatista Σιάτιστα
- Municipal unit
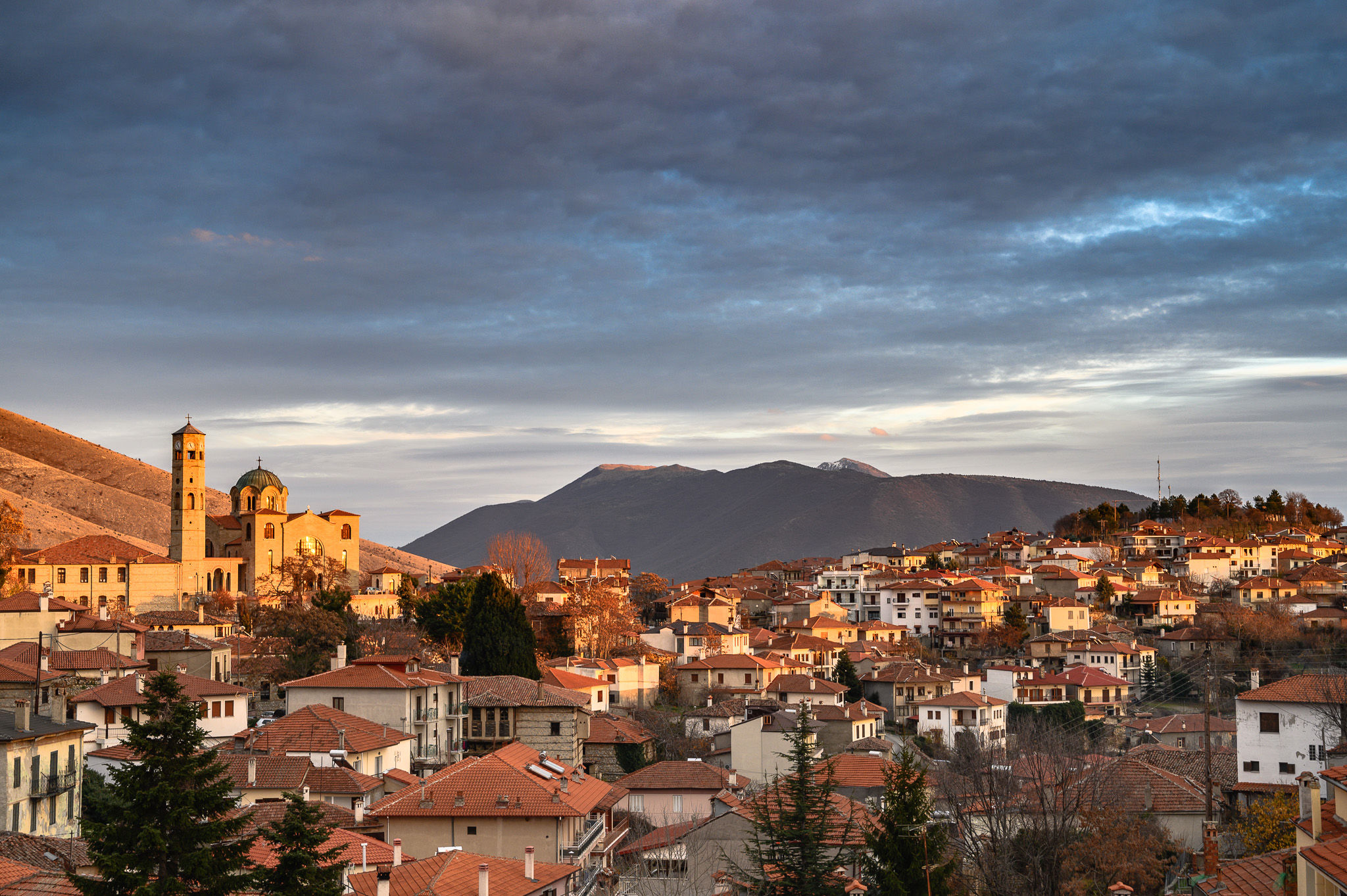
- View of Siatista

- Location within the regional unit

- Location within Greece
- Coordinates: 40°15.5′N 21°33′E
- Country: Greece
- Geographic region: Macedonia
- Administrative region: Western Macedonia
- Regional unit: Kozani
- Municipality: Voio

Area
  - Municipal unit: 158.524 km^{2} (61.206 sq mi)
  - Community: 94.426 km^{2} (36.458 sq mi)
- Elevation: 920 m (3,020 ft)

Population (2021)
  - Municipal unit: 5,645
  - Municipal unit density: 35.61/km^{2} (92.23/sq mi)
  - Community: 5,057
  - Community density: 53.56/km^{2} (138.7/sq mi)
- Time zone: UTC+2 (EET)
  - Summer (DST): UTC+3 (EEST)
- Postal code: 503 00
- Area code: +30-2465
- Vehicle registration: KZ

Siatista (Greek: Σιάτιστα) is a town and a former municipality in Kozani regional unit, Western Macedonia, Greece. Since the 2011 local government reform it is part of the municipality Voio, of which it is the seat and a municipal unit. It lies 28 kilometres (17 miles) southwest of Kozani. The municipal unit has an area of 158.524 km^{2}, the community 94.426 km^{2}. The 2021 Greek census recorded 5,057 residents in the town and 5,645 in the municipal unit. It was built on the austral slope of the Velia mountain on an (average) height of 930 metres (3,051 feet).

== Administrative division ==
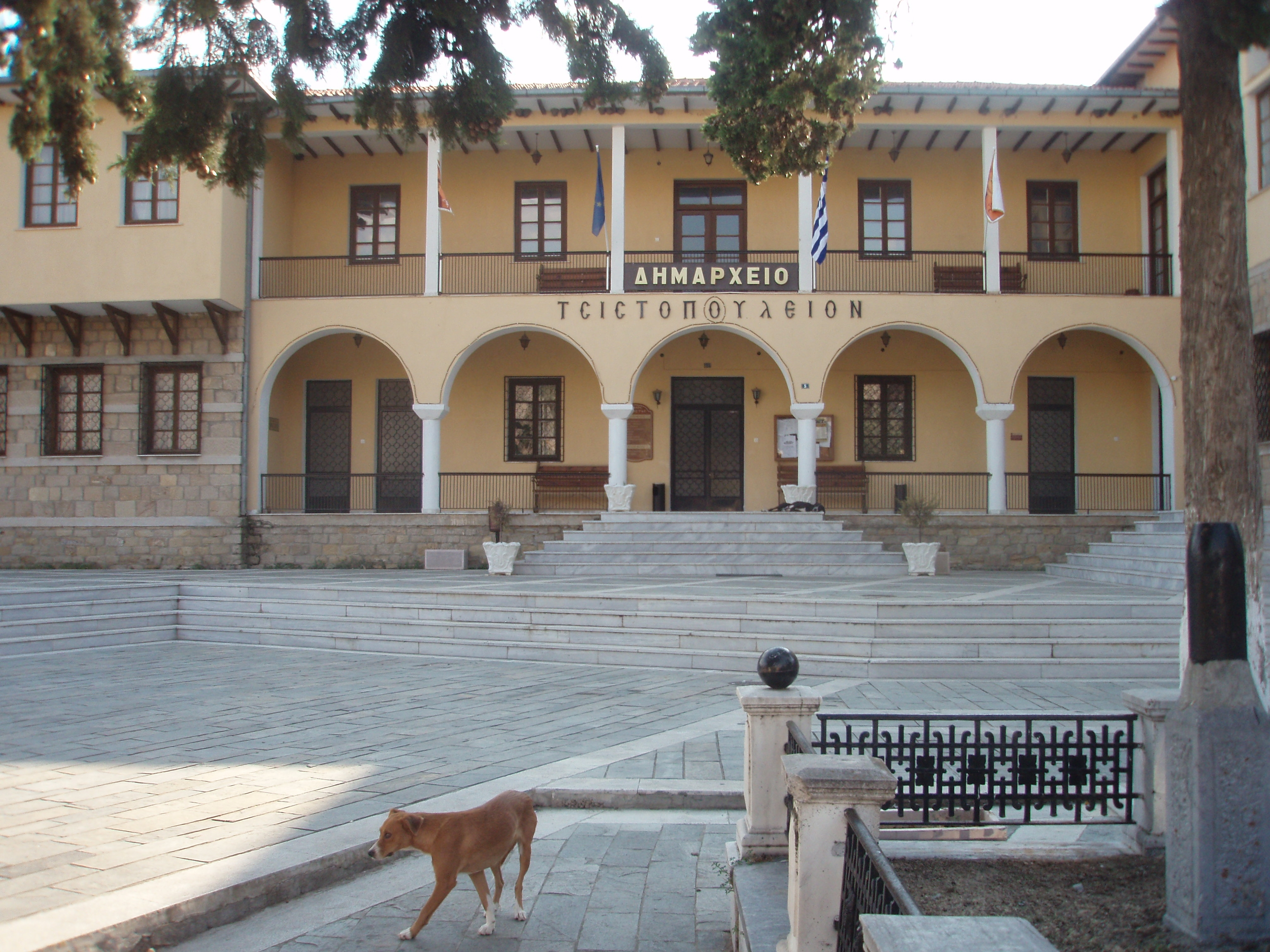
The town hall

The municipal unit of Siatista consists of the following municipal communities (populations as of 2021):

- Siatista, population 5,057
- Mikrokastro, population 368
- Palaiokastro, population 220

The municipal community of Palaiokastro comprises two settlements: Palaiokastro and Dafnero.

== History ==
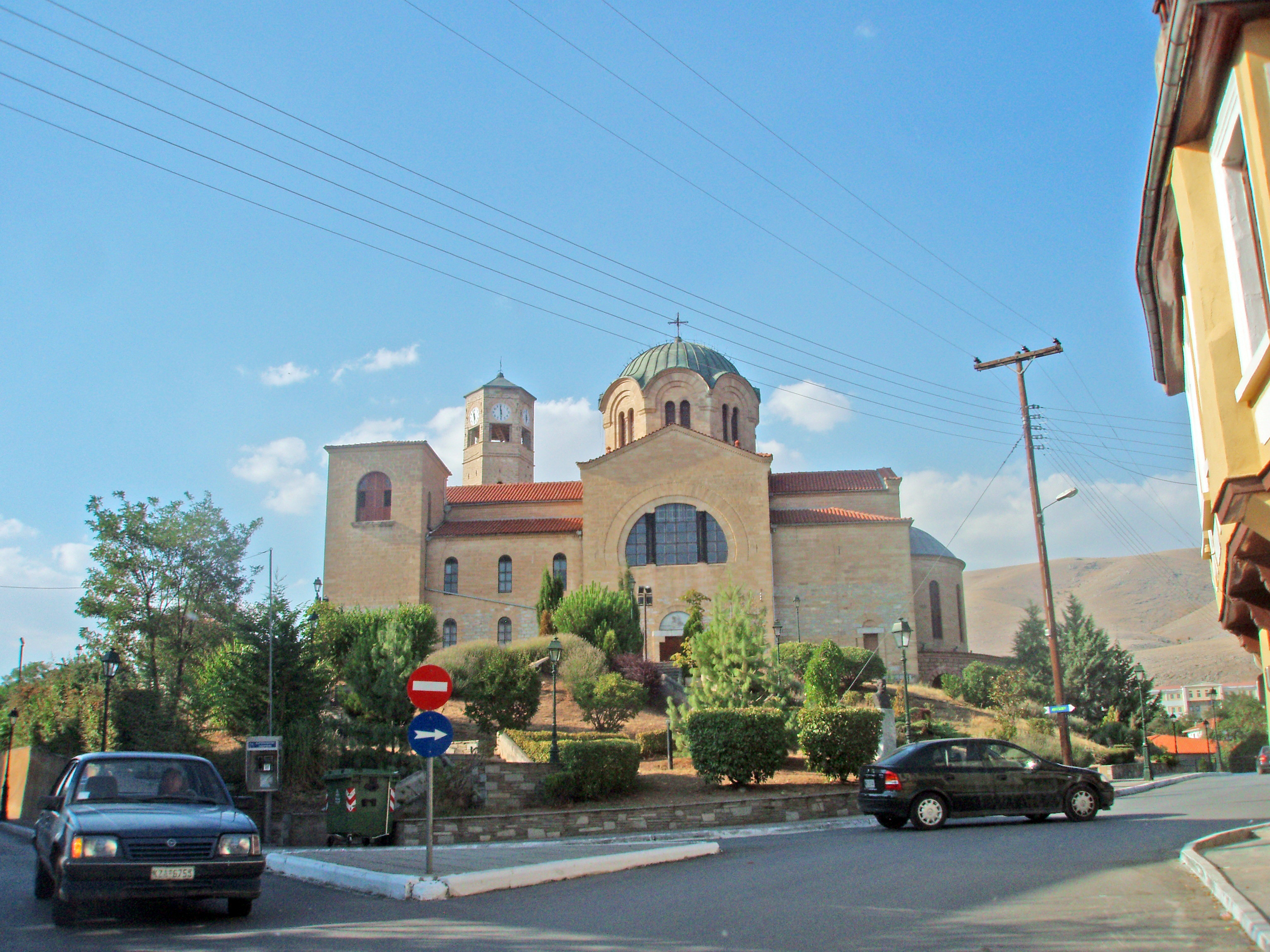
Church in Siatista

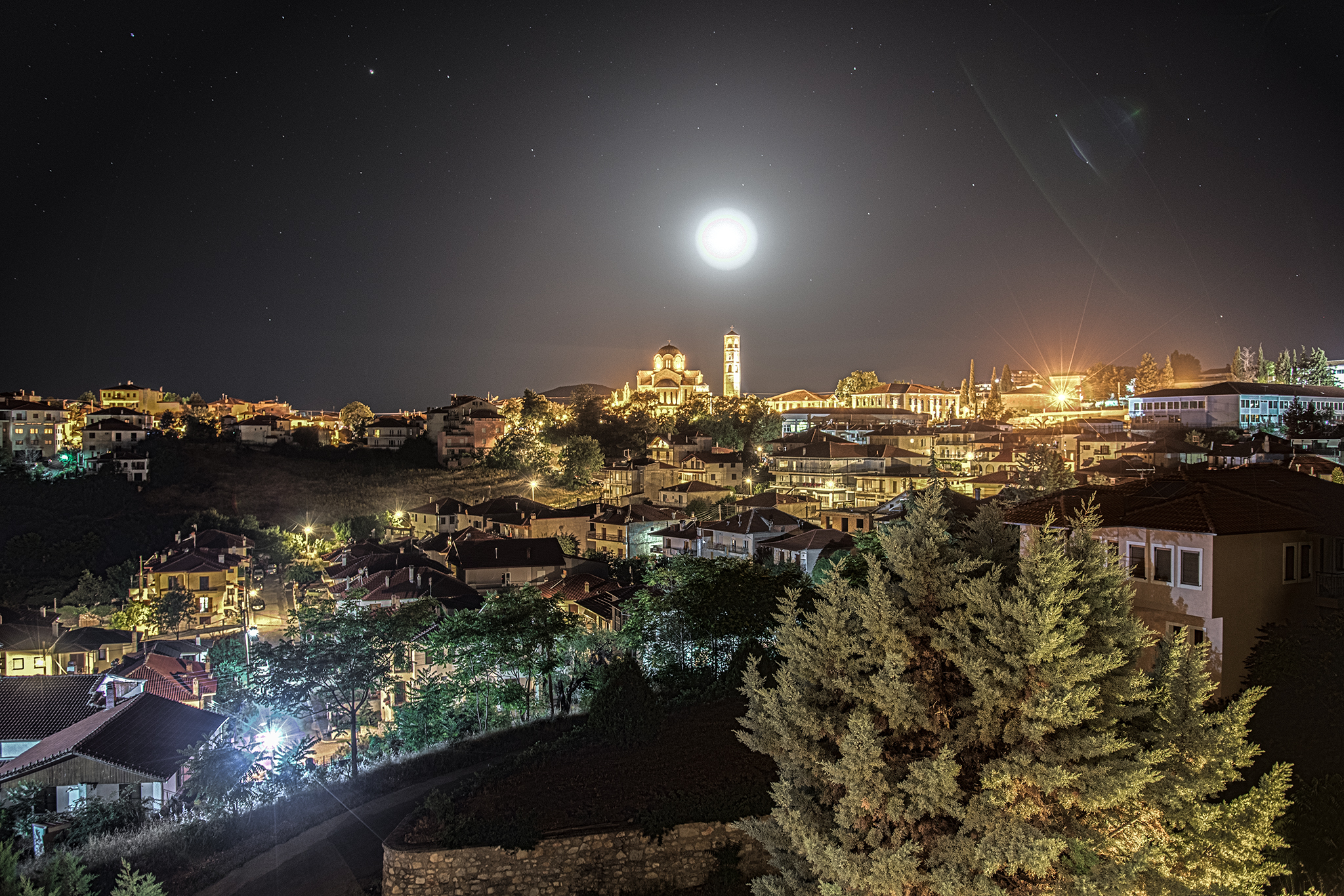
Night view

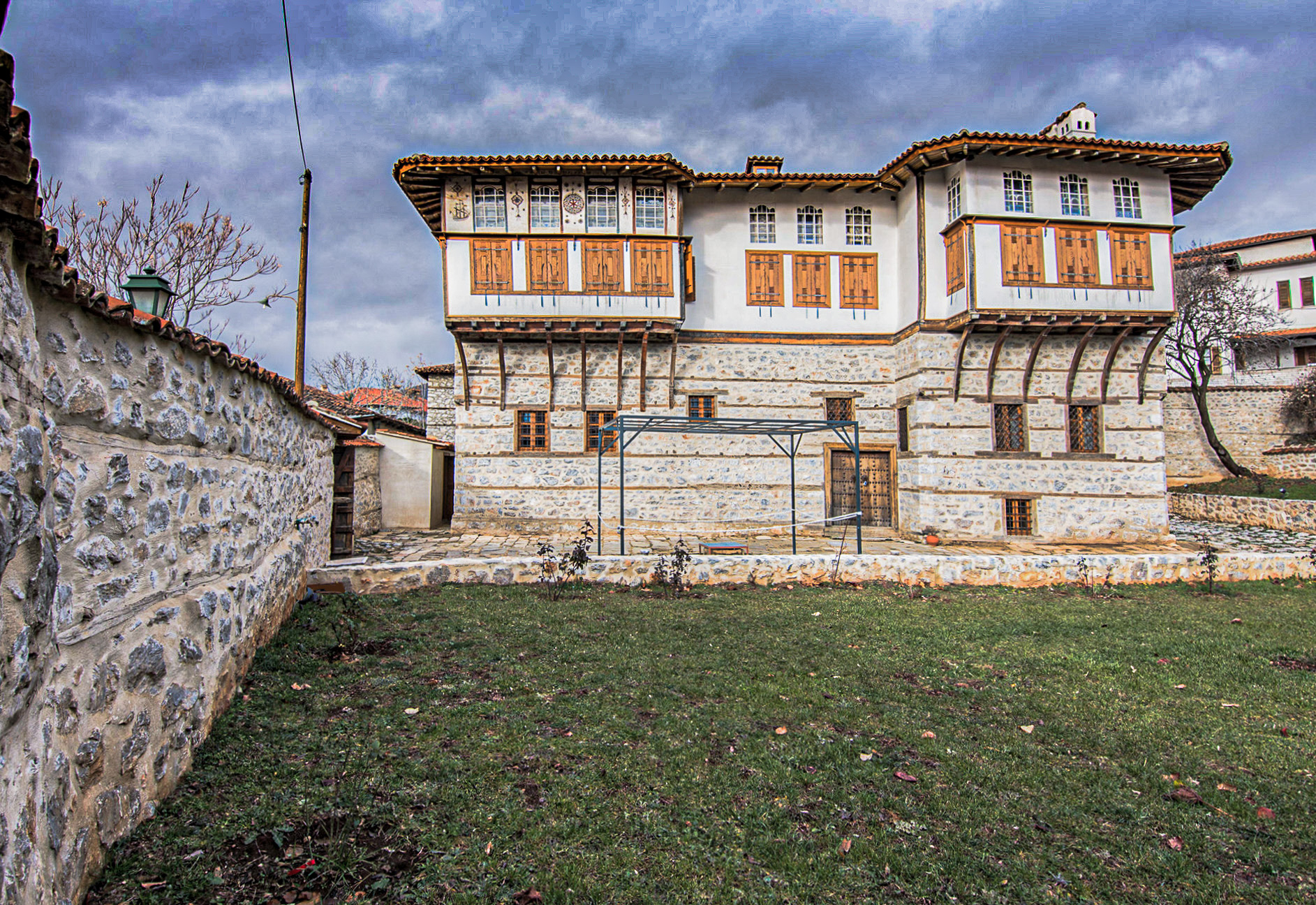
Poulkos mansion

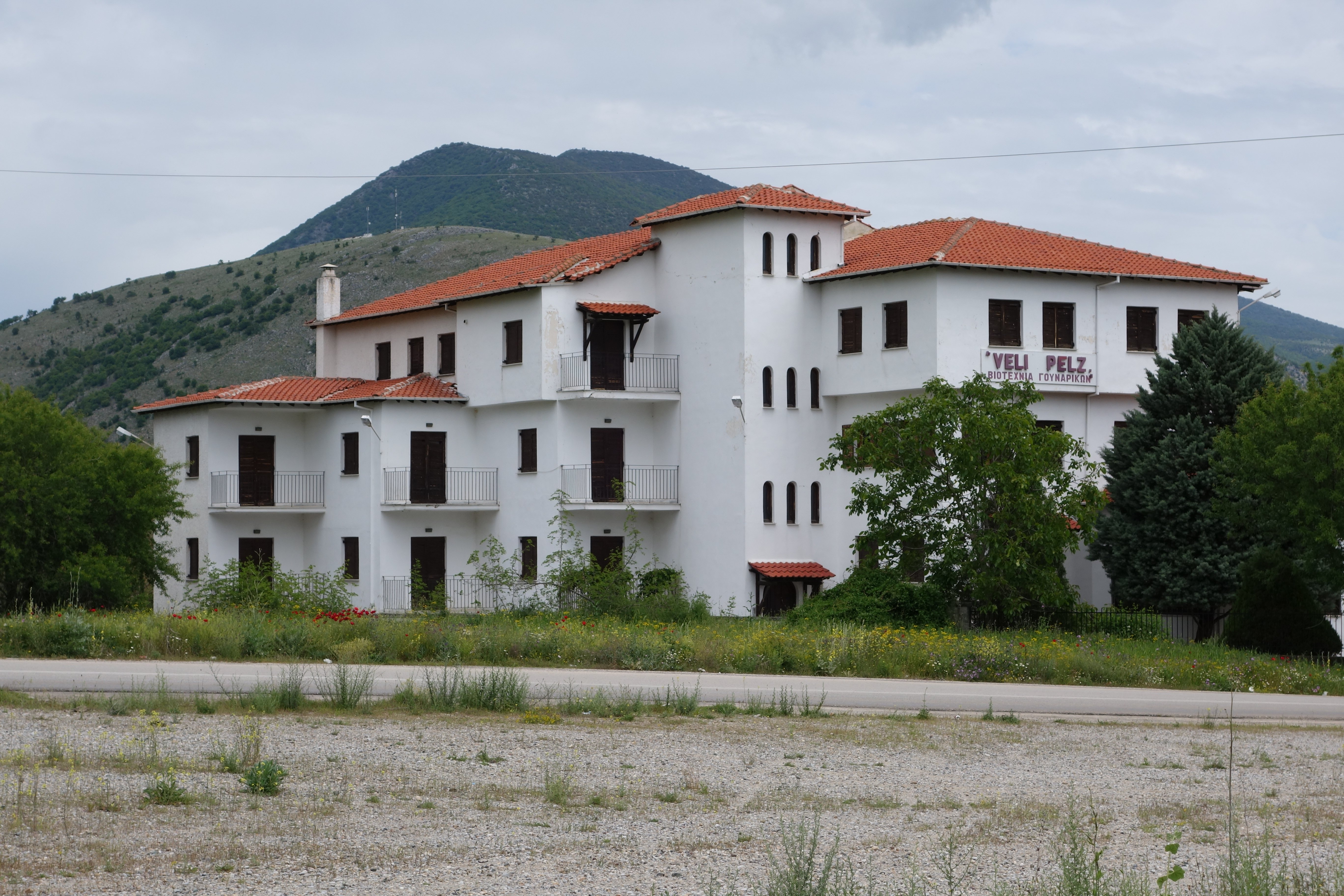
Furrier artisanship

The first name of the city was Kalyvia. This name is referenced in the archives of the Zavordas Monastery.

In 1745, the city is referenced in a formal document of Joseph, Archbishop of Ohrid. The commercial ties between Siatista and Central Europe during 17th and 18th centuries were very successful, and allowed the inhabitants to build many mansions and churches with wonderful frescos and icons.

Siatista lies in a setting where its mountains and wilderness provide a sense of solitude. As a result, many Siatistans had to become merchants to import (or export) necessary goods. Many of them found their way abroad permanently or temporarily where they distinguished themselves as able and reliable merchants. Many of them who became wealthy never returned. Those who chose to return built large thick-walled mansions with doors, decorated "ondas", stained glasses, and lively colours in the folk paintings on their walls. All of this embodies their high standard of living, a rare phenomenon for an isolated town. Many of those mansions are still in good shape and can be found in the old city.

One self-made wealthy merchant was Theodoros Dimitriou who, together with his wife Afrati, left their town at 1790 for Zagreb, then an Austrian city. He managed to earn a significant fortune by trading a variety of goods which helped them to give a proper education to their children. Of them, Dimitrios became a leading figure in the Croatian national awakening movement (then under Austro-Hungarian rule) and a national writer, poet, dramatist and political activist. Recognized as one of the most learned people of his time, he was the first who imposed the Croatian language in the local literacy, he created the National Croatian Theater in Zagreb and became famous for his political activism for the Croatian national revival through his key role in many Croatian patriotic pamphlets at the time. Demeter's award for drama which established 35 years after his death (1872) stood until nowadays and his bust decorates the yard of the Croatian National Theater in Zagreb.

In 1888 Ioannis Trampatzes, another expatriate Greek merchant in Romania, donated the funds for the Trampatzeion Gymnasium. The gymnasium housed two large libraries, the Manouseios with 5,000 books and the Roussopouleios with 2,000.

Siatista was liberated from the Ottoman Turks by the Greek army on 4 November 1912, during the First Balkan War. In March 1943, the Battle of Fardykambos was fought near the town between the Royal Italian Army and the partisans of EAM-ELAS, with the participation of many of the local inhabitants.

== Economy ==
The economy of Siatista, is predominantly anchored in the fur trade, with a long-standing tradition of fur craftsmanship. Local artisans and furriers in Siatista are renowned for their specialized skills in working with a variety of high-quality furs, including mink, fox, sable, and chinchilla. The town’s fur industry not only forms the backbone of its economic structure but also contributes significantly to the regional and national economic landscape. The meticulous artistry and entrepreneurial spirit of Siatista's furriers have established the town as a pivotal hub for the fur industry, catering to both the domestic and international luxury markets.

== Transportation ==
The A2 (Egnatia Odos) and A29 motorways, along with national roads EO15 and EO20 pass south of Siatista, near a locality described by the 1963 Ministerial Decision on the national road network as Bara (Μπάρα).

== Sports ==
Siatista is home to Makedonikos Siatista F.C., a football club with numerous appearances in the national divisions.

== Celebrations ==
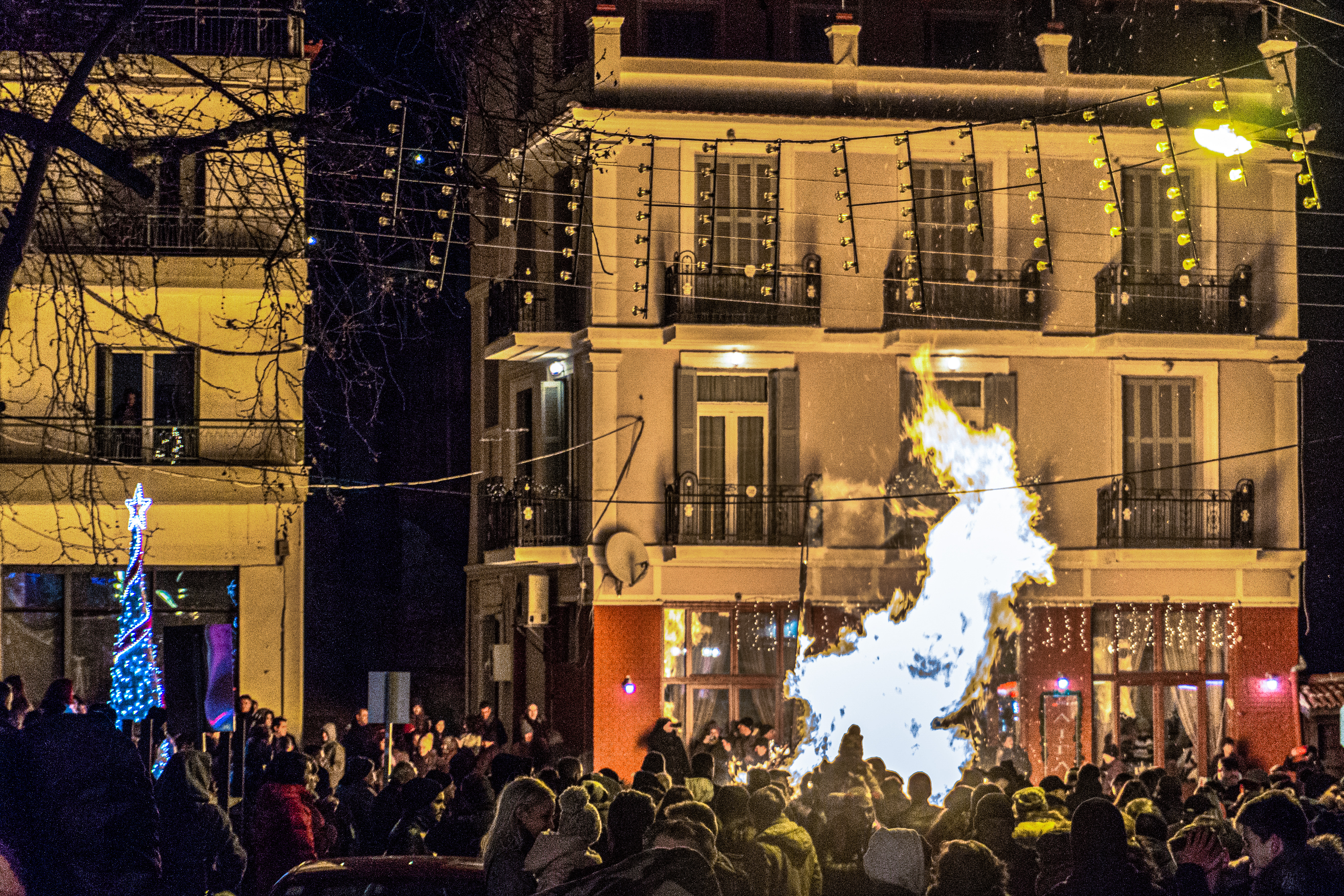
Kladaries fest

- 15 August – Assumption of Mary – The male inhabitants of Siatista parade with their horses down to a chapel in the plain and return with the icon of the Panagia. In the feast and party that ensues the men dance on the backs of their horses. The local wine flows freely, even for their equine friends.
- 23 December – Κλαδαριές (Klatharies) – On this day the inhabitants build tall, (three to six metres), conical shaped mounds that are decorated sparsely with balloons and tinsel. Each neighbourhood group gathers weeds and sticks of wood from the surrounding area throughout the preceding fall, with some groups historically sabotaging one another days before the event. After nightfall, a parade, including a brass band playing local music, starts at the entrance of the town, and marches up from Γεράνια (Yerania), to the top of the town. In succession each mound of brush is set afire as the parade reaches the neighbourhood. The inhabitants then dance around the fires. Many of the village youth then stay up all night around the remnants of the bonfires to start carolling early in the morning of Christmas Eve, collecting money while singing door to door.

== Notable people ==
- Nikolaos Kasomoulis, participant in the Greek Revolution of 1821
- Alexandros Rosios, politician
- Michail Papageorgiou, philosopher
- Peristera Kraka, commander of rebel forces during the 1878 Greek Macedonian rebellion
- Markides Pouliou brothers, publishers of Efimeris in Vienna and partners of Rigas Feraios
- Thalia Flora-Karavia, painter
- Theodoros Manousis, historian
- Theodoros Natsinas, teacher
- Spyridon Samaras, Greek composer and playwright, his father was a native of Siatista

== See also ==
- Ecclesiastical Museum of Siatista
- Paleontological Museum of Siatista
- Botanical Museum of the Mountaineering Association (Siatista)
