= Agios Theodoros, Kozani =

Agios Theodoros Άγιος Θεόδωρος
- Settlement
- Location within Greece
- Coordinates: 40°16.81′N 21°12.93′E
- Country: Greece
- Geographic region: Macedonia
- Administrative region: Western Macedonia
- Regional unit: Kozani
- Municipality: Voio
- Municipal unit: Tsotyli
- Community: Agiasma

Population (2021)
  - Total: 19
- Time zone: UTC+2 (EET)
  - Summer (DST): UTC+3 (EEST)
- Postal code: 500 02
- Area code: +30-2468
- Vehicle registration: ΚΖ

Agios Theodoros (Greek: Άγιος Θεόδωρος, before 1927: Τσάριστα – Tsarista), is a village of the Voio municipality. Before the 2011 local government reform it was part of the municipality of Tsotyli. It is part of the community of Agiasma.

Tsarista was a mixed village and a part of its population were Greek speaking Muslim Vallahades. The 1920 Greek census recorded 95 people in the village, and 45 inhabitants (10 families) were Muslim in 1923. Following the Greek–Turkish population exchange, Greek refugee families in Tsarista were from Asia Minor (1) and Pontus (9) in 1926. The 1928 Greek census recorded 98 village inhabitants. In 1928, the refugee families numbered 10 (41 people).

== See also ==
- List of settlements in the Kozani regional unit
