= Kalkandereh =

Kalkandereh may refer to:

- Kalkandere, a town in Turkey
- Tetovo, a city in Macedonia, formerly known as Kalkandelen
