= Lefkadi, Kozani =

Lefkadi
- Settlement
- Location within Greece
- Coordinates: 40°18′8″N 21°16′51″E
- Country: Greece
- Geographic region: Macedonia
- Administrative region: Western Macedonia
- Regional unit: Kozani
- Municipality: Voio
- Municipal unit: Tsotyli
- Community: Vronti

Population (2021)
  - Total: 9
- Time zone: UTC+2 (EET)
  - Summer (DST): UTC+3 (EEST)
- Vehicle registration: ΚΖ

Lefkadi (Greek: Λευκάδι, before 1927: Βίνιανη – Viniani), is a village in Kozani Regional Unit, Macedonia, Greece. It is part of the community of Vronti.

Viniani was populated by Greek speaking Muslim Vallahades. The 1920 Greek census recorded 208 people in the village, and 150 inhabitants (30 families) were Muslim in 1923. Following the Greek–Turkish population exchange, Greek refugee families in Viniani were from Pontus (34) in 1926. The 1928 Greek census recorded 122 village inhabitants. In 1928, the refugee families numbered 34 (114 people).
