= Alexakis =

Alexakis is a Greek surname. The female form of the surname is Alexaki. Notable people with the surname include:

- Art Alexakis (born 1962), American musician
- Ioannis Sotiris Alexakis (1885–1980), Greek general
- Vassilis Alexakis (1943–2021), Greek-French writer and translator
