= Koiladi, Kozani =

Koiladi
- Settlement
- Location within Greece
- Coordinates: 40°15′54″N 21°11′52″E
- Country: Greece
- Geographic region: Macedonia
- Administrative region: Western Macedonia
- Regional unit: Kozani
- Municipality: Voio
- Municipal unit: Tsotyli
- Community: Agiasma

Population (2021)
  - Total: 1
- Time zone: UTC+2 (EET)
  - Summer (DST): UTC+3 (EEST)
- Vehicle registration: ΚΖ

Koiladi (Greek: Κοιλάδι, before 1927: Τσαβαλέρη – Tsavaleri), is a village in Kozani Regional Unit, Macedonia, Greece. It is part of the community of Agiasma.

Tsavaleri was populated by Greek speaking Muslim Vallahades. The 1920 Greek census recorded 146 people in the village, and 150 inhabitants (30 families) were Muslim in 1923. Following the Greek–Turkish population exchange, Greek refugee families in Tsavaleri were from Pontus (32) in 1926. The 1928 Greek census recorded 111 village inhabitants. In 1928, the refugee families numbered 32 (112 people).
