= Nea Sparti, Kozani =

Nea Sparti
- Settlement
- Location within Greece
- Coordinates: 40°16′00″N 21°18′00″E
- Country: Greece
- Geographic region: Macedonia
- Administrative region: Western Macedonia
- Regional unit: Kozani
- Municipality: Voio
- Municipal unit: Tsotyli
- Community: Tsotyli
- Time zone: UTC+2 (EET)
  - Summer (DST): UTC+3 (EEST)
- Vehicle registration: ΚΖ

Nea Sparti (Greek: Νέα Σπάρτη, before 1928: Βουδωρίνα – Voudorina), was a village in Kozani Regional Unit, Macedonia, Greece. It was part of the community of Tsotyli.

Voudorina was populated by Greek speaking Muslim Vallahades. The 1920 Greek census recorded 177 people in the village, and 150 inhabitants (30 families) were Muslim in 1923. Following the Greek–Turkish population exchange, Greek refugee families in Voudorina were from Asia Minor (22) in 1926. The 1928 Greek census recorded 89 village inhabitants. In 1928, the refugee families numbered 23 (86 people). The village was abolished on 7 April 1951.
