= Achladia, Kozani =

Achladia
- Settlement
- Location within Greece
- Coordinates: 40°16′32″N 21°11′59″E
- Country: Greece
- Geographic region: Macedonia
- Administrative region: Western Macedonia
- Regional unit: Kozani
- Municipality: Voio
- Municipal unit: Tsotyli
- Community: Agiasma

Population (2021)
  - Total: 13
- Time zone: UTC+2 (EET)
  - Summer (DST): UTC+3 (EEST)
- Vehicle registration: ΚΖ

Achladia (Greek: Αχλαδιά, before 1927: Μασγκάν – Masgkan), is a village in Kozani Regional Unit, Macedonia, Greece. It is part of the community of Agiasma.

Masgkan was populated by Greek speaking Muslim Vallahades. The 1920 Greek census recorded 100 people in the village, and 100 inhabitants (25 families) were Muslim in 1923. Following the Greek–Turkish population exchange, Greek refugee families in Masgkan were from Pontus (18) in 1926. The 1928 Greek census recorded 72 village inhabitants. In 1928, the refugee families numbered 18 (65 people).
