= Agia Sofia, Larissa =

Agia Sofia Αγία Σοφία
- Settlement
- Location within Greece
- Coordinates: 39°41.4′N 22°19.1′E
- Country: Greece
- Administrative region: Thessaly
- Regional unit: Larissa
- Municipality: Tyrnavos
- Municipal unit: Tyrnavos
- Community: Dendra Tyrnavou
- Elevation: 85 m (279 ft)

Population (2021)
  - Total: 98
- Time zone: UTC+2 (EET)
  - Summer (DST): UTC+3 (EEST)
- Postal code: 415 00
- Area code: +30-241
- Vehicle registration: PI

Agia Sofia (Greek: Αγία Σοφία, romanized: Agia Sofia, Greek pronunciation: [a'ʝia so'fia]), known as Oxilar (Greek: Οξιλάρ) until 1927, is a village in the municipality of Tyrnavos. Before the 1997 local government reform it was a part of the community of Dendra. The 2021 census recorded 98 inhabitants in the village. Agia Sofia is a part of the local community of Dendra Tyrnavou.

== History ==
In the Ottoman tahrir defter (number 101) of 1521, the settlement was recorded as a village with the name Okçular. Moreover, in the Ottoman tahrir defter (number 225) of 1544, the village included Selanik Yörüks, who had military obligations that required them to give five soldiers (eşküncü) and 20 assistants (yamaks) per household (ocak).

== Etymology ==
The former name Okçular means archers in Turkish. The current name Agia Sofia means Holy Wisdom in Greek.

== See also ==
- List of settlements in the Larissa regional unit
