= Liknades =

Village in the Greek region of Western Macedonia

Liknades Λικνάδες
- Community
- Location within Greece
- Coordinates: 40°18′19″N 21°12′35″E
- Country: Greece
- Administrative region: Western Macedonia
- Regional unit: Kozani
- Municipality: Voio
- Municipal unit: Tsotyli

Population (2021)
  - Community: 29
- Time zone: UTC+2 (EET)
  - Summer (DST): UTC+3 (EEST)
- Postal code: 50002
- Area code: +30 2468

Liknades is a village located in the Voio municipality, situated in western Kozani regional unit, in the Greek region of Western Macedonia. The village is 75 kilometers west of the town of Kozani. The community consists of the villages Liknades and Lefki.

Liknades's elevation is 741 meters above sea level. At the 2021 census the population was 29.

On a hilltop located in the side of the village were discovered the remains of an important ancient settlement of Elimiotis.

Liknades was a mixed village and a part of its population were Greek speaking Muslim Vallahades. In 1923, 160 inhabitants (30 families) were Muslim in Liknades.
