= Vronti =

Vronti Βροντή
- Community
- Location within Greece
- Coordinates: 40°17.596′N 21°17.569′E
- Country: Greece
- Administrative region: Western Macedonia
- Regional unit: Kozani
- Municipality: Voio
- Municipal unit: Tsotyli
- Elevation: 765 m (2,510 ft)

Population (2021)
  - Community: 77
- Time zone: UTC+2 (EET)
  - Summer (DST): UTC+3 (EEST)
- Postal code: 500 02
- Area code: +30-2468
- Vehicle registration: ΚΖ

Vronti (Greek: Βροντή, before 1927: Βρόντιζα – Vrontiza), is a village and a community of the Voio municipality. Before the 2011 local government reform it was part of the municipality of Tsotyli, of which it was a municipal district. The 2021 census recorded 77 inhabitants in the community of Vronti.

Vrontiza was populated by Greek speaking Muslim Vallahades. The 1920 Greek census recorded 472 people in the village, and 470 inhabitants (40 families) were Muslim in 1923. Following the Greek–Turkish population exchange, Greek refugee families in Vrontiza were from Pontus (50) in 1926. The 1928 Greek census recorded 186 village inhabitants. In 1928, the refugee families numbered 49 (177 people).

== Administrative division ==
The community of Vronti consists of three separate settlements:

- Apidia (population 13 in 2021)
- Lefkadi (population 9)
- Vronti (population 55)

== See also ==
- List of settlements in the Kozani regional unit
