= Lefki, Kozani =

Lefki
- Settlement
- Location within Greece
- Coordinates: 40°18′1″N 21°11′51″E
- Country: Greece
- Geographic region: Macedonia
- Administrative region: Western Macedonia
- Regional unit: Kozani
- Municipality: Voio
- Municipal unit: Tsotyli
- Community: Liknades

Population (2021)
  - Total: 18
- Time zone: UTC+2 (EET)
  - Summer (DST): UTC+3 (EEST)
- Vehicle registration: ΚΖ

Lefki (Greek: Λεύκη, before 1927: Σαρότσανη – Sarotsani), is a village in Kozani Regional Unit, Macedonia, Greece. It is part of the community of Liknades.

Sarotsani was populated by Greek speaking Muslim Vallahades. The 1920 Greek census recorded 205 people in the village, and 150 inhabitants (30 families) were Muslim in 1923. Following the Greek–Turkish population exchange, Greek refugee families in Sarotsani were from East Thrace (1) and Pontus (43) in 1926. The 1928 Greek census recorded 160 village inhabitants. In 1928, the refugee families numbered 44 (173 people).
