= Omali, Kozani =

Omali Ομαλή
- Community
- Location within Greece
- Coordinates: 40°15.433′N 21°15.908′E
- Country: Greece
- Administrative region: Western Macedonia
- Regional unit: Kozani
- Municipality: Voio
- Municipal unit: Tsotyli
- Elevation: 787 m (2,582 ft)

Population (2021)
  - Community: 60
- Time zone: UTC+2 (EET)
  - Summer (DST): UTC+3 (EEST)
- Postal code: 500 02
- Area code: +30-2468
- Vehicle registration: ΚΖ

Omali (Greek: Ομαλή, before 1927: Πλάζουμη – Plazoumi), is a village and a community of the Voio municipality. Before the 2011 local government reform it was part of the municipality of Tsotyli, of which it was a municipal district. The 2021 census recorded 60 inhabitants in the community. The settlement of Glykokerasia, with a population of 21 people in 2021, is part of the Omali community.

According to the statistics of Vasil Kanchov ("Macedonia, Ethnography and Statistics"), 240 Greek Christians and 350 Greek Muslims lived in the village in 1900.

Plazoumi was a mixed village and a part of its population were Greek speaking Muslim Vallahades. The 1920 Greek census recorded 488 people in the village, and 260 inhabitants (40 families) were Muslim in 1923. Following the Greek–Turkish population exchange, Greek refugee families in Plazoumi were from East Thrace (13) and Asia Minor (36) in 1926. The 1928 Greek census recorded 315 village inhabitants. In 1928, the refugee families numbered 44 (180 people).
