= Ottoman baths of Tyrnavos =

Historical hamam in Tyrnavos, Greece

Coordinates: 39°44′01″N 22°17′48″E

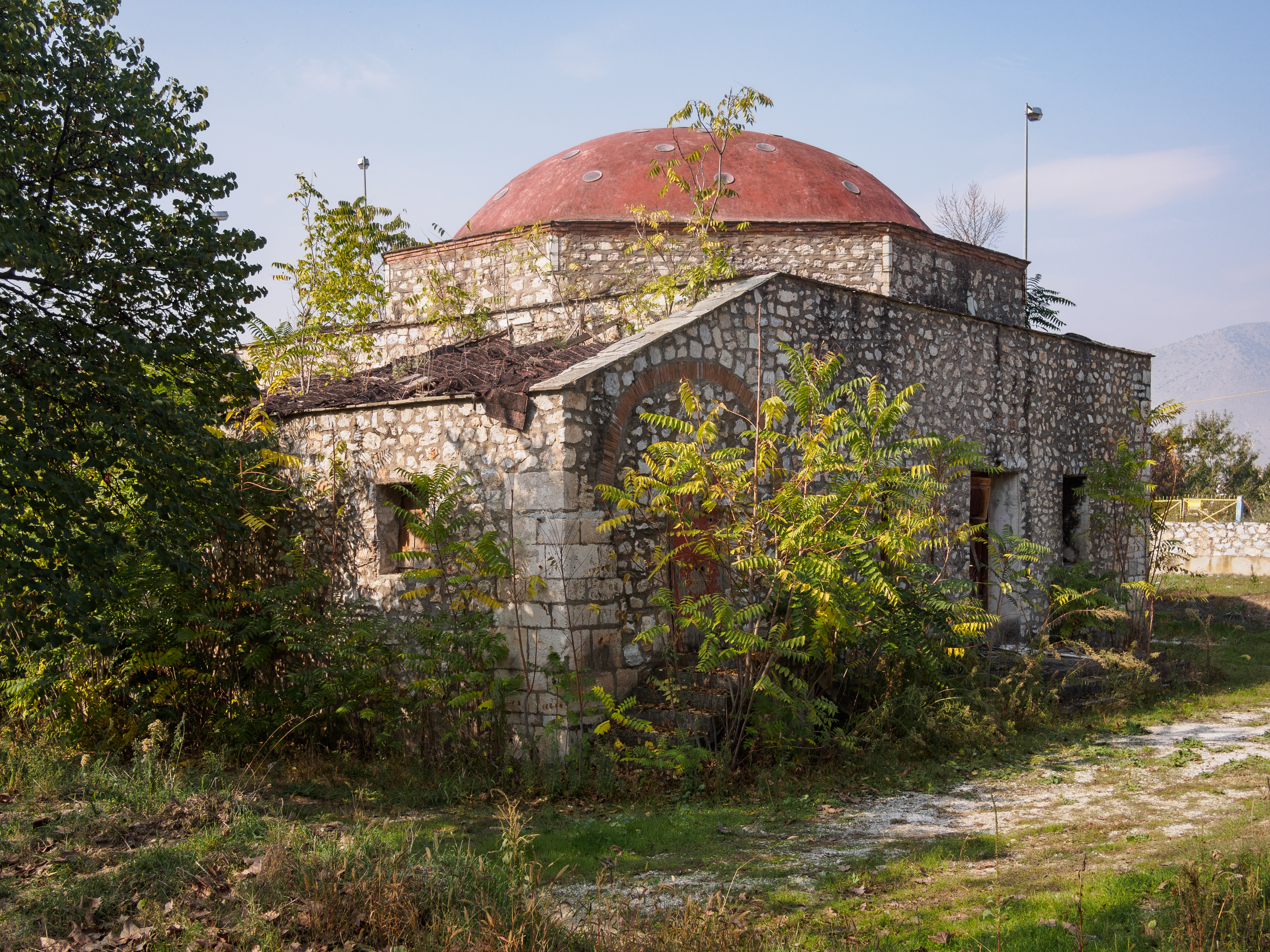
Ottoman baths of Tyrnavos

The Ottoman baths of Tyrnavos (Greek: Οθωμανικό λουτρό Τυρνάβου) is a partially preserved Ottoman bath (hamam) in the town of Tyrnavos in Thessaly, Greece, dating to the early 19th century.

The hamam is located outside the town proper, near the bridge of the Pineios River and the South-Eastern Europe Brigade army camp. It survives only in part, consequently the precise arrangement of its rooms, or the position of the heating ovens, are unknown. Its construction is tentatively placed in the early 19th century. The surviving structure is a rectangle, with a main square hall flanked by two elongated halls and another, smaller square room. The square rooms are covered by domes, while the elongated ones by hull-shaped roofs.

The building was restored in the early 1990s, and converted to host cultural exhibitions and events. Despite occasional use for such events, today the site is closed to the public.
