= Lygaria, Larissa =

Lygaria Λυγαριά
- Settlement
- Location within Greece
- Coordinates: 39°49.8′N 22°16.2′E
- Country: Greece
- Administrative region: Thessaly
- Regional unit: Larissa
- Municipality: Tyrnavos
- Municipal unit: Tyrnavos
- Community: Tyrnavos
- Elevation: 110 m (360 ft)

Population (2021)
  - Total: 53
- Time zone: UTC+2 (EET)
  - Summer (DST): UTC+3 (EEST)
- Postal code: 401 00
- Area code: +30-2492
- Vehicle registration: PI

Lygaria (Greek: Λυγαριά, Greek pronunciation: [liɣa'ɾʝa]) is a village in the municipality of Tyrnavos. Before 1966 it was a part of the community of Argyropouli. The 2021 census recorded 53 inhabitants in the village. Lygaria is a part of the community of Tyrnavos.

== History ==
In the Ottoman tahrir defter (number 101) of 1521, the settlement was recorded as a village with the name Karadere. Moreover, in the Ottoman tahrir defter (number 225) of 1544, the village included Selanik Yörüks, who had military obligations that required them to give five soldiers (eşküncü) and 20 assistants (yamaks) per household (ocak).

== See also ==
- List of settlements in the Larissa regional unit
