= Glykokerasia =

- Settlement
- Location within Greece
- Coordinates: 40°15′30″N 21°16′30″E
- Country: Greece
- Geographic region: Macedonia
- Administrative region: Western Macedonia
- Regional unit: Kozani
- Municipality: Voio
- Municipal unit: Tsotyli
- Community: Omali

Population (2021)
  - Total: 21
- Time zone: UTC+2 (EET)
  - Summer (DST): UTC+3 (EEST)
- Vehicle registration: ΚΖ

Glykokerasia (Greek: Γλυκοκερασιά, before 1927: Τσιαραπιανή – Tsiarapiani), is a village in Kozani Regional Unit, Macedonia, Greece. It is part of the community of Omali.

Tsiarapiani as populated by Greek speaking Muslim Vallahades. The 1920 Greek census recorded 98 people in the village, and 70 inhabitants (15 families) were Muslim in 1923. Following the Greek–Turkish population exchange, Greek refugee families in Tsiarapiani were from East Thrace (5) and Asia Minor (10) in 1926. The 1928 Greek census recorded 62 village inhabitants. In 1928, the refugee families numbered 16 (58 people).
