= Kritiri =

Kritiri Κριτήρι
- Settlement
- Location within Greece
- Coordinates: 39°45.3′N 22°17.4′E
- Country: Greece
- Administrative region: Thessaly
- Regional unit: Larissa
- Municipality: Tyrnavos
- Municipal unit: Tyrnavos
- Community: Tyrnavos
- Elevation: 90 m (300 ft)

Population (2021)
  - Total: 1,096
- Time zone: UTC+2 (EET)
  - Summer (DST): UTC+3 (EEST)
- Postal code: 401 00
- Area code: +30-2492
- Vehicle registration: PI

Kritiri (Greek: Κριτήρι, Greek pronunciation: [kɾi'tiɾi]) is a village in the municipality of Tyrnavos. Kritiri is a part of the community of Tyrnavos.

== Population ==
Historical population
Year	Pop.	±%
2001	1,129	—
2011	1,415	+25.3%
2021	1,096	−22.5%

== See also ==
- List of settlements in the Larissa regional unit
