= Agiasma, Kozani =

Agiasma Αγίασμα
- Community
- Location within Greece
- Coordinates: 40°16′46″N 21°14′19″E
- Country: Greece
- Administrative region: Western Macedonia
- Regional unit: Kozani
- Municipality: Voio
- Municipal unit: Tsotyli
- Elevation: 776 m (2,546 ft)

Population (2021)
  - Community: 35
- Time zone: UTC+2 (EET)
  - Summer (DST): UTC+3 (EEST)
- Postal code: 500 02
- Area code: +30-2468
- Vehicle registration: ΚΖ

Agiasma (Greek: Αγίασμα, before 1927: Λατόριστα – Latorista), is a village and a community of the Voio municipality. Before the 2011 local government reform it was part of the municipality of Tsotyli, of which it was a municipal district. The 2021 census recorded 35 inhabitants in the community of Agiasma. According to the statistics of Vasil Kanchov ("Macedonia, Ethnography and Statistics"), 55 Greek Christians and 55 Vallahades (Grecophone Muslims) lived in the village in 1900.

Pre–war and post–war immigration from Agiasma led to the formation of a diaspora and most of the village population lives abroad in the northern suburbs of Melbourne in Australia.

== Administrative division ==
The community of Agiasma consists of four separate settlements:

- Agiasma (population 2 in 2021)
- Agios Theodoros (population 19)
- Achladia (population 13)
- Koiladi (population 1)

== See also ==
- List of settlements in the Kozani regional unit
