= Platanoulia =

Platanoulia Πλατανούλια
- Settlement
- Location within Greece
- Coordinates: 39°40.6′N 22°18.5′E
- Country: Greece
- Administrative region: Thessaly
- Regional unit: Larissa
- Municipality: Tyrnavos
- Municipal unit: Tyrnavos
- Community: Dendra
- Elevation: 90 m (300 ft)

Population (2021)
  - Total: 467
- Time zone: UTC+2 (EET)
  - Summer (DST): UTC+3 (EEST)
- Postal code: 415 00
- Area code: +30-241
- Vehicle registration: PI

Platanoulia (Greek: Πλατανούλια, Greek pronunciation: [plata'nuʎa]) is a village in the municipality of Tyrnavos. Before the 1997 local government reform it was a part of the community of Dendra.

== Population ==
Historical population
Year	Pop.	±%
2001	512	—
2011	563	+10.0%
2021	467	−17.1%

== Climate ==
Climate data for Platanoulia 90 m a.s.l.
Month	Jan	Feb	Mar	Apr	May	Jun	Jul	Aug	Sep	Oct	Nov	Dec	Year
Record high °C (°F)	22.3 (72.1)	22.6 (72.7)	27.9 (82.2)	32.1 (89.8)	36.8 (98.2)	41.4 (106.5)	43.7 (110.7)	44.3 (111.7)	38.9 (102.0)	33.2 (91.8)	22.9 (73.2)	22.5 (72.5)	44.3 (111.7)
Mean daily maximum °C (°F)	12.0 (53.6)	14.4 (57.9)	17.5 (63.5)	21.1 (70.0)	26.7 (80.1)	33.3 (91.9)	36.0 (96.8)	35.4 (95.7)	30.0 (86.0)	23.6 (74.5)	17.8 (64.0)	13.3 (55.9)	23.4 (74.2)
Daily mean °C (°F)	6.0 (42.8)	7.8 (46.0)	10.6 (51.1)	14.0 (57.2)	19.1 (66.4)	25.1 (77.2)	27.7 (81.9)	26.8 (80.2)	22.1 (71.8)	16.2 (61.2)	11.9 (53.4)	8.3 (46.9)	16.3 (61.3)
Mean daily minimum °C (°F)	1.1 (34.0)	2.0 (35.6)	4.3 (39.7)	7.3 (45.1)	11.8 (53.2)	17.2 (63.0)	19.4 (66.9)	19.0 (66.2)	15.2 (59.4)	10.1 (50.2)	6.8 (44.2)	4.1 (39.4)	9.9 (49.7)
Record low °C (°F)	−8.7 (16.3)	−7.6 (18.3)	−5.3 (22.5)	−1.7 (28.9)	5.7 (42.3)	8.2 (46.8)	14.0 (57.2)	12.3 (54.1)	5.5 (41.9)	3.3 (37.9)	−3.0 (26.6)	−4.8 (23.4)	−8.7 (16.3)
Average rainfall mm (inches)	41.3 (1.63)	20.1 (0.79)	41.5 (1.63)	40.0 (1.57)	30.9 (1.22)	28.6 (1.13)	17.2 (0.68)	15.9 (0.63)	67.0 (2.64)	36.1 (1.42)	47.0 (1.85)	67.5 (2.66)	453.1 (17.85)
Source 1: National Observatory of Athens Monthly Bulletins (Feb 2018 - Oct 2025)
Source 2: Platanoulia N.O.A station, World Meteorological Organization

== See also ==
- List of settlements in the Larissa regional unit
