= Jamaković =

Origin
- Language: Ottoman Turkish
- Meaning: Yamak

Jamaković is a Bosniak family name. It is derived from the Ottoman Turkish word Yamak, which is a member of the local Ottoman Muslim auxiliary troops. Amar Jamaković was a revolutionary leader of a subdivision of Second Handžar Division.
