= Perichora, Larissa =

Village in Greece

Perichora Περίχωρα
- Settlement
- Location within Greece
- Coordinates: 39°41′28″N 22°16′5″E
- Country: Greece
- Administrative region: Thessaly
- Regional unit: Larissa
- Municipality: Tyrnavos
- Municipal unit: Tyrnavos
- Community: Tyrnavos
- Elevation: 85 m (279 ft)

Population (2021)
  - Total: 34
- Time zone: UTC+2 (EET)
  - Summer (DST): UTC+3 (EEST)
- Postal code: 401 00
- Area code: +30-2492
- Vehicle registration: PI

Perichora (Greek: Περίχωρα, Greek pronunciation: [pe'ɾixoɾa]) is a village in the municipality of Tyrnavos. The 2021 census recorded 34 inhabitants in the village. Perichora is a part of the community of Tyrnavos.

== See also ==
- List of settlements in the Larissa regional unit
