= Dendra Tyrnavou =

Dendra Tyrnavou Δένδρα Τυρνάβου
- Community
- Location within Greece
- Coordinates: 39°41.3′N 22°20.3′E
- Country: Greece
- Administrative region: Thessaly
- Regional unit: Larissa
- Municipality: Tyrnavos
- Municipal unit: Tyrnavos

Area
  - Community: 45.042 km^{2} (17.391 sq mi)
- Elevation: 85 m (279 ft)

Population (2021)
  - Community: 1,287
  - Density: 28.57/km^{2} (74.00/sq mi)
- Time zone: UTC+2 (EET)
  - Summer (DST): UTC+3 (EEST)
- Postal code: 415 00
- Area code: +30-241
- Vehicle registration: PI

Dendra Tyrnavou (Greek: Δένδρα Τυρνάβου, Greek pronunciation: ['ðenðɾa tiɾ'navu]) is a village and a community of the Tyrnavos municipality. Before the 2011 local government reform it was a part of the municipality of Tyrnavos. The community of Dendra Tyrnavou covers an area of 45.042 km^{2}.

== Administrative division ==
The community of Dendra Tyrnavou consists of three separate settlements:

- Agia Sofia (population 98 in 2021)
- Dendra (population 722)
- Platanoulia (population 467)

== Population ==
Historical population
Year	Pop.	±%
2001	1,031	—
2011	1,291	+25.2%
2021	1,287	−0.3%

== See also ==
- List of settlements in the Larissa regional unit
