= Kalkandere District =

District of Rize Province, Turkey

- District
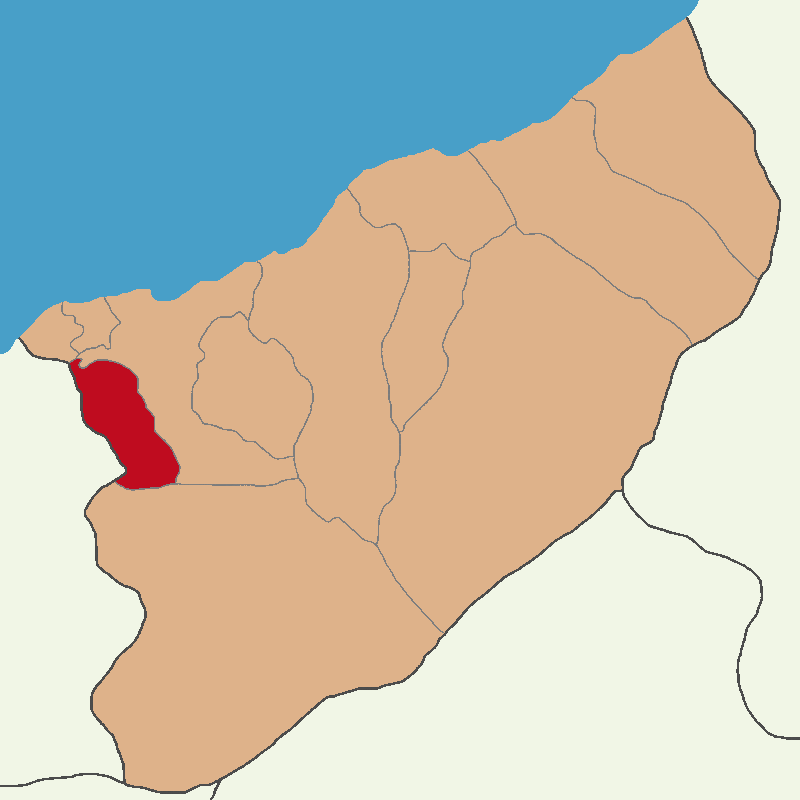
- Map showing Kalkandere District in Rize Province

- Location in Turkey
- Coordinates: 40°56′N 40°27′E
- Country: Turkey
- Province: Rize
- Seat: Kalkandere

Government
  - Kaymakam: Ahmet Açıkgöz
- Area: 107 km^{2} (41 sq mi)
- Population (2021): 13,511
  - Density: 130/km^{2} (330/sq mi)
- Time zone: UTC+3 (TRT)
- Website: www.kalkandere.gov.tr

Kalkandere District is a district of the Rize Province of Turkey. Its seat is the town of Kalkandere. Its area is 107 km^{2}, and its population is 13,511 (2021). There is a distance of 21 km between Kalkandere and Rize city center, located in the Black Sea Region.

Formerly known as Karadere, this is a hilly, forested, rural area of scattered villages, inland from the Black Sea coast. There is little flat land and this is an impoverished area losing its population as they migrate away to jobs in other parts of Turkey or abroad. The local economy depends on growing tea on the hillsides. 90% of the agricultural land is tea plantations and there are tea processing plants in the town Kalkandere. Tea was planted in the 1950s and has brought new life to the area. Other activities include bee-keeping.

== Composition ==
There is one municipality in Kalkandere District:

- Kalkandere

There are 22 villages in Kalkandere District:

- Çağlayan
- Çayırlı
- Dülgerli
- Esendere
- Esentepe
- Fındıklı
- Geçitli
- Hurmalık
- Hüseyinhoca
- Inciköy
- Kayabaşı
- Ormanlı
- Pınarköy
- Seyrantepe
- Soğuksu
- Ünalan
- Yenigeçitli
- Yeniköy
- Yeşilköy
- Yokuşlu
- Yolbaşı
- Yumurtatepe
