= South-Eastern Europe Brigade =

Brigade of North Atlantic Treaty Organization

The South-Eastern Europe Brigade or SEEBRIG is a multinational brigade with forces from Albania, Bulgaria, Greece, North Macedonia, Romania, and Turkey. It was established in the spirit of NATO's Partnership for Peace initiative.

It was established in August 1999, based on the Multinational Peace Force South-Eastern Europe (MPFSEE) agreement concluded between the defence ministers of the participating countries at Skopje on 26 September 1998. The brigade is available for UN, NATO, or EU peacekeeping missions, but can also be deployed independently as a self-contained unit.

The brigade numbers some 5,000 troops, comprising four mechanized infantry battalions, and an engineer task force (ETF) that provides "an emergency relief and humanitarian intervention capabilities."

The participating troops remain at their home stations but are coordinated by a common headquarters. This was initially based at Plovdiv in Bulgaria, before moving to Constanta in Romania in 2003, Istanbul in Turkey in 2007, Tyrnavos in Greece in 2011, and Kumanovo in North Macedonia as of 2020.
