= Ioannis Sotiris Alexakis =

Cretan lieutenant general

- Born: c. 1885; Potamoi, Lasithi Plateau, Ottoman Crete
- Died: 26 February 1980 (aged 94)
- Burial place: Municipal Cemetery of Heraklion
- Military career
- Allegiance: Greece
- Branch: (Greece) Hellenic Army
- Service years: 1912–1945
- Rank: Lieutenant general
- Awards: Numerous medals
- Other work: Historical writer

Ioannis Sotiris Alexakis (1885–1980) was a Cretan lieutenant general who fought in several major conflicts and wars such as the Balkan Wars, World War I, the Greco-Turkish War, World War II, and numerous other battles. Throughout his military career Alexakis was awarded 20 medals for bravery.

== Early life and education ==
Ioannis was born on 1 November 1885 in the village of Potamoi, at the Lasithi Plateau on the then-Turkish occupied island of Crete. Many of his relatives fought for Crete's independence from the Ottomans, including Michael Alexis, Nicholas Alexios Alexis, Alexios Alexis, and the nobleman Misser Alexis.

He spent a majority of his later school years in the nearby city of Agios Nikolaos, Crete.

Alexakis started to serve in the Hellenic Army and graduated from the Hellenic Military Academy. He quickly climbed the ranks. One of his first successes came when Alexakis was 27 and received orders to proceed to Thessaloniki. He executed the order quickly and his platoon was the first to enter Thessaloniki on 26 October 1912.

== Junior army officer, Balkan Wars of 1912 and 1913 ==
On October 26, 1912 The Greek Army accepted the surrender of the Ottoman garrison at Thessaloniki. Following the city's surrender to Greece, the Bulgarian army arrived in Thessaloniki one day later. Hasan Tahsin Pasha, the Ottoman ruler of the city, conveyed to the Bulgarian officer: "I had only one Thessaloniki, which I had to surrender." On October 14, 1912, Crete was annexed to Greece. Alexakis, a fervent supporter of Eleftherios Venizelos and his Venizelism ideology, continued the northern advance. With the support of the Allies, Greece expanded its borders. Throughout the Balkan Wars of 1912 and 1913, Alexakis' forces demonstrated swift mobility, achieving decisive victories in key battles, such as the Battle of Arnaia on November 2, 1912, the capture of Ierissos and Mount Athos from the Ottoman Turks before the arrival of the Bulgarian Army, the Battle of Kilkis–Lachanas in June 1913, and the engagement over Height 1378 in July 1913. These triumphs, albeit costly in casualties on both sides, saw Greece endure 8,652 killed and wounded, while Bulgaria sustained losses of 7,000 killed and wounded, with 2,500 captured. Alexakis himself sustained injuries twice during these conflicts, notably on July 12, 1913, when he suffered a serious wound to the heart. Following these battles, Bulgaria was expelled from Macedonia.

== First World War, 1914–1918 ==
When the Balkan Wars ended in autumn of 1913, the balance of power had changed. The Ottoman Empire had lost almost all its European holdings, Bulgaria was defeated, Serbia made some gains and Greece was enlarged. This rearrangement soon ignited a new crisis, the prelude to the First World War, which started on 28 July 1914. By September 1916, Bulgaria had seized considerable territories in northeastern Greece.

The Prime Minister Eleftherios Venizelos formed a Provisional Government of National Defense in Thessaloniki and Alexakis was an adjutant in this government.

Many skirmishes, conflicts and a number of battles had started again amongst the Balkan countries. Therefore, in 1918, Alexakis was sent with his forces to northern Greece where, on 17 May 1918, during the fourteen-day Battle of Skra-di-Legen, he was injured.

Later in September, the Battle of Doiran commenced and was one of the surprises of World War I; it is called the battle of "P" Ridge which occurred on 18 September 1918. The fierce attack lasted three days before the Bulgarian army collapsed. Alexakis was given the Distinguished Service Medal by the General Louis Franchet d'Espèrey.

This quick victory was the result of a well-planned attack by the Allies which compelled Bulgaria to give up and sign the Armistice of Salonica on 29 September 1918. This armistice was signed by General d'Espèrey and shortly after this, on 11 November 1918, the First World War was over.

== Interwar period ==
After the First World War, unity and a constitutional government were restored in Athens. During these years of peace, Alexakis researched and wrote accurate accounts and articles of historic merit.

However, three years later in 1921, he was ordered back to line of military duty for the Asia Minor Campaign. Under the Treaty of Sèvres in 1920, between the Allied powers and the Ottoman Empire, Greece had a mandate for the occupation of Smyrna but the treaty, although signed was never ratified. Based on this treaty, the Greeks advanced beyond Smyrna, but by September 1922 Turkey recovered the land in Asia Minor. The Turkish forces killed most of the Greeks in Asia Minor and burned down Smyrna. In 1923, by the Treaty of Lausanne, Greece lost all territorial rights in Asia Minor and a Greco-Turkish population exchange was arranged. Alexakis was injured on 1 July 1921, before the Greek front collapsed and the Turkish army advanced.

In 1924, Alexakis attended the Cours Supérieur d'État-Major in France, and later he was promoted from Colonel to Major General. In 1937, in a demonstration against the Ioannis Metaxas' dictatorship, Alexakis was demobilized and served as Commander of Athens' garrison until the Second World War. In 1940 Benito Mussolini decided to capture Greece and therefore, the country again had Alexakis fight against the Italian troops.

== Second World War, 1939–1945 ==
The Greco-Italian War started on 28 October 1940. Following the declaration of war with Italy, Alexakis returned to the line for the Battle of Elaia–Kalamas on the Albanian border, from which the Italian troops were trying to enter Greece. The Hellenic Army repelled the Italian offensives and by November 1940 the victory in the Battle of Elaia-Kalamas signaled the failure of the Italian attacks. Alexakis then returned to the capital to serve as Military Commander in Athens. On 6 April 1941, Nazi Germany invaded Greece through Bulgaria, creating a second front.

With the German advance, Alexakis was posted to Heraklion and was assigned the duty of Military Commander in Crete, which the Germans attacked in May–June 1941 in the Battle of Crete.

The Germans held Crete until late 1944. Towards the end they put hundreds of war prisoners on a boat which was hit by a torpedo and sank. All but one drowned, and it has been said and believed that it was Alexakis who survived; he had escaped before the torpedo hit. The other prisoners of war perished; their whereabouts were unknown.

== Researcher and writer of historical interest ==
The Second World War ended on 12 September 1945. Alexakis gained the admiration of the Allied forces and was recognized for his heroism. Overall, the Allied forces decorated Alexakis 20 times with medals for his courage and in 1945 he was promoted to the rank of lieutenant general. After his forty years of military service, he remained active as a historical writer, researcher, lecturer, and held sessions on historical events which are documented in historical archives. As a member of numerous social committees and the Parnassos Literary Society, he received public adulation, and he shared his memories with many people. Alexakis wrote and published 23 books and he contributed to Encyclopedias, newspapers and magazines. His books and articles are used as forums for historical information and discussion.

== Legacy ==
Ioannis Sotiris Alexakis died on 24 May 1980, and is interred in the Municipal Cemetery of Heraklion. He was buried with the full military honors.

A museum whose contents of historical interest reflect the General's forty years of military service is located inside the Municipal Library of Agios Nikolaos, Crete. Also, in this city as well as in the city of Heraklion and other towns, several streets have been named after him.

== Encyclopedias, bibliography, citations ==
- A. Moorehead, Mediterranean Front, 1942
- Everyman's Encyclopedia, Third Edition in twelve volumes, London, J. M. Dent & Sons Ltd
- Encyclopedia PAPYRUS-LAROUSSE-BRITANNICA, 61 volumes, Alexakis Ioannis Sotiris
- Encyclopedia CHARI PATSI, Volume 4, page 437, Alexakis Ioannis (1885-1980)
- Encyclopedia YDRIA, Volume 5, page 361, Alexakis, Ioannis S.
- Encyclopedia NEA DOMH, Volume 2, page 254, Alexakis, Ioannis Sotiris
- Encyclopedia HILIOS-Newest Encyclopedic Dictionary, Volume 2, page 516, General Ioannis Alexakis, military career, author of 23 books
- Encyclopedia DRANDAKI, Alexakis, Ioannis
- Dillys Powell, Remember Greece, 1941
- Hills of Blood, History & Northern Hellas
