= Nicholas Alexios Alexis =

Cretan independence leader (1761-1818)

Nicholas Alexios Alexis (1761-1818) was a key figure and a resistance leader in the independence struggle in Crete. He was born in Marmaketo, a village of Lassithi Plateau, in 1761 when Crete was part of the Ottoman Empire. He was a son of Alexios Alexis (1692-1786) and a grandson of the nobleman Misser Alexis (1637- ? ).

== Early life ==
His parents and the monks at Krustallenias Monastery, near Marmaketo, were his first teachers, as there were no schools in Lasithi at that time. In 1780 the infamous and very wealthy Ottoman, Ali Chanialis, became “mukataa”-collector, i.e. the one who received one tenth of the produce as tax, or tithe. Chanialis sought to usurp the Lassithi Plateau as an hereditary fief. He forced oppressed taxpayer growers to pay to him greater “mukataa” amounts in produce and thus increased his wealth at the expense of the people and the Government of the Ottoman Empire.

Chanialis forced Nicholas to become the manager of his wealth and his “mukataa” dealings. He believed Nicholas to be the most appropriate candidate for the job. Although Nicholas flatly refused it, he finally succumbed to Chanialis’ demand and became both secretary and manager of the illegally collected taxes. Chanialis also wanted Nicholas to become supervisor of his mansion in the village of Magoulas, where Chanialis was living and where people there knew of his rapacity, illegal omnipotence and sexual orgies. This mansion stands to this day, next to the village fountain.

== A peaceful opposition plan ==
Nicholas wanted to free himself from this service into which he was forcibly recruited. To effect this he married and was ordained into the priesthood in 1786. He became the priest for the village of Magoulas and fathered fourteen children.

Later, he thought about a way to peacefully eliminate the dangerous Chanialis who abused his position. In the meantime, Chanialis had become an “Agha of the Janissaries” (officer-leader of local janissaries) and had been raping young girls. Nicholas decided to put an end to Chanialis rapacious ventures and his illegal acts. He accompanied a Committee to Constantinople; its purpose was to convince the Government of the Ottoman Empire to put a stop to the aberrant behaviour of Chanialis.

Indeed, the committee’s goal was achieved when a firman was issued by the Sultan to kill Chanialis. Chanialis was strangled in the Koules Fortress, the office of the Governor General Pasha of Crete in the Grand Castle, Heraklion, by order of the Sultan on 26 December 1815. Priest Nicholas Alexis noted the following in the margin of the Gospel: “1815, 26 Δεκεμβρίου (December) - Chanialis was choked-killed by the Sultan’s order”. Even today the name Chanialis is known in Crete and there are many folk songs cursing those false witnesses who had appeared in court to support the claims of Ali Chanialis.

== Under Ottoman rule ==
In 1817, Nicholas’ eldest son, Giorgis, (aged 29), along with two comrades, Bobo and Arnaoutis, planned an ambush and killed another notorious janissary named Tsoulis. The Ottomans retaliated and persecuted the children of the priest Nicholas Alexis and anyone that happened to be named Alexis. The older child Giorgis escaped to Cefalonia and changed his name to Moses. Another two of his children, Alexander and Manolis, were killed by the Ottoman Turks. Seven moved to other villages to hide and avoid arrests. During the struggles which continued for many years, three more young boys of Nicholas were captured in 1823, sold as slaves and expatriated; their whereabouts were unknown for many years.

== Death ==
The Reverend Nicholas Alexis died in the great epidemic of plague in 1818. He was 57 years of age and with him died his wife and their last child aged four. Together, the three were buried in one tomb with the mother hugging the child to her bosom, in the church of Saint Spyridon in the village of Magoulas. The remaining ten orphan children of the family, scattered around the nearby villages. Some children hid, emigrated, or changed their surname to avoid arrests, prosecutions and Islamization. Three young boys, aged six to nine, were placed in the household of a priest in a nearby village. Later, in 1823, during the Turkish abductions, these boys, Emmanouil, Antonios, and Andreas were captured and sold abroad as slaves.

== His fourteen children ==
Here are the fourteen children of Nicholas Alexis, all born in the village of Magoulas:

1. The eldest Giorgis (1787- ? ) killed the janissary Tsoulis in 1817. The place where the ambush occurred is known today as the Tsoulis Rock-Stone Point. Giorgis escaped to Cefalonia and changed his name to Moses.
2. Alexander (1790-1820) was a member of the team led by his older brother Giorgis who slew Tsoulis. He was persecuted and emigrated from the village of Magoulas, but he was discovered in the village of Malevizi where the Turks arrested and killed him in 1820.
3. Manolis Alexis, was killed by a Turk who claimed the large bounty placed upon his head by the Turkish authorities after the Alexises had killed janissary Tsoulis.
4. George (1793 - ? ), took refuge in the village of Panagia where he became the priest there with surname Papadakis; when his father died, he inherited the priestly garments.
5. Maria, wife of Konia Ntolapsi
6. Kyriaki, married C. Lidakis in the village of Mesa Potamoi
7. Rodanthi, married C. Ntolapsi in the village of Magoulas
8. Kalliope, married in the village of Kalloni, Heraklion
9. Vasiliki, wife of C. Miliara in the nearby village of Psychro
10. Michael ( ? - 1863), he escaped to the village of Exo Potamoi
11. son, was captured,
12. son, was captured,
13. son, was captured,
14. child (1814-1818), died of plague together with his parents

== Encyclopedias and citations ==
- Encyclopedia CHARI PATSI, Volume 4, pg. 608, Alexis Nikolas (1761-1818)
- Encyclopedia YDRIA, Volume 5, pg. 438, Alexis Nikolas+Alexis of Malevizi
- Encyclopedia DOMH, Volume 2, pg. 275, Alexis, priest Nikolas
- Encyclopedia HLIOS-Newest Encyclopedic Dictionary, Volume 2, pg. 574, Alexis priest Nikolas
- Encyclopedia HLIOS-Newest Encyclopedic Dictionary, Volume 2, pg. 516, General Ioannis Sotiris Alexakis, author of the book ‘The ALEXISES’, 1969
- Encyclopedia YDRIA, Volume 5, pg. 361, Alexakis I. S.

== Footnote ==
Any information that has been mentioned corresponds to those cited in encyclopedias, books, archives, documents and other sources which are all located in the two National Libraries: Εθνική Βιβλιοθήκη της Ελλάδος and Βικελαία Δημοτική Βιβλιοθήκη | Δήμος Ηρακλείου
