= Alexios Alexis =

18th-century Cretan soldier

Alexios Alexis (1692-1786) was a soldier from Lassithi Plateau on the island of Crete. He played a major role in the Cretan wars for independence. His father was the nobleman Misser Alexis (1637 - ? ). Alexios led a large and eminent family and some of his descendants reached high ranks in Greece and abroad, including Nicholas Alexios Alexis, and the Army General Ioannis Sotiris Alexakis.

== Early life, Ottoman rule, retaliations and causes ==
In 1692 Alexios was born in the village of Potamous. An Ottoman Turk beat his fifty-five-year-old father almost to death and pursued everyone named Alexis. The fortune of the Alexis family was confiscated. His two older brothers, Manolis and Yiannis (aged 22 and 29), retaliated and war began in Zenia, a nearby village in Lassithi Plateau, forcing them to move Alexios from Potamous to Marmaketo to save him from vengeance.

Years later he regained some of his father's seized estates and that were illegally sold by the Turks. The Christian villagers that bought the property, returned it to Alexios Alexis whenever he appeared in their villages. For years, Alexios Alexis moved from Marmaketo to Houmeriako, Psychro, Mirabello, Viannos, Malia, Megalo Kastro-Heraklion, and elsewhere. On these trips he wore simple clothes to avoid attention. He had only one fellow-traveler who rode on a donkey, while Alexios walked ahead of him, incognito. This role-playing was meant to avoid the Turks’ attention and to pass unnoticed.

== Struggle against Ottoman rule ==
His walking journeys and mountain hikes had another purpose. With other prominent Cretans he planned Crete's revolutionary uprising against the Ottoman tyranny.

== Leadership ==
The name Alexis was considered a Byzantine name which was deemed to be a link between Hellenism and Byzantine culture; his father had, in Lassithi and elsewhere, estates such as orchards and hereditary fiefs from the Byzantine period (961-1204), most of which were given to the Prefectures. He donated a Byzantine feudal estate in Viannos to host a resort in Crete. Byzantine nobleman Alexis Kallergis and his family (formerly the Phokas family) used Lassithi as a base during the Cretan revolutions of 1283 and 1364. According to tradition, the Alexis family had an affinity with the Cretan Callergi or (Kallergi) family, which had many members named Alexis and, like other freedom fighters of Crete, were patriots people involved with issues and beliefs that benefited their homeland. Alexis donated properties to the Monastery of Agias Pelagias and the Crystallenias or (Croustallenias) Monastery.

== Personal life ==
In 1715, Alexios married his first wife, who was from Kritsa. They had three sons and three daughters. She died in 1735. In 1737, he remarried, to Chryssie. They had no children. In 1760, at sixty-eight years of age, he married for the third time. His much younger wife was Annezina from Simi and gave birth to a child named Nicholas. This son Nicholas Alexios Alexis (1761-1818), later became a priest in the nearby village of Magoulas and father of fourteen children.

== Legacy ==
His first six children were persecuted and forced into exile by the Ottomans or moved to other places where they changed names in order to survive. The first son was killed by the Turks in Farsaro. The others married in Kritsa and Psychro. They had four sons: Marcos settled in Farsaro, Nicholas in Myrtos and later settled in Psychro; Alexios in Karavados and then in Psychro; and Captain Manolis Alexis changed his name to Manolis Kazanis in Kritsa.

Due to his renowned family name and his great age, he was known towards the end of his life in Crete and in Venice as Alexis the elder. His descendants were explorers, scientists and benefactors. His descendants were also fighters during Cretan wars for Liberty in 1841, 1867, 1878, 1889, 1895 - 1898, 1912, 1914–1918, and 1940–1944. Descendants include Alexandris N. Alexis (1790-1820); Alexis of Maleviziou was said to be the one who signed on 14/10/1830 the letter for peace sent to La Fayette; the warrior chieftain, Captain Nicholas Papadakis-Alexis (1860-1913); General Ioannis Sotiris Alexakis (1885-1980) who liberated Thessaloniki. Alexios’ father, Misser Alexis, born while Crete was part of the Venetian Republic, is mentioned in historical documents and archives in Venice, Ca' Vendramin Calergi Library.

== Note ==
"Lassithi has small villages, but all have God’s gift. Small villages, which gave birth to great men." (M. Dialinas).

== Footnote ==
All reference material and information mentioned above or below can be found in The National Library of Greece, Athens, or in Vikelaia Municipal Library, Tel: 2810-409702 and 2810-301543, Crete.
