= Tyrnavos =

Town in Thessaly, Greece

Tyrnavos Τύρναβος
- Municipality
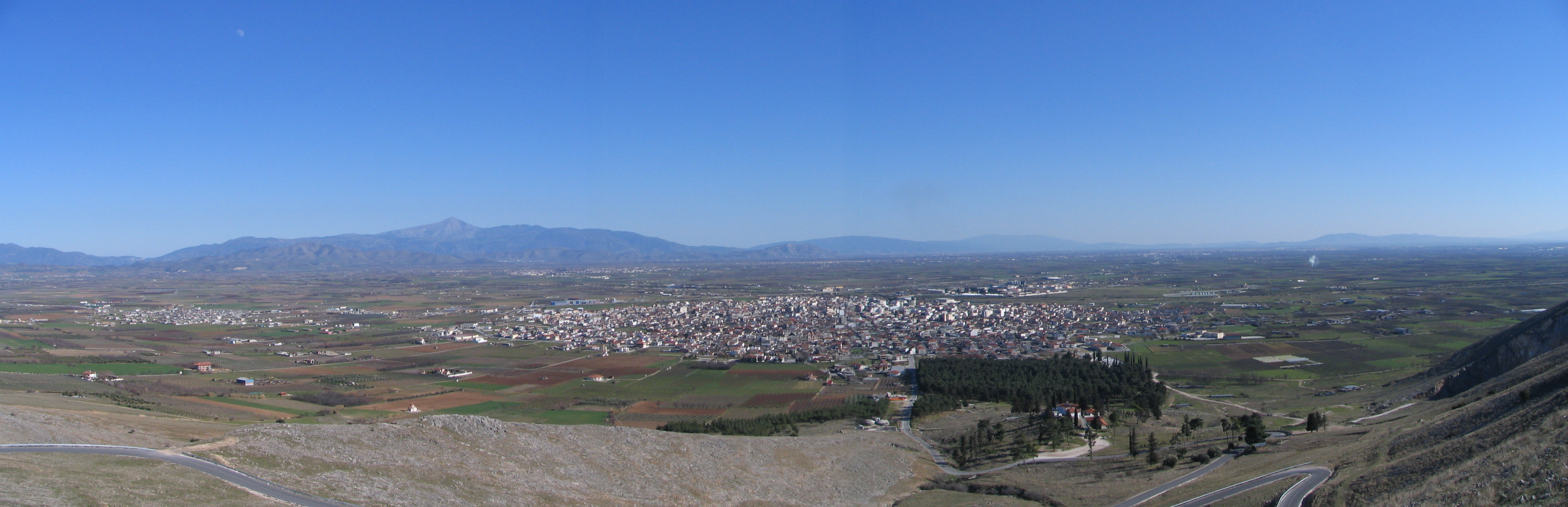

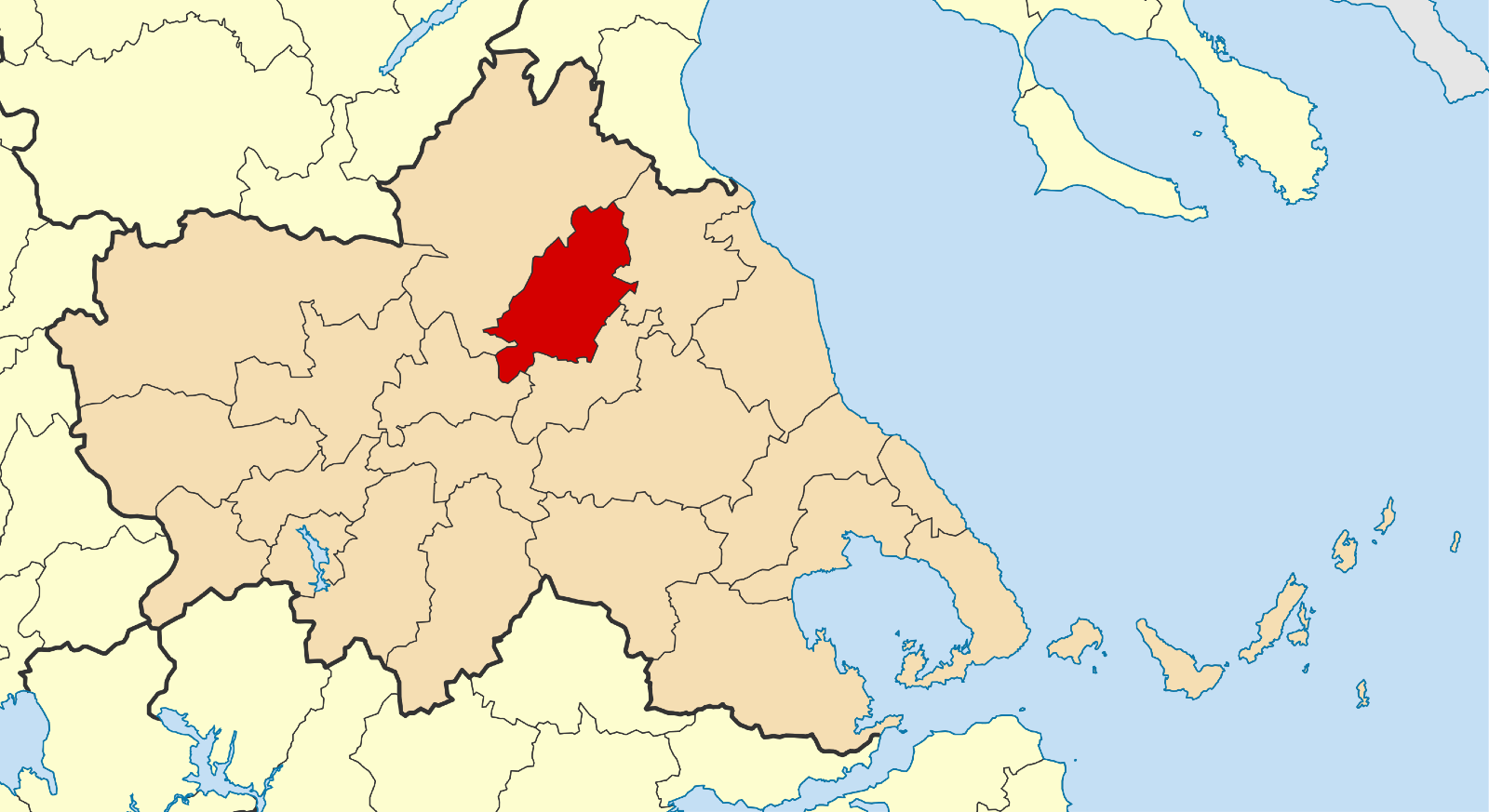

- Location within Greece
- Coordinates: 39°44′N 22°17′E
- Country: Greece
- Administrative region: Thessaly
- Regional unit: Larissa

Area
  - Municipality: 525.3 km^{2} (202.8 sq mi)
  - Municipal unit: 370.56 km^{2} (143.07 sq mi)

Population (2021)
  - Municipality: 22,280
  - Density: 42.41/km^{2} (109.9/sq mi)
  - Municipal unit: 15,023
  - Municipal unit density: 40.541/km^{2} (105.00/sq mi)
  - Community: 11,210
- Time zone: UTC+2 (EET)
  - Summer (DST): UTC+3 (EEST)
- Postal code: 401 00
- Vehicle registration: ΡΙ
- Website: www.tirnavos.gr

Tyrnavos (Greek: Τύρναβος, romanized: Týrnavos) is a town and a municipality in the Larissa regional unit of the Thessaly region of Greece. According to the 2021 census, the municipality has a population of 22,280, of whom 11,210 live within the town of Tyrnavos, making it the second-largest town in the regional unit. The river Titarisios, a tributary of the Pineios, flows through the town.

== History ==
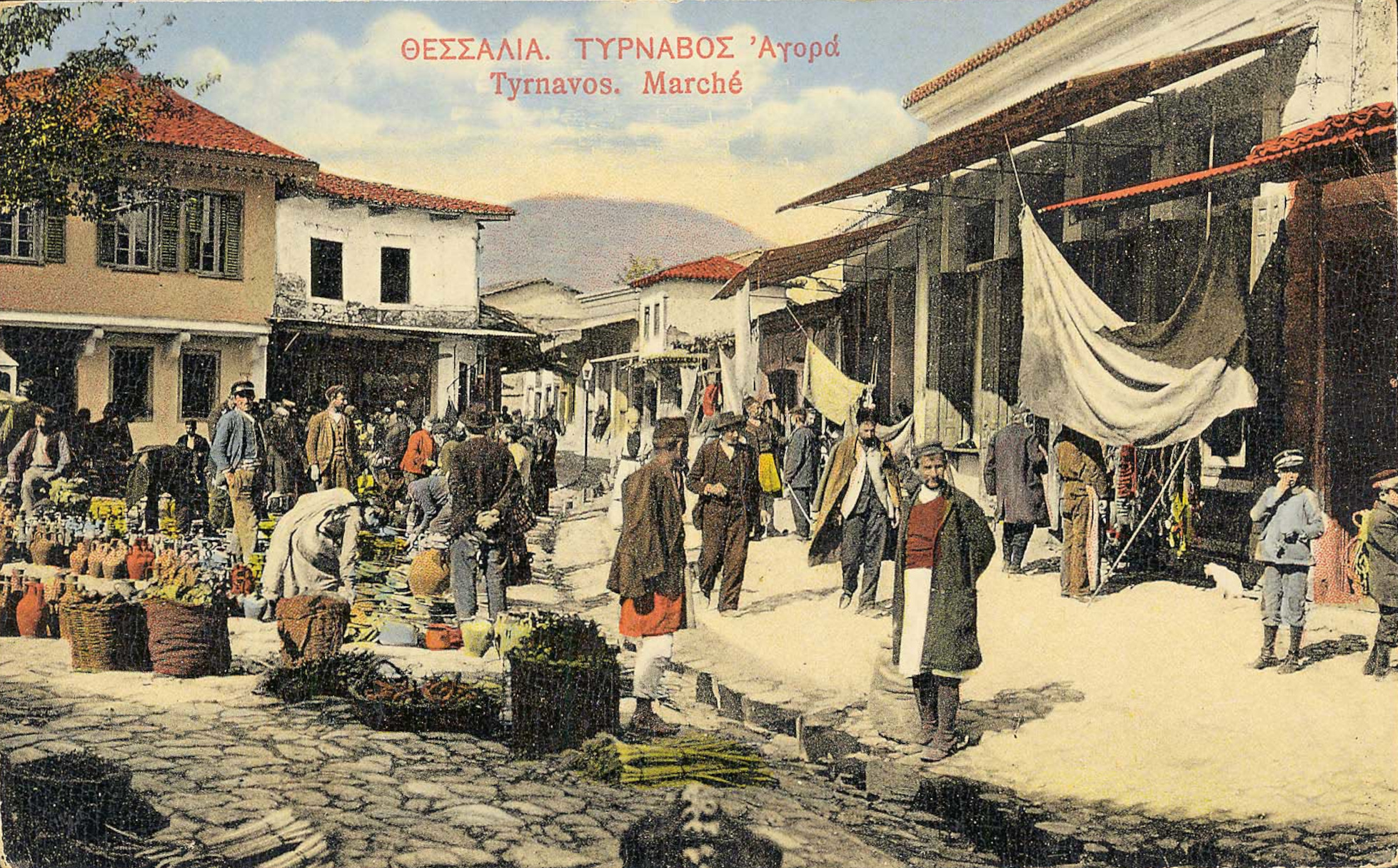
The market of Tyrnavos depicted on a postcard, c. 1910

Tyrnavos was first established by the Slavs as a pastoral settlement with huts in the 7th or 8th century AD. Its name is derived from the Slavic name Trnovo, a common place name throughout the Balkans meaning "place of thorns". In 1423 the Turkish general Turahan Bey conquered Thessaly. Turahan re-founded Tyrnavos as a formal urban center, gathering the local inhabitants and settling them in the new town, which he adorned with several buildings and which he granted extensive privileges. In 1770 there were 16 churches and 6 mosques in the town. Following the Convention of Constantinople in 1881, Greece annexed Tyrnavos along with the rest of Thessaly. Some Ottoman-era buildings have been preserved, most notably the hammam. On March 3, 2021, a 6.3 earthquake struck the region of Thessaly between the towns of Elassona and Tyrnavos. At least a hundred homes and other buildings in the area, including churches, were damaged. A disabled man was rescued with serious head injuries after being trapped in his house in the village of Mesochori and 10 other people were slightly injured.

== Culture ==
The city holds a famous annual carnival, which has its roots in antiquity. It is at least 100 years old. The first written records about its celebration date from 1898.

In the early 20th century, the carnival of Tyrnavos has been the target of bitter criticism and successive attacks by the governments of that time that regarded it as an offence against the moral standards of people. However, the prohibition of the carnival didn't intimidate the inhabitants of Tyrnavos that celebrated it even secretly.

After the war, disguised people are incorporated into the carnival chariots. However, the dictatorship prohibited it once more and its celebration was interrupted until 1980 when the custom was revised. In recent years, the carnival of Tyrnavos is renowned as the biggest and best carnival in Central Greece. The carnival is celebrated during about a month, but the festivities culminate on the last Sunday of carnival with the big Parade of chariots, with the participation of thousands people.

The custom of "Burani" takes place on the day of (Clean Monday), the first days of Lent. This customs have made Tyrnavos famous. Shrove Monday is a day of merry moral freedom or laxity of morals during which the rules of decent behavior are temporarily violated. The use of sexual and love symbols are combined with the traditional folk manifestations. Strictly speaking, the "bourani" is a folk fare but in essence, it is a phallus festival that symbolizes the reproduction and fertility. First, the inhabitants of the town go to the country church of Prophet Elijah in a free wide area, in the north of the town. Each group spread a table with various dishes on the ground and a big flagon of wine or "ouzo" or "tsipouro" with water.

At the same time, they lit a fire on which they prepared the "Bourani", a spinach soup. After the "Bourani" had been served to the "initiates", people started dancing, singing, joking and teasing each other using obscene language. Everyone who passes by must stop and stir the soup with a long wooden ladle of a particular shape, take a sip of soup straight from the ladle and then drink a shot of tsipouro from a ceramic phallic-shaped tumbler. Next to the cauldron, there is a rocking throne in the shape of a phallus, which attracts flocks of laughing festivalgoers.

A lot of men that participated in this ritual held phalluses as scepters in their hands. The phalluses were made of wood or clay or even of bread and constituted the most important ceremonial symbol. In the late seventies, women started taking an active part in the entire ritual especially after the creation of the "Bourani Society" in 1979.

This pagan fertility festival in honour of the god Dionysus marks the beginning of the Greek Orthodox fasting period before Easter. Due to the intense pagan roots of the festival and its irreverence, the Greek Orthodox Church does not approve of the event.

=== Dialect ===
Tyrnavos has its own dialect, one of the features is Standard Modern Greek /jo/ being realized as /y/.

== Municipality ==
The municipality Tyrnavos was formed at the 2011 local government reform by the merger of the following 2 former municipalities, that became municipal units:

- Ampelonas
- Tyrnavos

=== Subdivisions ===
The municipal unit of Tyrnavos is divided into the following communities (constituent settlements in brackets):

- Argyropouli (Argyropouli, Ano Argyropouleio, Votanochori)
- Damasi (Damasi, Damasouli)
- Dendra Tyrnavou (Dendra, Agia Sofia, Platanoulia)
- Tyrnavos (Tyrnavos, Kritiri, Lygaria, Perichora)

== Province ==
The province of Tyrnavos (Greek: Επαρχία Τυρνάβου) was one of the provinces of the Larissa Prefecture. Its territory corresponded with that of the current municipality Tyrnavos and the municipal units Giannouli, Gonnoi and Kato Olympos. It was abolished in 2006.

== Historical population ==
Year	Town	Community	Municipal unit	Municipality
1981	11,118	-	-	-
1991	12,028	-	16,923	-
2001	11,116	12,451	16,900	-
2011	11,069	12,572	16,977	25,032
2021	10,027	11,210	15,023	22,280

== Geography ==
The municipality is made up of mountains covering the northern portion as well as grasslands. Farmlands dominate the southern portion in which is part of the Thessalian Plain and the Titarisios valley. Tyrnavos is a major wine producing center.

It is bypassed by the Greek National Road 3 (Larissa – Elassona – Kozani – Niki). Tyrnavos is located south-southwest of Thessaloniki and Katerini, northwest of Larissa, east-northeast of Trikala and south-southeast of Elassona and Kozani.

The municipality Tyrnavos has an area of 525.323 km^{2}, the municipal unit Tyrnavos has an area of 370.564 km^{2}, and the community Tyrnavos has an area of 79.109 km^{2}.

== Notable people ==
- Thanasis Papakonstantinou (1959) singer and songwriter
- Daniel, protopsaltis of the Ecumenical Patriarchate of Constantinople (18th century)
