= Kalkandere =

- Municipality
- Location within Turkey
- Coordinates: 40°55′41″N 40°26′31″E
- Country: Turkey
- Province: Rize
- District: Kalkandere

Government
  - Mayor: Kenan Yıldırım (AKP)
- Elevation: 130 m (430 ft)
- Population (2021): 6,871
- Time zone: UTC+3 (TRT)
- Area code: 0464
- Climate: Cfa
- Website: www.kalkandere.bel.tr

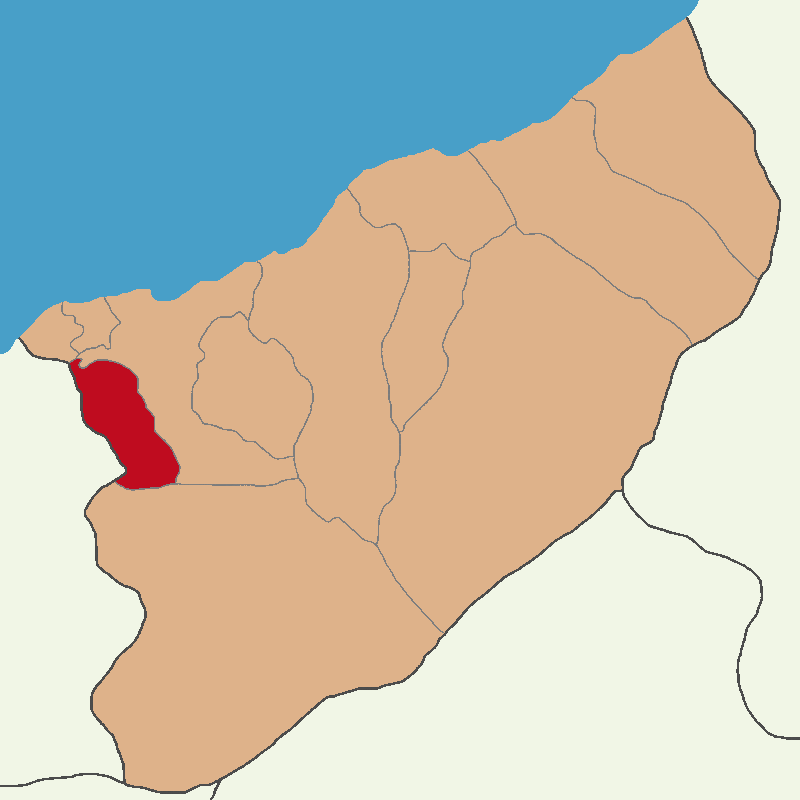
Kalkandere district center

Kalkandere is a town in Rize Province in the Black Sea region of Turkey, west of the city of Rize. It is the seat of Kalkandere District. Its population is 6,871 (2021).

Kalkandere is a small town providing public services to the surrounding area. There are primary schools in the villages but children must come into town for high school. There are tea processing plants in the town.

== History ==
See Rize Province for the history of this area.

== Places of interest ==
There is a picnic area on the road between Kalkandere and İkizdere.
