= Argyropouli =

Argyropouli Αργυροπούλι Caragioli
- Community
- Location within Greece
- Coordinates: 39°49.6′N 22°18.5′E
- Country: Greece
- Administrative region: Thessaly
- Regional unit: Larissa
- Municipality: Tyrnavos
- Municipal unit: Tyrnavos

Area
  - Community: 103.063 km^{2} (39.793 sq mi)
- Elevation: 147 m (482 ft)

Population (2021)
  - Community: 1,311
  - Density: 12.72/km^{2} (32.95/sq mi)
- Time zone: UTC+2 (EET)
  - Summer (DST): UTC+3 (EEST)
- Postal code: 401 00
- Area code: +30-2492
- Vehicle registration: PI

Argyropouli (Greek: Αργυροπούλι, Greek pronunciation: [aɾʝiɾo'puli], Aromanian: Caragioli) is an Aromanian (Vlach) village and a community of the Tyrnavos municipality. The community of Argyropouli covers an area of 103.063 km^{2}.

== Administrative division ==
The community of Argyropouli consists of three settlements:

- Ano Argyropouli (uninhabited)
- Argyropouli (population 1,302 in 2021)
- Votanochori (population 9)

== Population ==
Historical population
Year	Pop.	±%
2001	1,894	—
2011	1,670	−11.8%
2021	1,311	−21.5%

== See also ==
- List of settlements in the Larissa regional unit
