= Yamaks =

- Active: 1768–1804
- Allegiance: Ottoman Empire
- Type: Auxiliary force, made up of local Balkan Muslims
- Role: Garrison guard

Yamaks (Turkish: yamaklar) were auxiliary troops of the army of the Ottoman Empire raised from the local Muslim population. Initially they were non-military members of Ottoman forces who in later periods of the empire evolved into newly recruited janissary troops and eventually became ill-trained and ill-paid garrison guards.

The Turkish word yamak means "assistant" or "friend". This word is also used to denote a paid assistant of the craftsman. The Bosniak surname Jamaković is derived from the Ottoman term for "janissary recruit".

Initially, Yamaks were civilians who were mobilized for different tasks during wars or as volunteers who wanted to be recruited as janissaries. The Ottoman Empire had the practice to assign janissary forces to garrisons in borderland fortresses. Local craftsmen who associated with the janissaries were referred to as yamaks because they assisted janissaries. Eventually they became poorly paid and trained Muslim garrison guards, in particular at the garrisons at Bosphorus, Black Sea and Danube. That is why in some sources they are referred to as janissary border guards. In 1768, during mobilisation of troops for struggle against Russia, 1,000 yamaks were recruited in Sarajevo and dispatched against Montenegro, a Russian ally.

At the end of the 18th and beginning of the 19th century they became a source of unrest and resistance to reforms. There was a pattern which was repeated in the provincial garrisons. The number of yamaks who assisted the few active janissaries was growing because of the business opportunities this position provided. Soon their number would become too big for the garrison to support them, so many of them would move to the countryside to cause misery to peasants and landlords by instituting a reign of terror. Such yamaks followed their leaders called dahis and disobeyed the orders of state officials and even those of the sultan. This was basically the situation in Serbia at the beginning of the 19th century that led to the First Serbian Uprising (1804–13). The Sanjak of Smederevo (in modern-day Serbia) was governed by four Yamak commanders (the Dahije).

== See also ==
- Kabakçı Mustafa
