= Greek Muslims =

Ethnoreligious group

Έλληνες μουσουλμάνοι
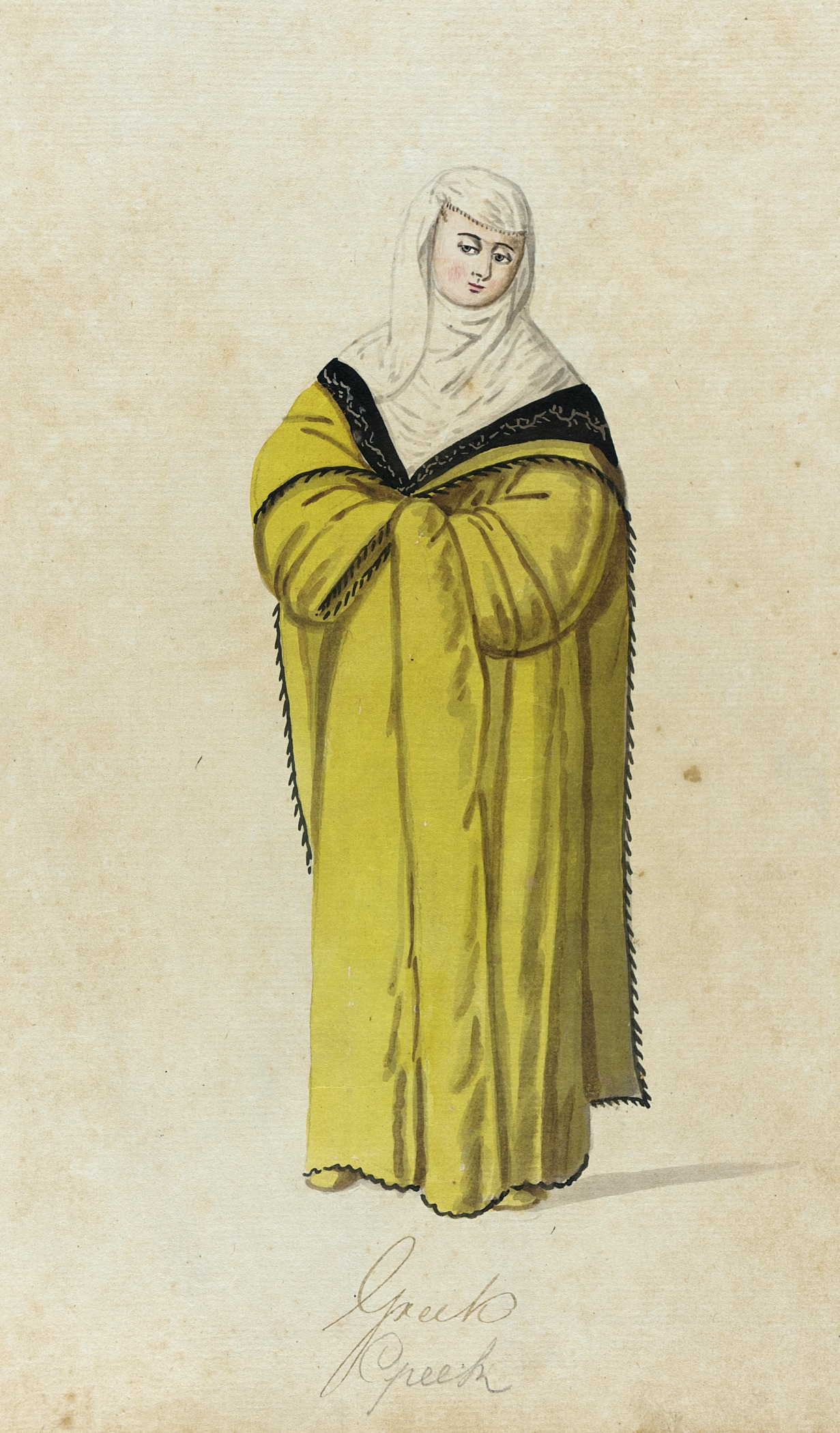
- Greek woman in hijab, Turkey, 1710

Regions with significant populations
- Turkey; Libya; Egypt; Palestine; Syria; Lebanon; Cyprus; Greece

Languages
- Historic: Greek (Pontic Greek, Cretan Greek, Cypriot Greek, Cappadocian Greek), Karamanli Turkish; Modern: Turkish, Arabic, Georgian, Russian

Religion
- Sunni Islam, some followed the Bektashi order

Related ethnic groups
- Other Greeks and Turks

Greek Muslims, also known as Grecophone Muslims, are Muslims of Greek ethnic origin whose adoption of Islam (and often the Turkish language and identity in more recent times) dates either from the contact of early Islamic caliphates with the Byzantine Empire or to the period of Ottoman rule in the southern Balkans and Anatolia. In more recent times, they consist primarily of descendants of Ottoman-era converts to Islam from Greek Macedonia (e.g., Vallahades), Crete (Cretan Muslims), and northeastern Anatolia (particularly in the regions of Trabzon, Gümüşhane, Sivas, Erzincan, Erzurum, and Kars).

Despite their ethnic Greek origin, the contemporary Grecophone Muslims of Turkey have been steadily assimilated into the Turkish-speaking Muslim population. Sizable numbers of Grecophone Muslims, not merely the elders but even young people, have retained knowledge of their respective Greek dialects, such as Cretan and Pontic Greek. Because of their gradual Turkification, as well as the close association of Greece and Greeks with Orthodox Christianity and their perceived status as a historic, military threat to the Turkish Republic, very few are likely to call themselves Greek Muslims. In Greece, Greek-speaking Muslims are not usually considered as forming part of the Greek nation.

In the late Ottoman period, particularly after the Greco-Turkish War (1897), several communities of Greek Muslims from Crete and southern Greece were also relocated to Libya, Lebanon, and Syria, where, in towns like al-Hamidiyah, some of the older generation continue to speak Greek. Historically, Greek Orthodoxy has been associated with being Romios (i.e., Greek) and Islam with being Turkish, despite ethnicity or language.

Most Greek-speaking Muslims in Greece left for Turkey during the 1920s population exchanges under the Convention Concerning the Exchange of Greek and Turkish Populations (in return for Turkish-speaking Christians such as the Karamanlides). Due to the historical role of the millet system, religion and not ethnicity or language was the main factor used during the exchange of populations. All Muslims who departed Greece were seen as "Turks," whereas all Orthodox people leaving Turkey were considered "Greeks," again regardless of their ethnicity or language. An exception was made for the native Muslim Pomaks and Western Thrace Turks living east of the River Nestos in East Macedonia and Thrace, Northern Greece, who are officially recognized as a religious minority by the Greek government.

In Turkey, where most Greek-speaking Muslims live, there are various groups of Grecophone Muslims, some autochthonous, and some from parts of present-day Greece and Cyprus.

== Motivations for conversion to Islam ==
=== Taxation ===
Dhimmi were subject to the heavier tax, jizya, versus the Muslim zakat. Other major taxes were the Defter and İspençe and the more severe Haraç, whereby a document was issued which stated that "the holder of this certificate is able to keep his head on the shoulders since he paid the Haraç tax for this year..." All these taxes were waived if the person converted to Islam.

=== Devşirme ===
Greek non-Muslims were also subjected to practices like Devşirme (blood tax), in which the Ottomans took Christian boys from their families and later converted them to Islam with the aim of selecting and training the ablest of them for leading positions in Ottoman society. Devşirme was not, however, the only means of conversion of Greek Christians. Many male and female orphans voluntarily converted to Islam in order to be adopted or to serve near Turkish families.

=== Legal system ===
Another benefit converts received was better legal protection. The Ottoman Empire had two separate court systems, Islamic and non-Islamic, with the decisions of the former superseding those of the latter. Because non-Muslims were forbidden in the Islamic court, they could not defend their cases and were doomed to lose every time.

=== Career opportunities ===
Conversion also yielded greater employment prospects and possibilities of advancement in the Ottoman government bureaucracy and military. Subsequently, these people became part of the Muslim community of the millet system, which was closely linked to Islamic religious rules. At that time, people were bound to their millets by their religious affiliations (or their confessional communities), rather than by their ethnic origins. Muslim communities prospered under the Ottoman Empire, and as Ottoman law did not recognize such notions as ethnicity, Muslims of all ethnic backgrounds enjoyed precisely the same rights and privileges.

=== Avoiding slavery ===
During the Greek War of Independence, Ottoman Egyptian troops under the leadership of Ibrahim Pasha of Egypt ravaged the island of Crete and the Greek countryside of the Morea, where Muslim Egyptian soldiers enslaved vast numbers of Christian Greek children and women. Ibrahim arranged for the enslaved Greek children to be forcefully converted to Islam en masse. The enslaved Greeks were subsequently transferred to Egypt, where they were sold. Several decades later in 1843, the English traveler and writer Sir John Gardner Wilkinson described the state of enslaved Greeks who had converted to Islam in Egypt:

White Slaves – In Egypt there are white slaves and slaves of colour. [...] There are [for example] some Greeks who were taken in the War of Independence. [...] In Egypt, the officers of rank are for the most part enfranchised slaves. I have seen in the bazars of Cairo Greek slaves who had been torn from their country, at the time it was about to obtain its liberty; I have seen them afterwards holding nearly all the most important civil and military grades; and one might be almost tempted to think that their servitude was not a misfortune, if one could forget the grief of their parents on seeing them carried off, at a time when they hoped to bequeath to them a religion free from persecution, and a regenerated country.

—

A great many Greeks and Slavs became Muslims to avoid these hardships. Conversion to Islam is quick, and the Ottoman Empire did not keep extensive documentation on the religions of their individual subjects. The only requirements were knowing Turkish, saying you were Muslim, and possibly getting circumcised. Converts might also signal their conversion by wearing the brighter clothes favored by Muslims, rather than the drab garments of Christians and Jews in the empire.

Greek has a specific verb, τουρκεύω (tourkevo), meaning "to become a Turk." The equivalent in Serbian and other South Slavic languages is turčiti (imperfective) or poturčiti (perfective).

== Greek Muslims of Pontus and the Caucasus ==
=== Geographic dispersal ===
Pontic Greek (called Ρωμαίικα/Roméika in the Pontus, not Ποντιακά/Pontiaká as it is in Greece), is spoken by large communities of Pontic Greek Muslim origin, spread out near the southern Black Sea coast. Pontian Greek Muslims are found within Trabzon province in the following areas:

- In the town of Tonya and in six villages of Tonya district.
- In six villages of the municipal entity of Beşköy in the central and Köprübaşı districts of Sürmene.
- In nine villages of the Galyana valley in Maçka district. These Greek Muslims were resettled there in abandoned former Greek Orthodox Pontian dwellings from the area of Beşköy after a devastating flood in 1929.
- In the Of valley, which contains the largest cluster of Pontian speakers.
- There are 23 Greek Muslim villages in Çaykara district, though due to migration these numbers have fluctuated; according to native speakers of the area, there were around 70 Greek Muslim villages in Çaykara district.
- Twelve Greek Muslim villages are also located in the Dernekpazarı district.
- In other settlements such as Rize (with a large concentration in İkizdere and Kalkandere district), Erzincan, Gümüşhane, parts of Erzerum province, and the former Russian Empire's province of Kars Oblast (see Caucasus Greeks) and Georgia (see Islam in Georgia).

Today these Greek-speaking Muslims regard themselves and identify as Turks. Nonetheless, a great many have retained knowledge of and/or are fluent in Greek, which continues to be a mother tongue for even young Pontic Muslims. Men are usually bilingual in Turkish and Pontic Greek, while many women are monolingual Pontic Greek speakers.

=== History ===
Many Pontic natives were converted to Islam during the first two centuries following the Ottoman conquest of the region. Taking high military and religious posts in the empire, their elite were integrated into the ruling class of imperial society. The converted population accepted Ottoman identity, but in many instances people retained their local, native languages. In 1914, according to the official estimations of the Ecumenical Patriarchate, about 190,000 Greek Muslims were counted in the Pontus alone. Over the years, heavy emigration from the Trabzon region to other parts of Turkey, to places such as Istanbul, Sakarya, Zonguldak, Bursa and Adapazarı, has occurred. Emigration out of Turkey has also occurred, such as to Germany as guest workers during the 1960s.

=== Glossonyms ===
In Turkey, Pontic Greek Muslim communities are sometimes called Rum. However, as with Yunan (Turkish for "Greek") or the English word "Greek," this term 'is associated in Turkey to be with Greece and/or Christianity, and many Pontic Greek Muslims refuse such identification. The endonym for Pontic Greek is Romeyka, while Rumca and/or Rumcika are Turkish exonyms for all Greek dialects spoken in Turkey. Both are derived from ρωμαίικα, literally "Roman", referring to the Byzantines. Modern-day Greeks call their language ελληνικά (Hellenika), meaning Greek, an appellation that replaced the previous term Romeiika in the early 19th century. In Turkey, standard modern Greek is called Yunanca; ancient Greek is called either Eski Yunanca or Grekçe.

=== Religious practice ===
According to Heath W. Lowry's seminal work on Ottoman tax books (Tahrir Defteri, with co-author Halil İnalcık), most "Turks" in Trebizond and the Pontic Alps region in northeastern Anatolia are of Pontic Greek origin. Pontian Greek Muslims are known in Turkey for their conservative adherence to Sunni Islam of the Hanafi school and are renowned for producing many Quranic teachers. Sufi orders such as Qadiri and Naqshbandi have a great impact.

== Cretan Muslims ==
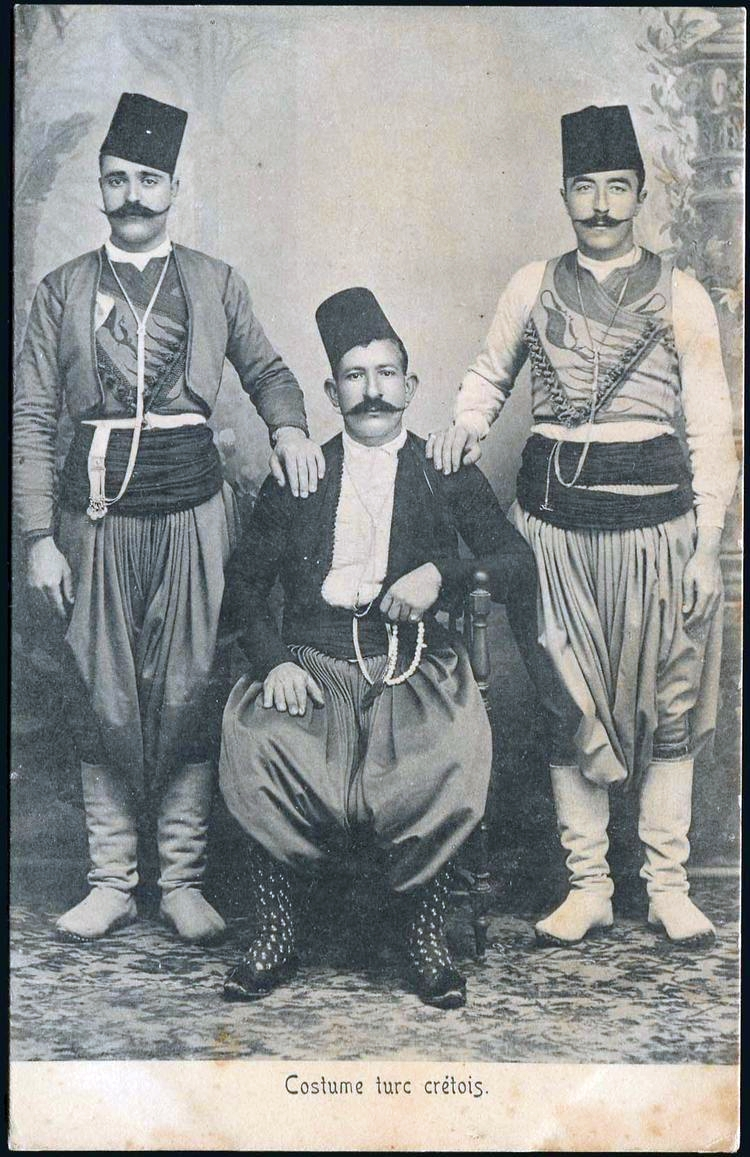
Cretan Muslims, 19th-20th century.

The term "Cretan Muslims" (Turkish: Girit Müslümanları) or "Cretan Turks" (Greek: Τουρκοκρητικοί; Turkish: Girit Türkleri) refers to Greek-speaking Muslims who arrived in Turkey after or slightly before the start of the Greek rule in Crete in 1908, and especially in the context of the 1923 agreement for the Exchange of Greek and Turkish Populations. Prior to their resettlement in Turkey, deteriorating communal relations between Cretan Greek Christians and Cretan Greek Muslims drove the latter to identify with Ottoman and later Turkish identity.

=== Geographic dispersal ===
Cretan Muslims have largely settled on the coastline, stretching from the Çanakkale to İskenderun. Significant numbers were resettled in other Ottoman-controlled areas around the eastern Mediterranean by the Ottomans following the establishment of the autonomous Cretan State in 1898. Most ended up in coastal Syria and Lebanon, particularly the town of Al-Hamidiyah, in Syria, (named after the Ottoman sultan who settled them there), and Tripoli in Lebanon, where many continue to speak Greek as their mother tongue. Others were resettled in Ottoman Tripolitania, especially in the eastern cities like Susa and Benghazi, where they are distinguishable by their Greek surnames. Many of the older members of this last community still speak Cretan Greek in their homes.

A small community of Cretan Greek Muslims still resides in Greece in the Dodecanese islands of Rhodes and Kos. These communities were formed prior to the area becoming part of Greece in 1948, when their ancestors migrated there from Crete, and their members are integrated into the local Muslim population as Turks today.

=== Language ===
Some Grecophone Muslims of Crete composed literature for their community in the Greek language, such as songs, but wrote it in the Arabic alphabet. although little of it has been studied.

Today, in various settlements along the Aegean coast, elderly Grecophone Cretan Muslims are still conversant in Cretan Greek. Many in the younger generations are fluent in the Greek language.

Often, members of the Muslim Cretan community are unaware that the language they speak is Greek. Frequently, they refer to their native tongue as Cretan (Kritika Κρητικά or Giritçe) instead of Greek.

=== Religious practice ===
Cretan Greek Muslims are Sunnis of the Hanafi school, with a highly influential Bektashi minority who helped shape the folk Islam and religious tolerance of the entire community.

== Epirote Greek Muslims ==
Muslims from the region of Epirus, known collectively as Yanyalılar (singular Yanyalı, meaning "person from Ioannina") in Turkish and Τουρκογιαννιώτες Turkoyanyótes in Greek (singular Τουρκογιαννιώτης Turkoyanyótis, meaning "Turk from Ioannina") arrived in Turkey in two waves of migration, in 1912 and after 1923. After the exchange of populations, Grecophone Epirote Muslims resettled themselves in the Anatolian section of Istanbul, especially the districts from Erenköy to Kartal, which had previously been populated by wealthy Orthodox Greeks. Although the majority of the Epirote Muslim population was of Albanian origins, Grecophone Muslim communities existed in the towns of Souli, Margariti (both majority-Muslim), Ioannina, Preveza, Louros, Paramythia, Konitsa, and elsewhere in the Pindus mountain region. The Greek-speaking Muslim populations who were a majority in Ioannina and Paramythia, with sizable numbers residing in Parga and possibly Preveza, "shared the same route of identity construction, with no evident differentiation between them and their Albanian-speaking cohabitants."

Hoca Sadeddin Efendi, a Greek-speaking Muslim from Ioannina in the 18th century, was the first translator of Aristotle into Turkish. Some Grecophone Muslims of Ioannina composed literature for their community in the Greek language, such as poems, using the Arabic alphabet. The community now is fully integrated into Turkish culture. Last, the Muslims from Epirus that were of mainly Albanian origin are described as Cham Albanians instead.

== Macedonian Greek Muslims ==
The Greek-speaking Muslims who lived in the Haliacmon of western Macedonia were known collectively as Vallahades; they had probably converted to Islam en masse in the late 1700s. The Vallahades retained much of their Greek culture and language. This is in contrast with most Greek converts to Islam from Greek Macedonia, other parts of Macedonia, and elsewhere in the southern Balkans, who generally adopted the Turkish language and identity and thoroughly assimilated into the Ottoman ruling elite. According to Todor Simovski's assessment (1972), 13,753 Muslim Greeks lived in Greek Macedonia in 1912.

In the 20th century, the Vallahades were considered by other Greeks to have become Turkish and were not exempt from the 1922–1923 population exchange between Greece and Turkey. The Vallahades were resettled in western Asia Minor, in such towns as Kumburgaz, Büyükçekmece, and Çatalca or in villages like Honaz near Denizli. Many Vallahades still continue to speak the Greek language, which they call Romeïka and have become completely assimilated into the Turkish Muslim mainstream as Turks.

== Thessalian Greek Muslims ==
Greek-speaking Muslims lived in Thessaly, mostly centered in and around cities such as Larissa, Trikala, Karditsa, Almyros, and Volos.

Grecophone Muslim communities existed in the towns and certain villages of Elassona, Tyrnovos, and Almyros. According to Lampros Koutsonikas, Muslims in the kaza of Elassona lived in six villages such as Stefanovouno, Lofos, Galanovrysi and Domeniko, as well as the town itself and belonged to the Vallahades group. Evliya Chelebi, who visited the area in 1660s, also mentioned in his Seyahâtnâme that they spoke Greek. In the 8th volume of his Seyahâtnâme he mentions that many Muslims of Thessaly were converts of Greek origin. In particular, he writes that the Muslims of Tyrnovos were converts, and that he could not understand the sect to which the of Muslims of Domokos belonged, claiming they were mixed with "infidels" and thus relieved of paying the haraç tax . Moreover, Chelebi does not mention at all the 12 so-called Konyar Turkish villages that are mentioned in the 18th-century Menâkıbnâme of Turahan Bey, such as Lygaria, Fallani, Itea, Gonnoi, Krokio and Rodia, which were referenced by Ottoman registrars in the yearly books of 1506, 1521. and 1570. This indicates that the Muslims of Thessaly are indeed mostly of convert origin. There were also some Muslims of Vlach descent assimilated into these communities, such as those in the village of Argyropouli. After the Convention of Constantinople in 1881, these Muslims started emigrating to areas that are still under Turkish administration including to the villages of Elassona.

Artillery captain William Martin Leake wrote in his Travels in Northern Greece (1835) that he spoke with the Bektashi Sheikh and the Vezir of Trikala in Greek. In fact, he specifically states that the Sheikh used the word "ἄνθρωπος" to define men, and he quotes the Vezir as saying, καί έγώ εϊμαι προφήτης στά Ιωάννινα.. British Consul-General John Elijah Blunt observed in the last quarter of the 19th century, "Greek is also generally spoken by the Turkish inhabitants, and appears to be the common language between Turks and Christians."

Research on purchases of property and goods registered in the notarial archive of Agathagellos Ioannidis between 1882 and 1898, right after the annexation, concludes that the overwhelming majority of Thessalian Muslims who became Greek citizens were able to speak and write Greek. An interpreter was needed only in 15% of transactions, half of which involved women, which might indicate that most Thessalian Muslim women were monolingual and possibly illiterate. However, a sizable population of Circassians and Tatars were settled in Thessaly in the second half of the 19th century, in the towns of Yenişehir (Larissa), Velestino, Ermiye (Almyros), and villages of Balabanlı (Asimochori) and Loksada in Karditsa. It is possible that they and also the Albanian Muslims were the ones who did not fully understand the Greek Language. Moreover, some Muslims served as interpreters in these transactions.

== Greek Morean/Peleponnesian Muslims ==
Greek-speaking Muslims lived in cities, citadels, towns, and some villages close to fortified settlements in the Peloponnese, such as Patras, Rio, Tripolitsa, Koroni, Navarino, and Methoni. Evliya Chelebi has also mentioned in his Seyahatnâme that the language of all Muslims in Morea was Urumşa, which is demotic Greek. In particular, he mentions that the wives of Muslims in the castle of Acrocorinth were non-Muslims. He says that the peoples of Gastouni speak Urumşa, but that they were devout and friendly nonetheless. He explicitly states that the Muslims of Longanikos were converted Greeks, or ahıryan.

== Greek Cypriot Muslims ==
In 1878 the Muslim inhabitants of Cyprus constituted about one-third of the island's population of 120,000. They were classified as being either Turkish or "neo-Muslim." The latter were of Greek origin, Islamised but speaking Greek, and similar in character to the local Christians. The last of such groups was reported to arrive at Antalya in 1936. These communities are thought to have abandoned Greek in the course of integration. During the 1950s, there were still four Greek speaking Muslim settlements in Cyprus: Lapithiou, Platanissos, Ayios Simeon and Galinoporni that identified themselves as Turks. A 2017 study on the genetics of Turkish Cypriots has shown strong genetic ties with their fellow Orthodox Greek Cypriots.

== Greek Muslims of the Aegean Islands ==
Despite not having a majority Muslim population at any time during the Ottoman period, some Aegean Islands such as Chios, Lesbos, Kos, Rhodes, Lemnos and Tenedos, and on Kastellorizo contained a sizable Muslim population of Greek origin. Before the Greek Revolution, there were also Muslims on the island of Euboea, but there were no Muslims in the Cyclades and Sporades island groups. Evliya Chelebi mentions that there were 100 Muslim houses on the island of Aegina in 1660s. On most islands, Muslims were only living in and around the main centers of the islands. Today, about 5,000–5,500 Greek-speaking Muslims (called Turks of the Dodecanese) live on Kos and Rhodes. This is because the Dodecanese islands were governed by Italy during the Greek-Turkish population exchange, and so these populations were exempt. However, many migrated after the Paris Peace Treaties in 1947.

== Crimea ==
In the Middle Ages the Greek population of Crimea traditionally adhered to Eastern Orthodox Christianity, even despite undergoing linguistic assimilation by the local Crimean Tatars. In 1777–1778, when Catherine the Great of Russia conquered the peninsula from the Ottoman Empire, the local Orthodox population was forcibly deported and settled north of the Azov Sea. In order to avoid deportation, some Greeks chose to convert to Islam. Crimean Tatar-speaking Muslims of the village of Kermenchik (renamed to Vysokoye in 1945) kept their Greek identity and were practicing Christianity in secret for a while. In the nineteenth century the lower half of Kermenchik was populated with Christian Greeks from Turkey, whereas the upper remained Muslim. By the time of the 1944 deportation, the Muslims of Kermenchik had already been identified as Crimean Tatars, and were forcibly expelled to Central Asia together with the rest of Crimea's ethnic minorities.

== Lebanon and Syria ==
There are about 7,000 Greek-speaking Muslims living in Tripoli, Lebanon and about 8,000 in Al Hamidiyah, Syria. The majority of them are Muslims of Cretan origin. Records suggest that the community left Crete between 1866 and 1897, on the outbreak of the last Cretan uprising against the Ottoman Empire, which ended the Greco-Turkish War of 1897. Sultan Abdul Hamid II provided Cretan Muslim families who fled the island with refuge on the Levantine coast. The new settlement was named Hamidiye after the sultan.

Many Grecophone Muslims of Lebanon somewhat managed to preserve their Cretan Muslim identity and Greek language. Unlike neighbouring communities, they are monogamous and consider divorce a disgrace. Until the Lebanese Civil War, their community was close-knit and entirely endogamous. However many of them left Lebanon during the 15 years of the war.

Greek-speaking Muslims constitute 60% of Al Hamidiyah's population. The percentage may be higher but is not conclusive because of hybrid relationship in families. The community is very much concerned with maintaining its culture. The knowledge of the spoken Greek language is remarkably good and their contact with their historical homeland has been possible by means of satellite television and relatives. They are also known to be monogamous. Today, Grecophone Hamidiyah residents identify themselves as Cretan Muslims, while some others as Cretan Turks.

By 1988, many Grecophone Muslims from both Lebanon and Syria had reported being subject to discrimination by the Greek embassy because of their religious affiliation. The community members would be regarded with indifference and even hostility, and would be denied visas and opportunities to improve their Greek through trips to Greece.

== Central Asia ==
In the Middle Ages, after the Seljuq victory over the Byzantine Emperor Romanus IV, many Byzantine Greeks were taken as slaves to Central Asia. The most famous among them was Al-Khazini, a Byzantine Greek slave taken to Merv, then in the Khorasan province of Persia but now in Turkmenistan, who later converted to Islam, was freed and became a famous Muslim scientist.

== Other Greek Muslims ==
- Greek-speaking Muslims of Anatolia
- Greek-speaking Muslims of Thrace
- Greek-speaking Muslims of North Africa

== Muslims of partial Greek descent (non-conversions) ==
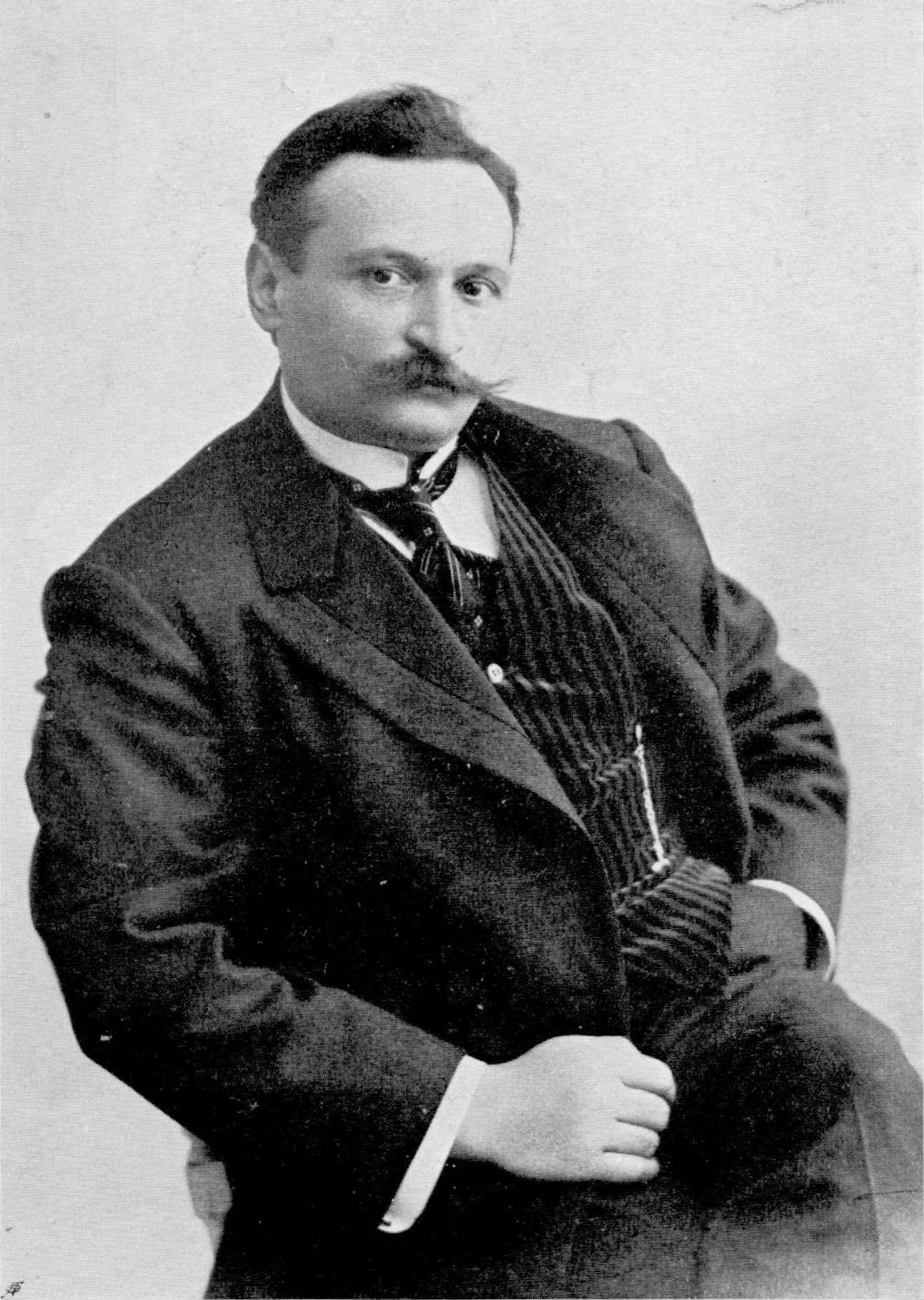
Tevfik Fikret (1867–1915) was an Ottoman poet who is considered the founder of the modern school of Turkish poetry, his mother was a Greek convert to Islam from Chios.

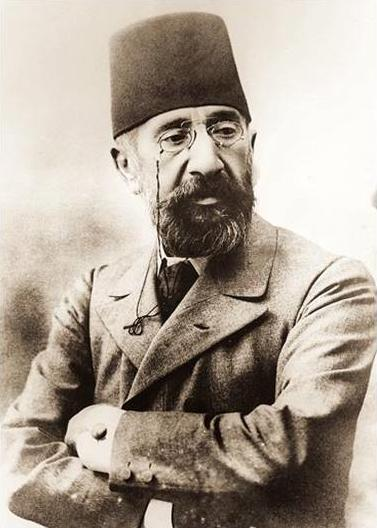
Osman Hamdi Bey (1842–1910) was an Ottoman statesman, archaeologist, intellectual, art expert and pioneering painter of Greek descent. He was the founder of Istanbul Archaeology Museums and of Istanbul Academy of Fine Arts (Turkish: Sanayi-i Nefise Mektebi), today known as the Mimar Sinan Fine Arts University.

- Abu Ubaid al-Qasim bin Salam al-Khurasani al-Harawi (Arabic: أبو عبيد القاسم بن سلاّم الخراساني الهروي; c. 770–838) was an Arab philologist and the author of many standard works on lexicography, Qur'anic sciences, hadith, and fiqh. He was born in Herat, the son of a Byzantine Greek slave. He left his native town and studied philology in Basra under many famous scholars such as al-Asmaʿi (d. 213/828), Abu ʿUbayda (d. c.210/825), and Abu Zayd al-Ansari (d. 214 or 215/830–1), and in Kufa under, among others, Abu ʿAmr al-Shaybani (d. c.210/825), al-Kisaʾi (d. c.189/805) and others.
- Abu Firas al-Hamdani, Al-Harith ibn Abi'l-ʿAlaʾ Saʿid ibn Hamdan al-Taghlibi (932–968), better known by his nom de plume of Abu Firas al-Hamdani (Arabic: أبو فراس الحمداني), was an Arab prince and poet. He was a cousin of Sayf al-Dawla and a member of the noble family of the Hamdanids, who were rulers in northern Syria and Upper Mesopotamia during the 10th century. He served Sayf al-Dawla as governor of Manbij as well as court poet, and was active in his cousin's wars against the Byzantine Empire. He was captured by the Byzantines in 959/962 and spent four or seven years at their capital, Constantinople, where he composed his most famous work, the collection of poems titled al-Rūmiyyāt (الروميات). His father Abi'l-Ala Sa'id—a son of the Hamdanid family's founder, Hamdan ibn Hamdun – occupied a distinguished position in the court of the Abbasid caliph al-Muqtadir (reigned 908–932). Abu Firas' mother was a Byzantine Greek slave concubine (an umm walad, freed after giving birth to her master's child). His maternal descent later was a source of scorn and taunts from his Hamdanid relatives, a fact reflected in his poems.
- Ibn al-Rumi (836–896), Arab poet, was the son of a Persian mother and a Byzantine freedman father and convert to Islam.
- Al-Wathiq – Abū Jaʿfar Hārūn ibn Muḥammad (Arabic: أبو جعفر هارون بن محمد 812–847;المعتصم), better known by his regnal name al-Wāthiq Bi'llāh (الواثق بالله, "He who trusts in God"), was an Abbasid caliph who reigned from 842 until 847 AD (227–232 AH in the Islamic calendar). Al-Wathiq was the son of al-Mu'tasim by a Byzantine Greek slave (umm walad), Qaratis. He was named Harun after his grandfather, caliph Harun al-Rashid (r. 786–809).
- Al-Muhtadi – Abū Isḥāq Muḥammad ibn al-Wāṯiq (c. 833–870), better known by his regnal name al-Muhtadī bi-'llāh (Arabic: المهتدي بالله, "Guided by God"), was the Caliph of the Abbasid Caliphate from July 869 to June 870, during the "Anarchy at Samarra". Al-Muhtadi's mother Qurb, was a Greek slave. As a ruler, al-Muhtadi sought to emulate the Umayyad caliph Umar ibn Abd al-Aziz, widely considered a model Islamic ruler. He therefore lived an austere and pious life—notably removing all musical instruments from the court—and made a point of presiding in person over the courts of grievances (mazalim), thus gaining the support of the common people. Combining "strength and ability", he was determined to restore the Caliph's authority and power, that had been eroded during the ongoing "Anarchy at Samarra" by the squabbles of the Turkish generals.
- Al-Mu'tadid, Abu'l-Abbas Ahmad ibn Talha al-Muwaffaq (Arabic: أبو العباس أحمد بن طلحة الموفق, translit. ʿAbū al-ʿAbbās Aḥmad ibn Ṭalḥa al-Muwaffaq; 854/861–902), better known by his regnal name al-Mu'tadid bi-llah (Arabic: المعتضد بالله, "Seeking Support in God") was the Caliph of the Abbasid Caliphate from 892 until his death in 902. Al-Mu'tadid was born Ahmad, the son of Talha, one of the sons of the Abbasid caliph al-Mutawakkil (r. 847–861), and a Greek slave named Dirar.
- Al-Husayn I ibn Ali, also known as Hussein I (Arabic: حسين الأول; b. 1675, d. 1740) founder of the Husainid Dynasty, which ruled Tunisia until the abolition of the monarchy in 1957. Husayn was born a Kouloughli, which is a term used to refer to an Ottoman father and a local North African mother. His father was a Muslim of Cretan Greek origin and his mother was a Tunisian. The Husaynids were often called "Greeks" by Habib Bourguiba and, until recently, discussion of their origins was taboo.
- Mahmoud Sami el-Baroudi (1839–1904), Prime Minister of Egypt from 4 February 1882 until 26 May 1882 and a prominent poet. He was known as Rab Alseif Wel Qalam رب السيف و القلم ("lord of sword and pen"). His father belonged to an Ottoman-Egyptian family while his mother was a Greek woman who converted to Islam upon marrying his father.
- Hussein Kamel of Egypt, Sultan Hussein Kamel (Arabic: السلطان حسين كامل, Turkish: Sultan Hüseyin Kamil Paşa; 1853–1917) was the Sultan of Egypt from 19 December 1914 to 9 October 1917, during the British protectorate over Egypt. Hussein Kamel was the second son of Khedive Isma'il Pasha, who ruled Egypt from 1863 to 1879 and his Greek wife Nur Felek Kadin.
- Mongi Slim (Arabic: منجي سليم, Turkish: Mengi Selim; 1908–1969) was a Tunisian diplomat who became the first African to become the President of the United Nations General Assembly in 1961. He received a degree from the faculty of law of the University of Paris. He was twice imprisoned by the French during the Tunisian struggle for independence. Slim came from an aristocratic family of Greek and Turkish origin. One of Slim's great-grandfathers, a Greek named Kafkalas, was captured as a boy by pirates, and sold to the Bey of Tunis, who educated and freed him and then made him his minister of defence.
- Kaykaus II, Seljuq sultan. His mother was the daughter of a Greek priest; and it was the Greeks of Nicaea from whom he consistently sought aid throughout his life.
- Kaykhusraw II – Ghiyath al-Din Kaykhusraw II or Ghiyāth ad-Dīn Kaykhusraw bin Kayqubād (Persian: غياث الدين كيخسرو بن كيقباد) was the sultan of Rûm from 1237 until his death in 1246. He ruled at the time of the Babai uprising and the Mongol invasion of Anatolia. He led the Seljuq army with its Christian allies at the Battle of Köse Dağ in 1243. He was the last of the Seljuq sultans to wield any significant power and died as a vassal of the Mongols. Kaykhusraw was the son of Kayqubad I and his wife Mah Pari Khatun, who was Greek by origin.
- Süleyman Pasha (1306–1357), was a son of the Ottoman sultan Orhan, and Nilüfer Hatun.
- Oruç Reis – also called Barbarossa or Redbeard (1470/1474–1518), privateer and Ottoman Bey (Governor) of Algiers and Beylerbey (Chief Governor) of the West Mediterranean. He was born on the island of Lesbos, his mother was Greek named Katerina.
- Hayreddin Barbarossa (c. 1478–1546), privateer and Ottoman admiral, whose mother Katerina, was a Greek from Mytilene on the island of Lesbos.
- Hasan Pasha (c. 1517–1572), son of Hayreddin Barbarossa, and three-times Beylerbey of Algiers, Algeria. He succeeded his father as ruler of Algiers, and replaced Barbarossa's deputy Hasan Agha who had been effectively holding the position of ruler of Algiers since 1533.
- Şehzade Halil (probably 1346–1362), Ottoman prince. His father was Orhan, the second bey of the Ottoman beylik (later empire), his mother was Theodora Kantakouzene, the daughter of the Byzantine emperor John VI Kantakouzenos and Irene Asanina. His kidnapping was an important event in 14th century Ottoman-Byzantine relations.
- Murad I (1326–1389), Ottoman sultan, Greek mother (Nilüfer Hatun) daughter of the Prince of Yarhisar or the Byzantine Princess Helen.
- Bayezid I (1360–1403), Ottoman sultan, Greek mother (Gülçiçek Hatun) wife of Murad I.
- Bayezid II (1447–1512), Ottoman sultan. The more widespread view is that his mother was of Albanian origin, though a Greek origin has also been proposed.
- Selim I (1470–1520), Ottoman sultan, there is a proposed Greek origin for his father, Bayezid II, through his mother's side (Valide Sultan Amina Gul-Bahar or Gulbahar Khatun – a Greek convert to Islam); and for his mother Gülbahar Hatun, which would make him three-quarters Greek if both are valid.
- Ahmed I (1590–1617), Ottoman sultan, Greek mother (Handan Sultan) wife of Mehmed III.
- Murad IV (1612–1640), Ottoman sultan, Greek mother (Kösem Sultan, originally Anastasia).
- Ibrahim I (1615–1648), Ottoman sultan, Greek mother (Kösem Sultan), the daughter of a priest from the island of Tinos; her maiden name was Anastasia and was one of the most powerful women in Ottoman history.
- Mustafa II (1664–1703), Ottoman sultan, Cretan Greek mother (Gülnuş Sultan, originally named Evemia).
- Ahmed III (1673–1736), Ottoman sultan, Cretan Greek mother (Gülnuş Sultan, originally named Evemia) who was the daughter of a Cretan Greek priest.
- Sheikh Bedreddin (1359–1420), influential mystic, scholar, theologian, and revolutionary, Greek mother named Melek Hatun.
- Osman Hamdi Bey (1842–1910), Ottoman statesman and art expert and also a prominent and pioneering painter, the son of İbrahim Edhem Pasha, a Greek by birth abducted as a youth following the Massacre of Chios. He was the founder of the Archaeological Museum of Istanbul.
- Tevfik Fikret (1867–1915), Ottoman poet who is considered the founder of the modern school of Turkish poetry, his mother was a Greek convert to Islam from the island of Chios.
- Taleedah Tamer is a Saudi Arabian fashion model. She is the first Saudi model to walk a couture runway in Paris and the first to be on the cover of an international magazine. Taleedah Tamer was born and raised in Jeddah, Makkah in the Kingdom of Saudi Arabia. Her father, Ayman Tamer, is a Saudi businessman who is CEO and chairman of Tamer Group, a pharmaceutical, healthcare, and beauty company. Her mother, Cristina Tamer, is an Italian former dancer and model for Giorgio Armani, Gianfranco Ferré and La Perla. Her grandmother is Greek.

== Muslims of Greek descent (non-conversions) ==
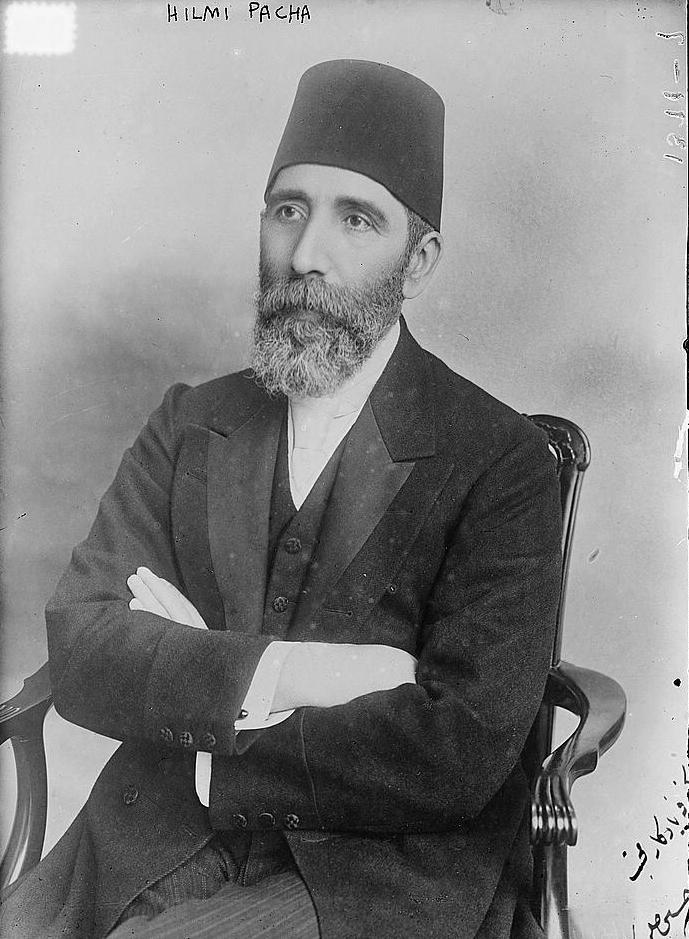
Hüseyin Hilmi Pasha (1855–1922–1923) was born into a Muslim family of Greek descent on Lesbos.

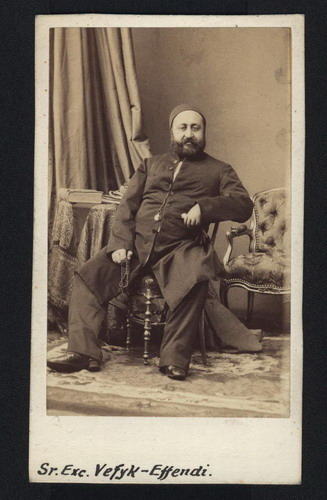
Ahmed Vefik Pasha (1823–1891) Ottoman statesman, diplomat and playwright of Greek ancestry who presided over the first Turkish parliament

- Hussein Hilmi Pasha – (1855–1922), Ottoman statesman born on Lesbos to a family of Greek ancestry who had formerly converted to Islam. He became twice Grand vizier of the Ottoman Empire in the wake of the Second Constitutional Era and was also co-founder and Head of the Turkish Red Crescent. Hüseyin Hilmi was one of the most successful Ottoman administrators in the Balkans of the early 20th century becoming Ottoman Inspector-General of Macedonia from 1902 to 1908, Ottoman Minister for the Interior from 1908 to 1909 and Ottoman Ambassador at Vienna from 1912 to 1918.
- Hadji Mustafa Pasha (1733–1801), of Greek Muslim origin, Ottoman commander.
- Ahmet Vefik Paşa (Istanbul, 3 July 1823 – 2 April 1891), was a famous Ottoman of Greek descent (whose ancestors had converted to Islam). He was a statesman, diplomat, playwright and translator of the Tanzimat period. He was commissioned with top-rank governmental duties, including presiding over the first Turkish parliament. He also became a grand vizier for two brief periods. Vefik also established the first Ottoman theatre and initiated the first Western style theatre plays in Bursa and translated Molière's major works.
- Ahmed Resmî Efendi (English, "Ahmed Efendi of Resmo") (1700–1783) also called Ahmed bin İbrahim Giridî ("Ahmed the son of İbrahim the Cretan") was a Grecophone Ottoman statesman, diplomat and historian, who was born into a Muslim family of Greek descent in the Cretan town of Rethymno. In international relations terms, his most important – and unfortunate – task was to act as the chief of the Ottoman delegation during the negotiations and the signature of the Treaty of Küçük Kaynarca. In the literary domain, he is remembered for various works among which his sefâretnâme recounting his embassies in Berlin and Vienna occupy a prominent place. He was Turkey's first ever ambassador in Berlin.
- Adnan Kahveci (1949–1993) was a noted Turkish politician who served as a key advisor to Prime Minister Turgut Özal throughout the 1980s. His family came from the region of Pontus and Kahveci was a fluent Greek speaker.
- Bülent Arınç (born. 25 May 1948) is a Deputy Prime Minister of Turkey since 2009. He is of Grecophone Cretan Muslim heritage with his ancestors arriving to Turkey as Cretan refugees during the time of Sultan Abdul Hamid II and is fluent in Cretan Greek. Arınç is a proponent of wanting to reconvert the Hagia Sophia into a mosque, which has caused diplomatic protestations from Greece.

== Greek converts to Islam ==
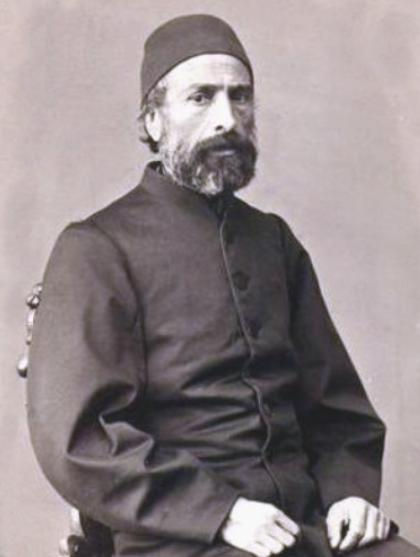
Ibrahim Edhem Pasha (1819–1893) was an Ottoman statesman of Greek origin.

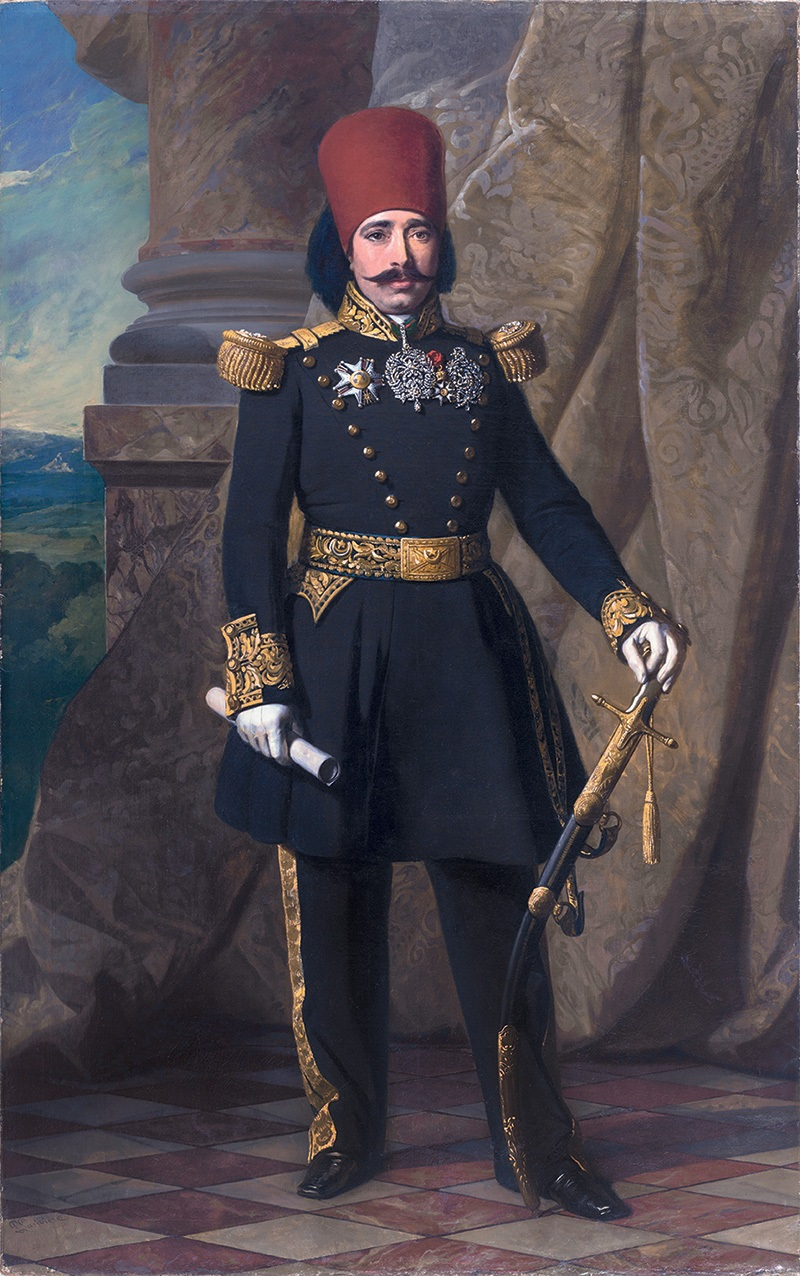
Mustapha Khaznadar (ca. 1817–1878) was a Muslim Greek who served as Prime Minister of Tunis.

- Al-Khazini – (flourished 1115–1130) was a Greek Muslim scientist, astronomer, physicist, biologist, alchemist, mathematician and philosopher – lived in Merv (modern-day Turkmenistan)
- Andreas Palaiologos or Palaeologus (Greek: Ἀνδρέας Παλαιολόγος; fl. 1520), sometimes anglicized to Andrew, was a son of Manuel Palaiologos. Andreas was likely named after his uncle, Manuel's brother, Andreas Palaiologos. Andreas's father had returned from exile under the protection of the Papacy to Constantinople in 1476 and had been generously provided for by Mehmed II of the Ottoman Empire, who had conquered the city from Manuel's relatives in 1453. Although Manuel remained a Christian until his death at some point before 1512, Andreas converted to Islam and served as an Ottoman court official under the name Mehmet Pasha. He was the last certain member of the imperial branch of the Palaiologos family.
- Atik Sinan or "Old Sinan" – Ottoman architect (not to be confused with the other Sinan whose origins are disputed between Greek, Albanian, Turk or Armenian (see below))
- Badr al-Hammami, Badr ibn ʿAbdallāh al-Ḥammāmī, also known as Badr al-Kabīr ("Badr the Elder"),[1] was a general who served the Tulunids and later the Abbasids. Of Greek origin, Badr was originally a slave of the founder of the Tulunid autonomous regime, Ahmad ibn Tulun, who later set him free. In 914, he was the Abbasid governor of Fars.
- Carlos Mavroleon – son of a Greek ship-owner, Etonian heir to a £100m fortune, close to the Kennedys and almost married a Heseltine, former Wall Street broker and a war correspondent, leader of an Afghan Mujahideen unit during the Afghan war against the Soviets – died under mysterious circumstances in Peshawar, Pakistan
- Damat Hasan Pasha, Ottoman Grand Vizier between 1703 and 1704. He was originally a Greek convert to Islam from the Morea.
- Damian of Tarsus – Damian (died 924), known in Arabic as Damyanah and surnamed Ghulam Yazman ("slave/page of Yazman"), was a Byzantine Greek convert to Islam, governor of Tarsus in 896–897 and one of the main leaders of naval raids against the Byzantine Empire in the early 10th century. In 911, he attacked Cyprus, which since the 7th century had been a neutralized Arab-Byzantine condominium, and ravaged it for four months because its inhabitants had assisted a Byzantine fleet under admiral Himerios in attacking the Caliphate's coasts the year before.
- Diam's (Mélanie Georgiades) French rapper of Greek origin.
- Dhuka al-Rumi lit. "Doukas the Roman" (died 11 August 919) was a Byzantine Greek who served the Abbasid Caliphate, most notably as governor of Egypt in 915–919. He was installed as governor of Egypt in 915 by the Abbasid commander-in-chief Mu'nis al-Muzaffar, as part of his effort to stabilize the situation in the country and expel a Fatimid invasion that had taken Alexandria.
- Emetullah Rabia Gülnûş Sultan (1642–1715) was the wife of Ottoman Sultan Mehmed IV and Valide Sultan to their sons Mustafa II and Ahmed III (1695–1715). She was born to a priest in Rethymno, Crete, then under Venetian rule, her maiden name was Evmania Voria and she was an ethnic Greek. She was captured when the Ottomans conquered Rethymno about 1646 and she was sent as slave to Constantinople, where she was given Turkish and Muslim education in the harem department of Topkapı Palace and soon attracted the attention of the Sultan, Mehmed IV.
- Evrenos (1288–1417) was an Ottoman military commander who served as a general under Süleyman Pasha, Murad I, Bayezid I, Süleyman Çelebi and Mehmed I. Legends stating that he lived for 129 years and had an incredibly long career are inaccurate. These sources of confusion may be linked to the deeds of his descendants becoming intertwined with his own achievements in historical retellings. He was also known as Gavrinos, and believed to descend from a Greek family. A Greek legend maintains that Evrenos' father was a certain Ornos, renegade Byzantine governor of Bursa (Prusa) who defected to the Ottomans, and then on to Karasi, after the Siege of Bursa, in 1326. Stanford J. Shaw states that Evrenos was originally a Byzantine Greek feudal prince in Anatolia who had entered Ottoman service following the capture of Bursa, converted to Islam, and later became a leading military commander under both Orhan and Murad I. Joseph von Hammer regarded Evrenos as simply a Byzantine Greek convert to Islam. Peter Sugar considers the family to be of Greek origin as well.
- Gawhar al-Siqilli, (born c. 928–930, died 992), of Greek descent originally from Sicily, who had risen to the ranks of the commander of the Fatimid armies. He had led the conquest of North Africa and then of Egypt and founded the city of Cairo and the great al-Azhar mosque.
- Hamza Tzortzis – Hamza Andreas Tzortzis is a British public speaker and researcher on Islam. A British Muslim convert of Greek heritage. In 2015 he was a finalist for Religious Advocate of the Year at the British Muslim Awards. Tzortzis has contributed to the BBC news programs: The Big Questions and Newsnight.
- Hamza Yusuf – American Islamic teacher and lecturer.
- Handan Sultan, wife of Ottoman Sultan Mehmed III
- Hass Murad Pasha was an Ottoman statesman and commander of Byzantine Greek origin. According to the 16th-century Ecthesis Chronica, Hass Murad and his brother, Mesih Pasha, were sons of a certain Gidos Palaiologos, identified by the contemporary Historia Turchesca as a brother of a Byzantine Emperor. This is commonly held to have been Constantine XI Palaiologos, the last Byzantine emperor, who fell during the fall of Constantinople to the Ottoman Sultan Mehmed II in 1453. If true, since Constantine XI died childless, and if the Ottomans had failed to conquer Constantinople, Mesih or Hass Murad might have succeeded him. The brothers were captured during the fall of Constantinople, converted to Islam, and raised as pages under the auspices of Sultan Mehmed II as part of the devşirme system.
- Ibrahim Edhem Pasha, born of Greek ancestry on the island of Chios, Ottoman statesman who held the office of Grand Vizier in the beginning of Abdulhamid II's reign between 5 February 1877 and 11 January 1878
- Ikhtiyar al-Din Hasan ibn Ghafras or Ikstiyar al-Din Hasan ibn Gavras (died 1192) was a courtier and long-time vizier of the Seljuk Sultan of Iconium, Kilij Arslan II (reigned 1156–1192). He was a member of the Byzantine Gabras family, very likely identical with, or possibly the son of, an unnamed member of the family who defected to the Sultan in the late reign of Emperor Manuel I Komnenos (r. 1143–1180), became a leading member of the Seljuk court, and served as the Seljuk ambassador to the Emperor during the Battle of Myriokephalon in 1175–1176.
- İshak Pasha (? – 1497, Thessaloniki) was a Greek (though some reports say he was Croatian) who became an Ottoman general, statesman and later Grand Vizier. His first term as a Grand Vizier was during the reign of Mehmet II ("The Conqueror"). During this term he transferred Turkmen people from their Anatolian city of Aksaray to newly conquered İstanbul to populate the city which had lost a portion of its former population prior to conquest. The quarter of the city is where the Aksaray migrants had settled is now called Aksaray. His second term was during the reign of Beyazıt II.
- Ismail Selim Pasha (Greek: Ισμαήλ Σελίμ Πασάς, ca. 1809–1867), also known as Ismail Ferik Pasha, was an Egyptian general of Greek origin. He was a grandson of Alexios Alexis (1692–1786) and a great-grandson of the nobleman Misser Alexis (1637 – ?). Ismail Selim was born Emmanouil (Greek: Εμμανουήλ Παπαδάκης) c. 1809 in a village near Psychro, located at the Lasithi Plateau on the island of Crete. He had been placed in the household of the priest Fragios Papadakis (Greek: Φραγκιός Παπαδάκης) when Fragios was slaughtered in 1823 by the Ottomans during the Greek War of Independence. Emmanouil's natural father was the Reverend Nicholas Alexios Alexis who died in the epidemic of plague in 1818. Emmanouil and his younger brothers Antonios Papadakis (Greek: Αντώνιος Παπαδάκης (1810–1878) and Andreas were captured by the Ottoman forces under Hassan Pasha who seized the plateau and were sold as slaves.
- Janus Bey, born in Modon at the end of the 15th century, was a Greek who became an interpreter (dragoman) and ambassador for the Ottoman Empire. In 1532, he visited Venice and had meetings with the Venetian government. He was considered as the ambassador for the Ottoman Empire, was well received and was the beneficiary of large presents from the Venetians. The same year, he apparently worked with French ambassador Antonio Rincon to obtain a safe-conduct for the Ottoman embassy to France. In 1537, he was co-author with Alvise Gritti of an Italian booklet, published in Venice, on the government of the Ottoman Empire. The title was Opera noua la quale dechiara tutto il gouerno del gran Turcho. He founded a mosque in Constantinople, called the "Dragoman's Mosque" (Durughman Mesjidi). He died in 1541 or 1542.
- Jamilah Kolocotronis, Greek-German ex. Lutheran scholar and writer.
- John Tzelepes Komnenos – (Greek: Ἰωάννης Κομνηνὸς Τζελέπης) son of Isaac Komnenos (d. 1154). Starting about 1130 John and his father, who was a brother of Emperor John II Komnenos ("John the Beautiful"), plotted to overthrow his uncle the emperor. They made various plans and alliances with the Danishmend leader and other Turks who held parts of Asia Minor. In 1138 John and his father had a reconciliation with the Emperor, and received a full pardon. In 1139 John accompanied the emperor on his campaign in Asia Minor. In 1140 at the siege of Neocaesarea he defected. As John Julius Norwich puts it, he did so by "embracing simultaneously the creed of Islam and the daughter of the Seljuk Sultan Mesud I." John Komnenos' by-name, Tzelepes, is believed to be a Greek rendering of the Turkish honorific Çelebi, a term indicating noble birth or "gentlemanly conduct". The Ottoman Sultans claimed descent from John Komnenos.
- Köse Mihal (Turkish for "Michael the Beardless"; 13th century – c. 1340) accompanied Osman I in his ascent to power as an Emir and founder of the Ottoman Empire. He is considered to be the first significant Byzantine renegade and convert to Islam to enter Ottoman service. He was also known as 'Gazi Mihal' and 'Abdullah Mihal Gazi'. Köse Mihal, was the Byzantine governor of Chirmenkia (Harmankaya, today Harmanköy) and was ethnically Greek. His original name was "Michael Cosses". The castle of Harmankaya (also known as Belekoma Castle) was in the foothills of the Uludağ Mountains in Bilecik Turkey. Mihal also eventually gained control of Lefke, Meceke and Akhisar.
- Kösem Sultan – (1589–1651), also known as Mehpeyker Sultan, was the most powerful woman in Ottoman history and the only woman to effectively rule the Empire. She was the wife of Ottoman Sultan Ahmed I (r. 1603–1617), and the Haseki Sultan of the Ottoman Empire from 1605 to 1617, and she became Valide Sultan from 1623 to 1651, when her sons Murad IV and Ibrahim I, and her grandson reigned as Ottoman sultans. She became the first ever female regent of the Ottoman Empire from 1623 to 1632, during the reign of her son, Murad IV, and again from 1648 to 1651, during the reign of her grandson Mehmed IV, effectively ruling the Ottoman Empire as a sultan for 13 years. She was the only woman to ever rule and control the Ottoman Empire like a sultan, and she played a significant role in the history of the Ottoman Empire, implementing various reforms during her reign as regent. She was the daughter of a priest from the island of Tinos; her maiden name was Anastasia.
- Leo of Tripoli (Greek: Λέων ὸ Τριπολίτης) was a Greek renegade and pirate serving Arab interests in the early tenth century.
- Mahfiruze Hatice Sultan – (d 1621), maiden name Maria, was the wife of the Ottoman Sultan Ahmed I and mother of Osman II.
- Mahmud Pasha Angelović – Mahmud Pasha or Mahmud-paša Anđelović (1420–1474), also known simply as Adni, was Serbian-born, of Byzantine noble descent (Angeloi) who became an Ottoman general and statesman, after being abducted as a child by the Sultan. As Veli Mahmud Paşa he was Grand Vizier in 1456–1468 and again in 1472–1474. A capable military commander, throughout his tenure he led armies or accompanied Mehmed II on his own campaigns.
- Mesih Pasha (1443–1501), was an Ottoman statesman of Byzantine Greek origin, being a nephew of the last Byzantine emperor, Constantine XI Palaiologos. He served as Kapudan Pasha of the Ottoman Navy and was grand vizier of the Ottoman Empire from 1499 to 1501. He was also commanded the Ottoman army in the Siege of Rhodes. Mesih and his elder brother, Khass Murad, were captured during the fall of Constantinople and raised as pages under the auspices of Mehmed II. Mesih was approximately ten years old at the time he was taken into palace service. He and two of his brothers, one of whom was Hass Murad Pasha, were captured, converted to Islam, and raised as pages under the auspices of Mehmed II as part of the devşirme system.
- Mimar Sinan (1489–1588) – Ottoman architect – his origins are possibly Greek. There is not a single document in Ottoman archives which state whether Sinan was Armenian, Albanian, Turk or Greek, only "Orthodox Christian". Those who suggest that he could be Armenian do this with the mere fact that the largest Christian community living at the vicinity of Kayseri were Armenians, but there was also a considerably large Greek population (e.g. the father of Greek-American film director Elia Kazan) in Kayseri.
- Mehmed Saqizli (Turkish: Sakızlı Mehmed Paşa, literally, Mehmed Pasha of Chios) (died 1649), (r.1631–49) was Dey and Pasha of Tripolis. He was born into a Christian family of Greek origin on the island of Chios and had converted to Islam after living in Algeria for years.
- Mohammed Khaznadar (محمد خزندار), born c. 1810 on the island of Kos (modern Greece) and died on 1889 at La Marsa was a Tunisian politician. A Mameluke of Greek origin, he was captured in a raid and bought as a slave by the Bey of Tunis: Hussein II Bey. Later on he became treasurer to Chakir Saheb Ettabaâ and was qaid of Sousse and Monastir from 1838. He remained for fifty years in one post or another in the service of five successive beys. In November 1861 he was named Minister of the Interior, then Minister of War in December 1862, Minister of the Navy in September 1865, Minister of the Interior again in October 1873 and finally Grand Vizier and President of the International Financial Commission from 22 July 1877 to 24 August 1878.
- Mustapha Khaznadar (1817–1887)(مصطفى خزندار), was Prime Minister of the Beylik of Tunis from 1837 to 1873. Of Greek origin, as Georgios Kalkias Stravelakis he was born on the island of Chios in 1817. Along with his brother Yannis, he was captured and sold into slavery by the Ottomans during the Massacre of Chios in 1822, while his father Stephanis Kalkias Stravelakis was killed. He was then taken to Smyrna and then Constantinople, where he was sold as a slave to an envoy of the Bey of Tunis.

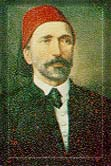
Raghib Pasha (ca. 1819–1884) was a Greek convert to Islam who served as Prime Minister of Egypt.

- Nafi ibn al-Azraq, ibn Qays al-Hanafi al-Bakri (Arabic: نافع بن الأزرق بن قيس الحنفي البكري, romanized: Nāfiʿ ibn al-Azraq ibn Qays al-Ḥanafī al-Bakrī; died 685) was the leader of the Kharijite faction of the Azariqa during the Second Fitna. His ethnic origin is not certain but his father was probably a freedman of Greek origin which, according to the historian Benjamin Jokisch, is further supported by his name, which was uncommon among the Arabs. He is said to have been a quietist before he was encouraged by the Kharijite poet Abu al-Wazi to become active. During the first Siege of Mecca in 683 he sided with Abd Allah ibn al-Zubayr to defend the city against the Umayyad besiegers, but after the siege was over, left him because of a difference of opinion on the murder of the third caliph Uthman (r. 644–656) and went to Basra where the city was already in civil war over tribal disputes. He took over the control of the city by murdering the deputy governor and broke open the prison to free his fellow Kharijites. He was later expelled by the new Zubayrid governor and fled to Ahwaz along with his followers. From there he undertook several raids against the southern Iraqi settlements before being killed by government forces in 685.
- Narjis, mother of Muhammad al-Mahdi the twelfth and last Imam of Shi'a Islam, Byzantine Princess, reportedly the descendant of the disciple Simon Peter, the vicegerent of Jesus.
- Nilüfer Hatun (Ottoman Turkish: نیلوفر خاتون, birth name Holifere (Holophira) / Olivera, other names Bayalun, Beylun, Beyalun, Bilun, Suyun, Suylun) was a Valide Hatun; the wife of Orhan, the second Ottoman Sultan. She was mother of the next sultan, Murad I. The traditional stories about her origin, traced back to the 15th century, are that she was daughter of the Byzantine ruler (Tekfur) of Bilecik, called Holofira. As some stories go, Orhan's father Osman raided Bilecik at the time of Holofira's wedding arriving there with rich presents and disguised and hidden soldiers. Holofira was among the loot and given to Orhan. However modern researchers doubt this story, admitting that it may have been based on real events. Doubts are based on various secondary evidence and lack of direct documentary evidence of the time. In particular, her Ottoman name Nilüfer meaning water lily in the Persian language. Other Historians make her a daughter of the Prince of Yarhisar or a Byzantine Princess Helen (Nilüfer), who was of ethnic Greek descent. Nilüfer Hatun Imareti (Turkish for "Nilüfer Hatun Soup Kitchen"), is a convent annex hospice for dervishes, now housing the Iznik Museum in İznik, Bursa Province. When Orhan Gazi was off on campaign Nilüfer acted as his regent, the only woman in Ottoman history who was ever given such power. During Murad's reign she was recognized as Valide Sultan, or Queen Mother, the first in Ottoman history to hold this title, and when she died she was buried beside Orhan Gazi and his father Osman Gazi in Bursa. The Muslim traveler Ibn Battuta, who visited Iznik in the 1330s, was a guest of Nilüfer Hatun, whom he described as 'a pious and excellent woman'.
- Nur Felek Kadinefendi (1863–1914), was the first consort of Isma'il Pasha of Egypt. She was born in Greece in 1837. Her maiden name was Tatiana. At a young age, she was captured during one the raids and sold into slavery. She was delivered as a concubine to the harem of Sa'id, the Wāli of Egypt in 1852. However, Isma'il Pasha, then not yet the Khedive of Egypt, took Tatiana as a concubine for him. She gave birth to Prince Hussein Kamel Pasha in 1853. She later converted to Islam and her name was changed to Nur Felek. When Isma'il Pasha ascended the throne in 1863, she was elevated to the rank of first Kadinefendi, literally meaning first consort, or wife.
- Osman Saqizli (Turkish: Sakızlı Osman Paşa, literally, Osman Pasha of Chios) (died 1672), (r.1649–72) was Dey and Pasha of Tripoli in Ottoman Libya. He was born into a Greek Christian family on the island of Chios (known in Ottoman Turkish as Sakız, hence his epithet "Sakızlı") and had converted to Islam.
- Pargalı İbrahim Pasha (d. 1536), the first Grand Vizier appointed by Suleiman the Magnificent of the Ottoman Empire (reigned 1520 to 1566).
- Photios (Emirate of Crete) – Photios (Greek: Φώτιος, fl. ca. 872/3) was a Byzantine renegade and convert to Islam who served the Emirate of Crete as a naval commander in the 870s.
- Qaratis, also known as Umm Harun (Arabic: أم هارون) or Umm al-Wathiq (أم الواثق), was the umm walad of the eighth Abbasid caliph al-Mu'tasim, and mother of his successor, al-Wathiq. Qaratis was a Byzantine Greek woman. She entered the caliphal harem probably in 811. She was raised in the Abbasid household before being given as a concubine to the young Abbasid prince Abu Ishaq Muhammad ibn Harun. It is unknown if she was converted to Islam before or after entering the harem. Qaratis was slightly younger than Abu Ishaq Muhammad. She gave birth to two sons, Abu Ja'far Harun (the future al-Wathiq) and Muhammad. Abu Ja'far Harun was born on 17 April 812 (various sources give slightly earlier or later dates in 811–813), on the road to Mecca. The elder son of Qaratis was nominated heir by al-Mu'tasim. After the death of al-Mu'tasim on 5 January 842, her son ascended smoothly to the throne without any opposition by his brothers. Qaratis also became the head of the Abbasid household. Shortly after al-Wathiq's succession, Qaratis decided to go to Hajj. She accompanied al-Wathiq's half-brother Ja'far (the future caliph al-Mutawakkil) on the Hajj in 842, but she died on the way at al-Hirah, on 16 August 842 (A.H. 227). She was buried in Kufa.
- Raghib Pasha (1819–1884), was Prime Minister of Egypt. He was of Greek ancestry and was born in Greece on 18 August 1819 on either the island of Chios following the great Massacre or Candia Crete. After being kidnapped to Anatolia he was brought to Egypt as a slave by Ibrahim Pasha in 1830 and converted to Islam. Raghib Pasha ultimately rose to levels of importance serving as Minister of Finance (1858–1860), then Minister of War (1860–1861). He became Inspector for the Maritime Provinces in 1862, and later Assistant (Arabic: باشمعاون) to viceroy Isma'il Pasha (1863–1865). He was granted the title of beylerbey and then appointed President of the Privy council in 1868. He was appointed President of the Chamber of Deputies (1866–1867), then Minister of Interior in 1867, then Minister of Agriculture and Trade in 1875. Isma'il Ragheb became Prime Minister of Egypt in 1882.\
- Reşid Mehmed Pasha, also known as Kütahı (Greek: Μεχμέτ Ρεσίτ πασάς Κιουταχής, 1780–1836), was a prominent Ottoman statesman and general who reached the post of Grand Vizier in the first half of the 19th century, playing an important role in the Greek War of Independence. Reşid Mehmed was born in Georgia, the son of a Greek Orthodox priest. As a child, he was captured as a slave by the Turks, and brought to the service of the then Kapudan Husrev Pasha. His intelligence and ability impressed his master, and secured his rapid rise.
- Rum Mehmed Pasha was an Ottoman statesman. He was Grand Vizier of the Ottoman Empire from 1466 to 1469.
- Saliha Sultan (Ottoman Turkish: صالحه سلطان; c. 1680 – 21 September 1739) was the consort of Sultan Mustafa II of the Ottoman Empire, and Valide sultan to their son, Sultan Mahmud I. Saliha Sultan was allegedly born in 1680 in a Greek family in Azapkapı, Istanbul.
- Turgut Reis – (1485–1565) was a notorious Barbary pirate of the Ottoman Empire. He was born of Greek descent in a village near Bodrum, on the Aegean coast of Asia Minor. After converting to Islam in his youth he served as Admiral and privateer who also served as Bey of Algiers; Beylerbey of the Mediterranean; and first Bey, later Pasha, of Tripoli. Under his naval command the Ottoman Empire was extended across North Africa. When Tugut was serving as pasha of Tripoli, he adorned and built up the city, making it one of the most impressive cities along the North African Coast. He was killed in action in the Great Siege of Malta.
- Yaqut al-Hamawi (Yaqut ibn-'Abdullah al-Rumi al-Hamawi) (1179–1229) (Arabic: ياقوت الحموي الرومي) was an Islamic biographer and geographer renowned for his encyclopaedic writings on the Muslim world. He was born in Constantinople, and as his nisba "al-Rumi" ("from Rūm") indicates he had Byzantine Greek ancestry.
- Yaqut al-Musta'simi (also Yakut-i Musta'simi) (died 1298) was a well-known calligrapher and secretary of the last Abbasid caliph. He was born of Greek origin in Amaseia and carried off when he was very young. He codified six basic calligraphic styles of the Arabic script. Naskh script was said to have been revealed and taught to the scribe in a vision. He developed Yakuti, a handwriting named after him, described as a thuluth of "a particularly elegant and beautiful type." Supposedly he had copied the Qur'an more than a thousand times.
- Yusuf Islam (born Steven Demetre Georgiou; 21 July 1948, aka Cat Stevens) the famous singer of Cypriot Greek origin, converted to Islam at the height of his fame in December 1977 and adopted his Muslim name, Yusuf Islam, the following year.

== See also ==
- List of former mosques in Greece
- Islam in Greece
