= Çakıroğlu =

Çakıroğlu can refer to:

- Çakıroğlu, Azdavay
- Çakıroğlu, Maden
- Çakıroğlu (surname)

== See also ==
- Çakıroğlu İsmail Ağa Konağı
