= Çaykara =

- District and municipality
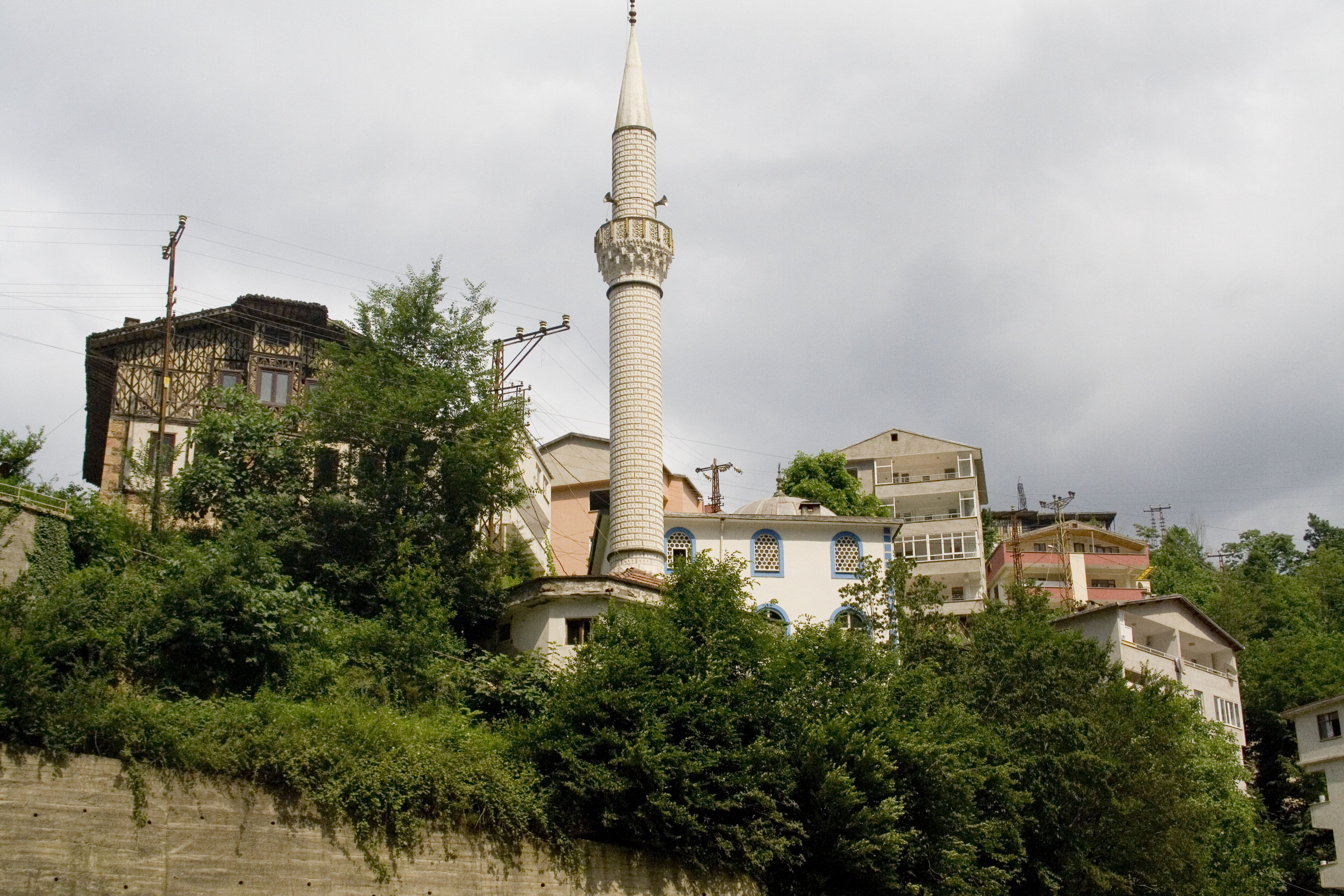
- Houses and a mosque in Çaykara

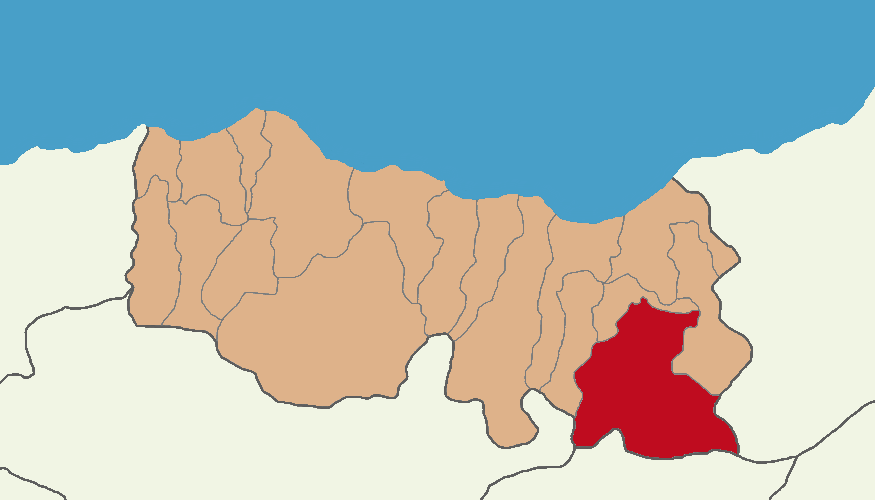
- Map showing Çaykara District in Trabzon Province

- Location within Turkey
- Coordinates: 40°44′51″N 40°14′31″E
- Country: Turkey
- Province: Trabzon

Government
  - Mayor: Hanefi Tok (AKP)
- Area: 574 km^{2} (222 sq mi)
- Population (2022): 13,070
  - Density: 22.8/km^{2} (59.0/sq mi)
- Time zone: UTC+3 (TRT)
- Postal code: 61940
- Area code: 0462
- Climate: Cfa
- Website: www.caykara.bel.tr

Çaykara (Romeika: Κατωχώρι, Kadahor) is a municipality and district of Trabzon Province, Turkey. Its area is 574 km^{2}, and its population is 13,070 (2022). As of 2023, the Mayor of Çaykara is Hanefi Tok (AKP). Çaykara village lies in a V-shaped valley along the Solaklı River in the Pontic Mountains, at an elevation of around 300 metres. Çaykara district lies to the south of Dernekpazarı (Kondu) and forms the upper part of the Of-valley system ('Solaklı Vadisi' in Turkish), with peaks reaching to over 3300 meters. The western half of İkizdere district - which lies just east of Çaykara and is now part of Rize province - was historically also part of the same administrative and cultural region. Large swathes of the district are made up of old-growth temperate broadleaf and mixed forest, gradually making way for alpine tundra at higher altitudes.

== Etymology ==
The district takes its name from the Çaykara stream, which forms through the conjunction of the Solaklı and Yeşilalan brooks. The historic name of Çaykara is Kadahor or Katokhôr (from Kato Choriou "lower village" in Pontic Greek). As is typical in transhumance communities in the Pontic Mountains and the Caucasus, Kadahor was settled with a number of subordinate upland villages for different seasons, which explains its name. However, in current times the name 'Tsaikara' (Τσαϊκάρα) is also used in Pontic Greek.

== History ==
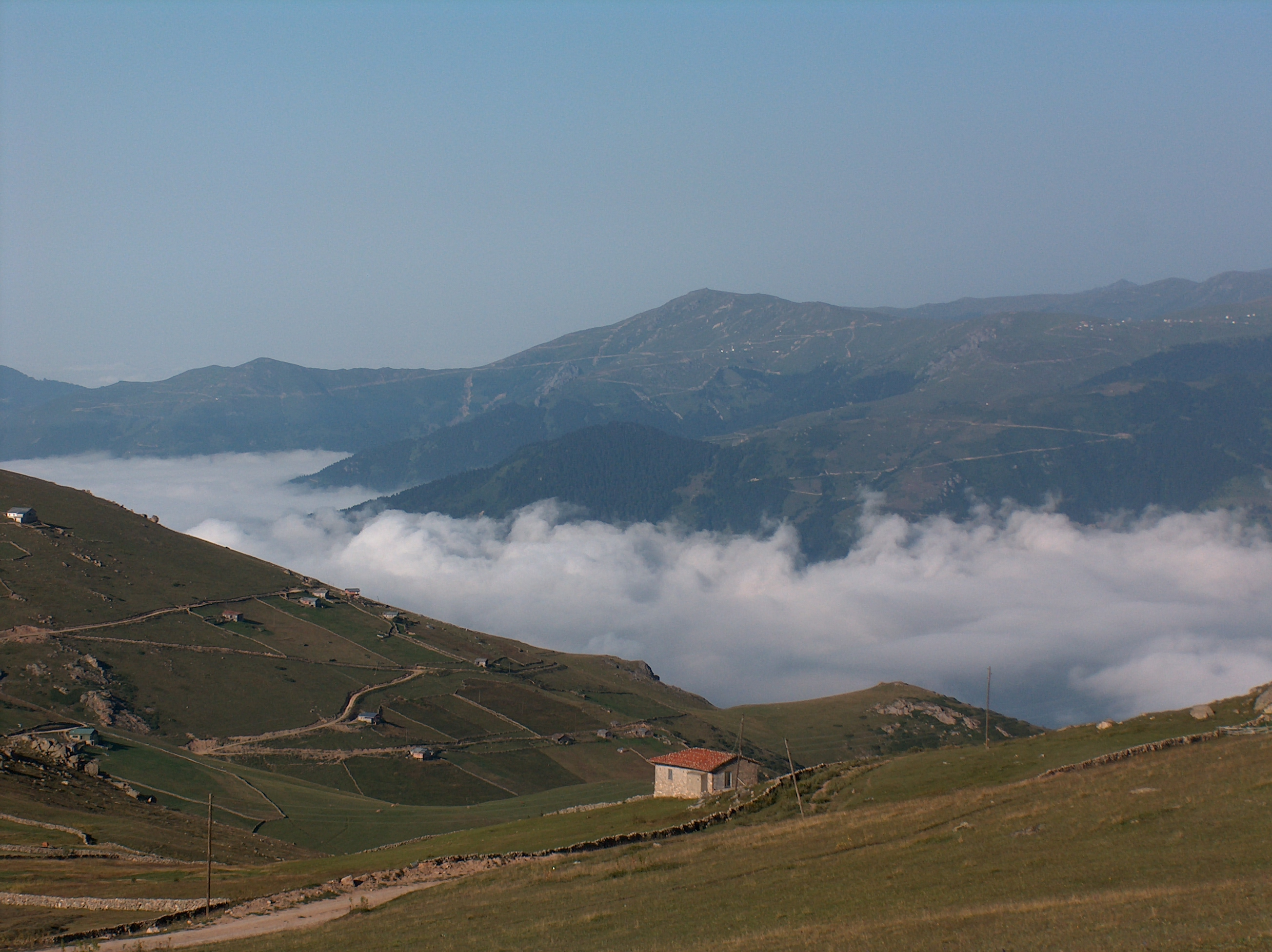
Sea of clouds in Çaykara district

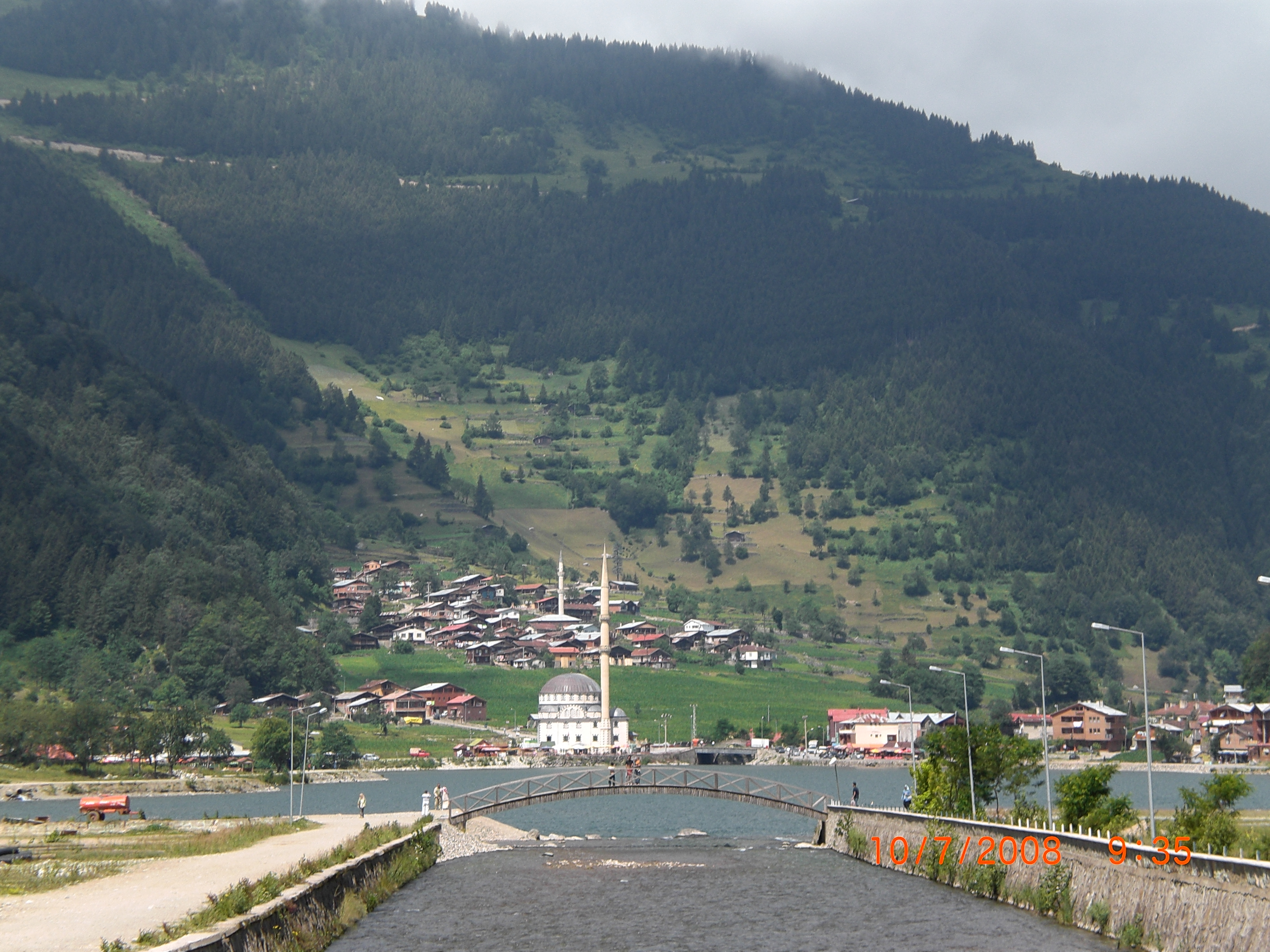
Uzungöl village and lake in Çaykara

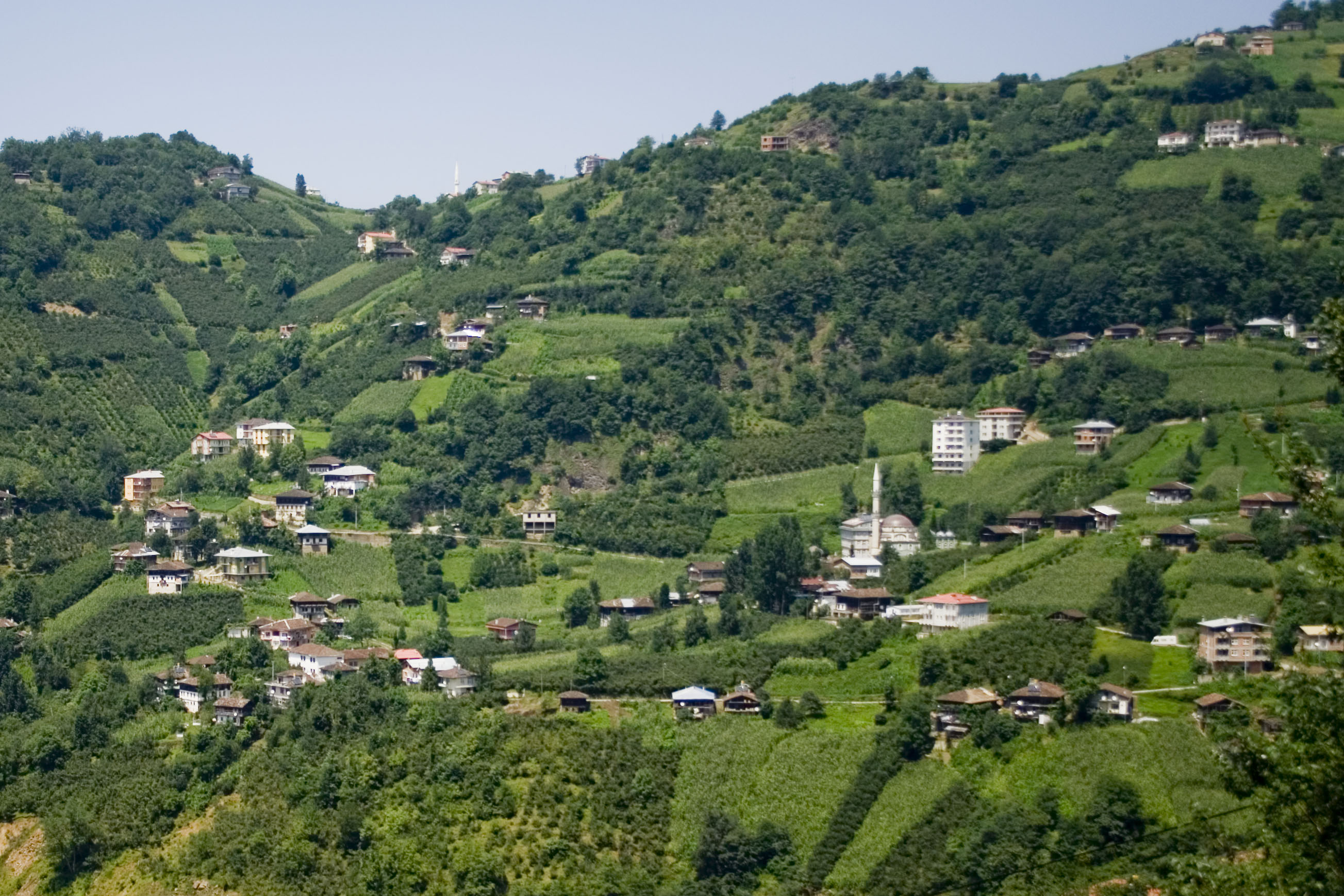
Another village in Çaykara

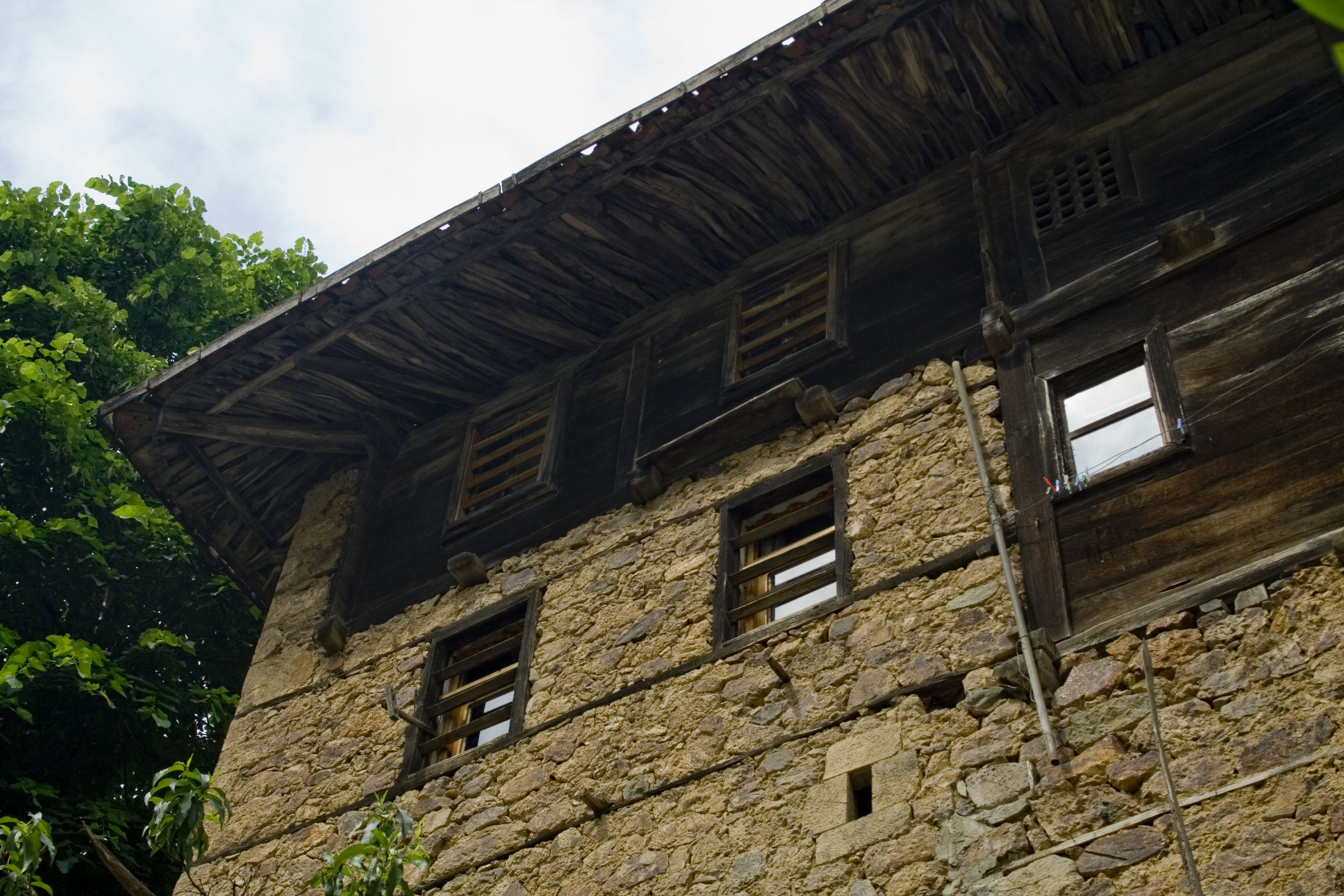
A traditional house in Çaykara

Current Çaykara district covers the upper parts of the 'Ophis' ('Solaklı' in modern Turkish) river valley, and its tributaries. The river Ophis and a homonymous Greek settlement at its mouth were first mentioned in antiquity by Arrian. A path besides the river functioned as a trade route connecting the coast with eastern Anatolia, through 'Paipert' (current Bayburt). In the Middle Ages, the administrative region (or Bandon) to which the area of Çaykara belonged was known as Stylos. It lay between the bandon of Sourmena and Rhizaion. Settlement of the higher parts of the valley is first attested in the middle-ages, when it was part of the Byzantine Empire. The history of individual villages and towns in the district going back to antiquity is unknown. This may be due to the frequent landslides that occur there, and the limited archeological research which has been conducted. A few place names hint at a possible Chaldian presence in the valley before it was Hellenized, such as the Haldizen (Χάλντιζεν) stream in the southeast of the district and the village 'Halt' (Χάλτ, or Söğütlü in Turkish), downstream in Of-district. It is assumed that Kadahor was one of the original settlements in the area, which may explain its name and function as the central market-town of the upper valley.

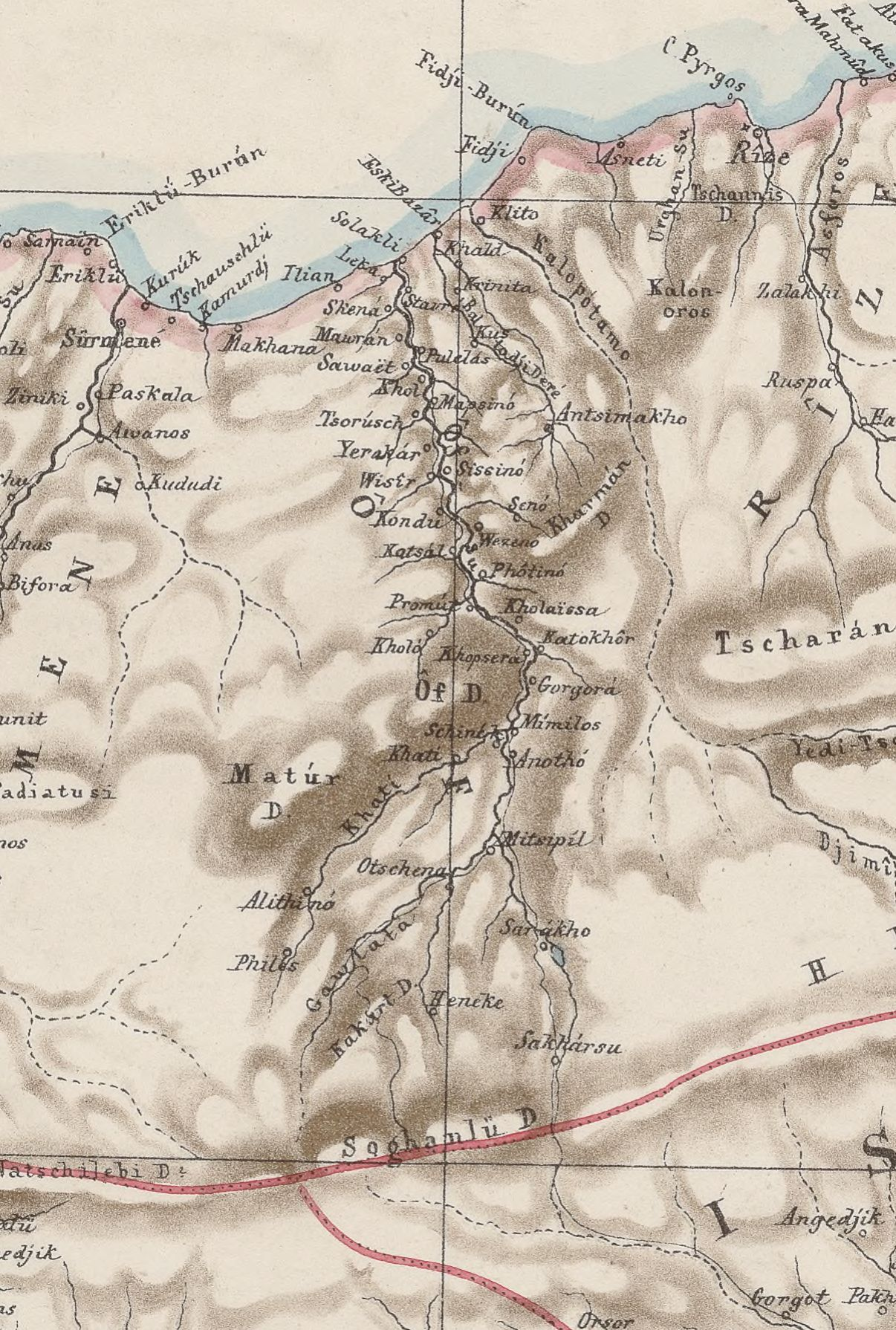
Section of an 1877 map showing the original names of towns and villages in Of and Çaykara (Katokhôr)

According to local oral histories, the valley functioned as an alternative trading route during the late medieval period connecting Trabzon - through the coastal town of Of - to Persia and beyond. At that time the valley was part of the Empire of Trebizond. On a hill overlooking Çaykara town, just west of the village Taşören, Çaykara (Zeleka), lies a ruined fortress which according to locals was constructed by Genoese traders. The Genoese also held the fortress town of Bayburt - south of Çaykara - which could be reached by the mountain pass near Sakarsu (modern Şekersu). Çaykara entered Ottoman rule in 1461, following the Ottoman conquest of the Empire of Trebizond by Sultan Mehmed II. According to Greek historiographers the valleys attracted residents of coastal cities who sought refuge from Ottoman taxation. While the population of the valley at that time was mostly made up of Greek-speaking Christians, the locals did have interactions with nomadic Turkish tribes on the summer pastures.

According to the Ottoman tax books (tahrir defterleri) of 1486, there were 1277 people living in the historic villages that were located within the present-day Çaykara district (namely the villages of Ğorğoras (in Greek: Γοργορά), Holayisa, Paçan and Zeno (in Greek: Ξένος), where there were 235 houses (1 of them inhabited by Muslims, 234 of them by Christians.) During the Ottoman period the valley also housed a small number of Armenians, who had settled there in the villages Fotinos and Harhes after they had been attacked and chased-off from neighboring valleys by a clan leader called İslamoğlu Bey.

According to the Ottoman tax books (tahrir defterleri) of 1681, the inhabitants of the villages of Ğorğoras, Holayisa, Paçan, Zeno, Yente, Haldizen, İpsil (in Greek: Υψηλή), Okene, Sero (Siros), Kadahor, Hopşera, Sarahos (in Greek: Σαχάρω), Fotinos (in Greek: Φωτεινός) and Zeleka had been fully converted to Islam. In 1681, there were 2100 people living in 380 houses, all of them Muslims. The villages in the valley had a well developed educational system; In the late Ottoman period the uplands of Çaykara housed dozens of seminaries, attracting students from across Anatolia. As a result, the region had one of the highest literacy rates in the empire, and many of the inhabitants of the valley registered surnames in the 19th century - well before other Muslim groups in Anatolia. This history of literacy is reflected in the many scientists, politicians, musicians, directors, etc. that came from the sparsely populated villages in the district. At times the valley also attracted small groups of settlers or refugees from other parts of the empire, such as Arabs from Maraş and Circassians from the Caucasus.

In 1915, during the Caucasus Campaign of World War I, Ottoman forces and local guerrillas fought the invading Russian army at the Sultan Murat Plateau (Turkish: Sultan Murat Yaylası 40°40′12″N 40°10′13″E), a high plateau 25 km (16 mi) southwest of Çaykara's town center. A monumental cemetery for the fallen Ottoman soldiers, named Şehitler Tepesi (Hill of Martyrs) is located there. The Russian army constructed a new road through the valley, connecting it to the Anatolian plateau south of the Pontic Mountains. The road was meant to function as an alternative supply route for the Russian forces in eastern Anatolia, as they were unable to hold the Zigana Pass south of Trabzon. Part of the road is still in use as the D915, which is recognized as one of the most dangerous roads in the world due to its many hairpins without guard rails.

Because of their Islamic identity, the inhabitants of Kadahor/Çaykara were not deported during the population exchange between Greece and Turkey in 1923. A few dozen families from the valley that had retained their Christian beliefs chose to resettle in Macedonia, Greece, in the village of Nea Trapezounta (New Trabzon). Many families across the valley retain some contact with relatives in Greece.

Until 1925, Çaykara was a village bound to the Of district within Trabzon Province. In 1925, it became a bucak (subdistrict), and on 1 June 1947 it became an ilçe (district) of Trabzon Province. During the first half of the 20th century the mother tongue of the residents of the district remained the local Of-dialect of Pontic Greek (colloquially called 'Romeyka', or 'Rumca' in Turkish). Up until the first decade of the 21st century there were many elderly women who were monolingual in Romeyka. All of the permanently settled villages in the district were officially renamed in the 1960s. However, except for Çaykara and Uzungöl - which are the places where the community interacts with the state - these new Turkish names have not caught on. Local toponyms of Greek, Chaldian and Armenian origin such as the names of seasonal settlements, streams, hills and mountains remain in use. Only in the second half of the 20th century did the prevalence of 'Romeyka' start to dwindle among the younger generations.

Through a series of state-sponsored programs from the 1940s to the 1970s thousands of residents of Çaykara villages were offered resettlement in other parts of the Turkish Republic and Cyprus. Çaykarali's were settled in Van's Özalp district on the Iranian border (in the village of 'Emek'), in the city Kırıkhan on the Syrian border, in the villages Davlos, Flamoudi and Trikomo in Northern Cyprus, and in Muş province. There is also a settlement of people from Çaykara on the island Imbros, adjacent the Greek village Dereköy. These resettlements and subsequent migrations within and outside Turkey resulted in a stark decline of the population of the district - from around 40.000 people to just above 12.000. While some migrants were able to retain the use of Romeyka due to geographic isolation (those in Van) or contact with local Greek populations (those on Imbros and Cyprus), the use of the language in Çaykara district itself declined. It remains unclear if the linguistic background of the villages was a reason for the government-initiated programmes.

== Composition ==
There are 32 neighbourhoods in Çaykara District:

- Akdoğan
- Arpaözü
- Aşağıkumlu
- Ataköy
- Baltacılı
- Çambaşı
- Çamlıbel
- Çayıroba
- Demirkapı
- Demirli
- Derindere
- Eğridere
- Işıklı
- Kabataş
- Karaçam
- Kayran
- Köknar
- Koldere
- Köseli
- Maraşlı
- Şahinkaya
- Şekersu
- Soğanlı
- Taşkıran
- Taşlıgedik
- Taşören
- Ulucami
- Uzungöl
- Uzuntarla
- Yaylaönü
- Yeşilalan
- Yukarıkumlu

== Culture ==
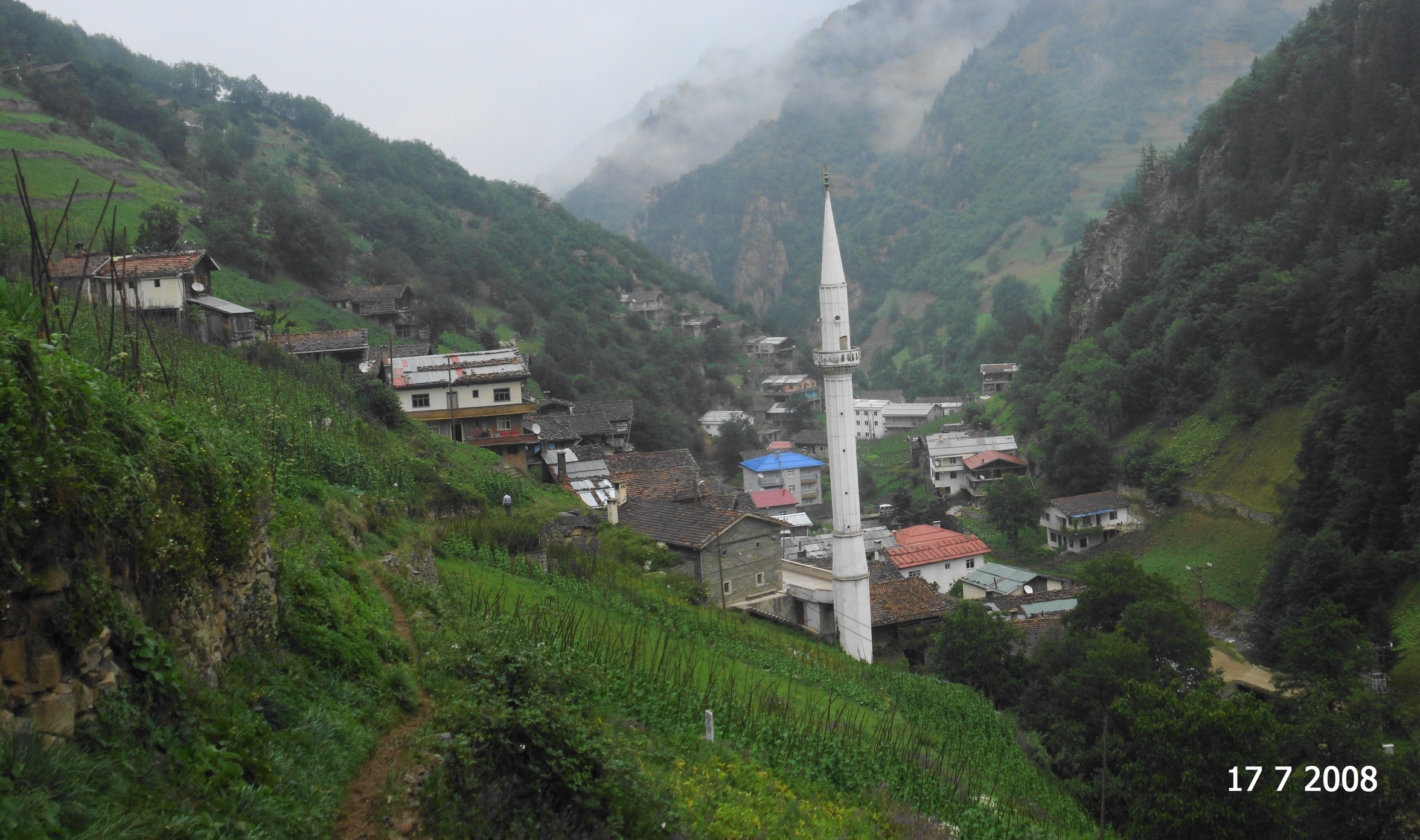
Alithinos (Uzuntarla) village, with steep crop fields in front.

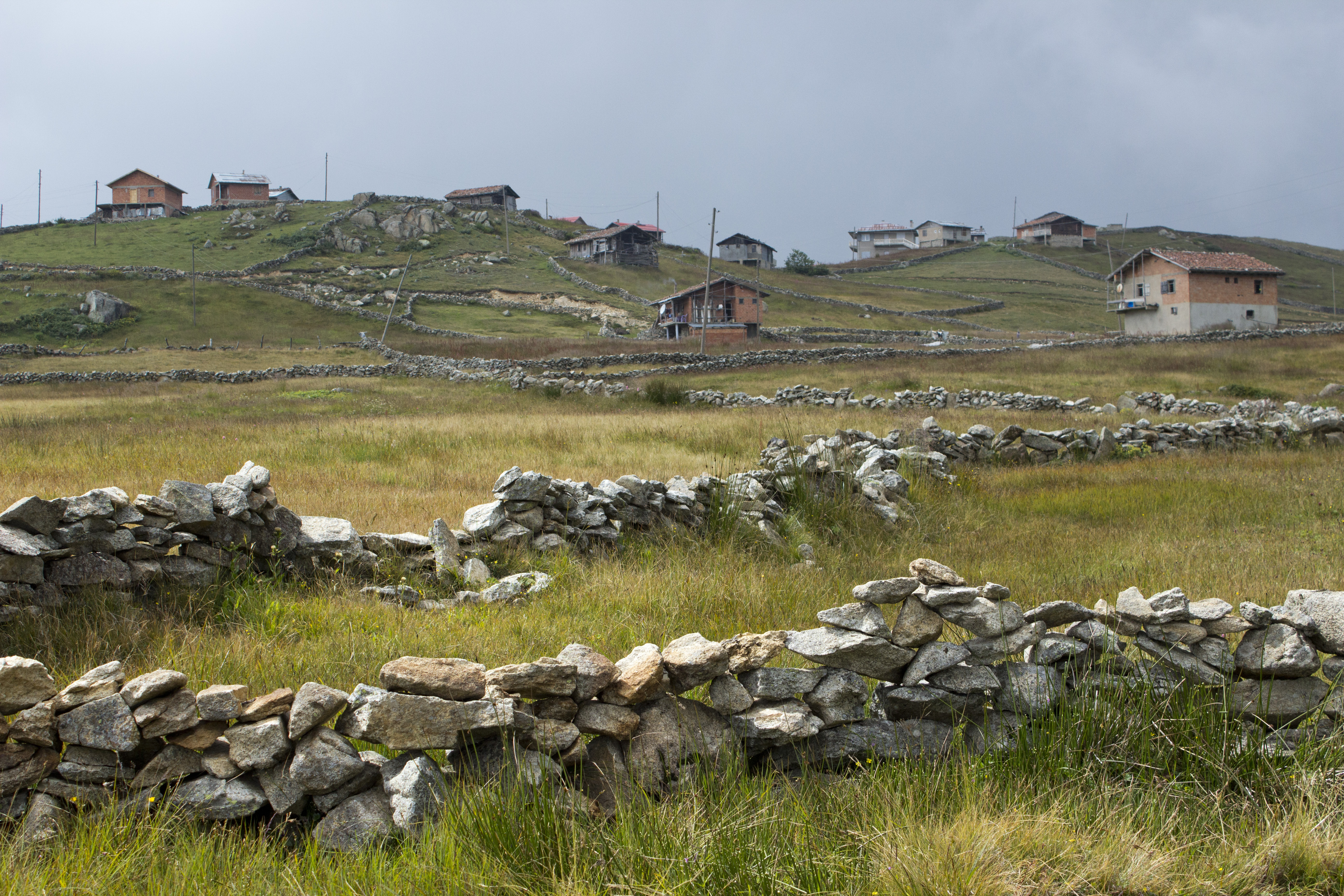
'Dry stone' walls to keep cattle out at Tsaxmut plateau (Cahmud yaylası).

=== Language ===
The mother tongue of most inhabitants of the district above the age of 50 is the Of-dialect of Pontic Greek, Romeyka (i.e. 'language of the Romans'), which has been described as the living language closest to Ancient Greek. Due to the community's isolation the dialect retained many archaisms. The language is not taught outside the home, and for a long time it was discouraged to speak it at school. Still, some of the younger generation continue to speak the language, and many have at least a basic understanding of it. The Turkish Latin alphabet is used for communication on online platforms. There are about two dozen Grecophone villages in the district, making it the largest concentration of Greek speakers in the Turkish Republic. While locals generally don't like being addressed as Greek, they are proud of their linguistic heritage, which they use to communicate with Greek-speaking tourists. Inhabitants from Of and Çaykara also settled villages in neighboring Sürmene and Köprübaşı districts, a little further to the west. Thus there are also some pockets of Çaykara/Of-dialect Greek speaking villages in these other parts of Trabzon province. That the Of-dialect of Pontic Greek remained so virulent in this area is partly due to the fact that local imams educated and preached in this language until the second part of the 20th century. Many folk singers from the district have recorded songs in Romeyka. Native of Çaykara Vahit Tursun published a Turkish-Romeyka dictionary in 2019. Most residents of the district are also fluent in Turkish. The most popular musical instruments in the district are the kaval flute, and the kemençe violin.

=== Transhumance ===
Many of the permanent residents of the district still live a life of transhumance, migrating with their cattle between two or three different settlements belonging to the same village; An agricultural settlement near the bottom of the valley, a logging village halfway up the mountain, and a hamlet on the summer grazing land above the tree line ('parharia' or 'yayla'). Most chalets on the yayla have their own dry stone-enclosed private field, but also share a larger enclosed meadow. In good years, the fields above the tree line produce some additional barley for the cattle. The spatial structure and the ratio of public to private space differs widely between the yayla's, while there are some recurring patterns. Some of the hamlets have a strong egalitarian and communal structure, with all houses having just a small private garden of approximately the same size. In a few cases there are no private gardens at all. Other hamlets are made up of multiple generational kinship clusters, with each generation adding increasingly larger fields to their cluster. There are, however, also yayla's with a more individualistic spatial organisation. Cows roam freely on the yayla, seeking out the best alpine flowers. During the summer months herders guide their sheep through the mountains. On Tuesdays villagers head down to the local market at Çaykara town. In some villages the 'old new year' of the Julian calendar is celebrated on 14 January (called 'Kalandar'). Villagers dressed as folk characters go door to door making jokes and collecting food or supplies for a shared meal or other communal activity.

=== Tourism ===
In recent years the valley has become a major tourist attraction. During the summer months Lake Uzungöl attracts thousands of tourists on a daily basis. Especially in the vicinity of the lake dozens of small and medium-sized hotels have been built - often without a permit - leading to conflict with authorities. In 2019 the eclectic Uzungöl Dursun Ali İnan Museum was opened just east of the lake, showcasing objects relating to the history, culture, nature and geography of the district, as well as a large collection of tree root and trunk art. According to some researchers the state has used tourism as an instrument to subvert local culture through the 'festivalisation' of the celebrations related to the agricultural calendar and the transhumance landscapes.

== Villages ==
Within Çaykara district there are about 30 villages which are more or less permanently settled. These villages are listed north to south, with their Turkish and Greek names. In most cases these villages also have or share a distinct logging settlement, a lower communal pasture (called a 'kom' in Romeyka, 'mezire' in Turkish), and a hamlet on the high summer pasture ('parharia' or 'megalo kampos' in Romeyka, 'yayla' in Turkish). These smaller seasonally occupied places are not listed here.

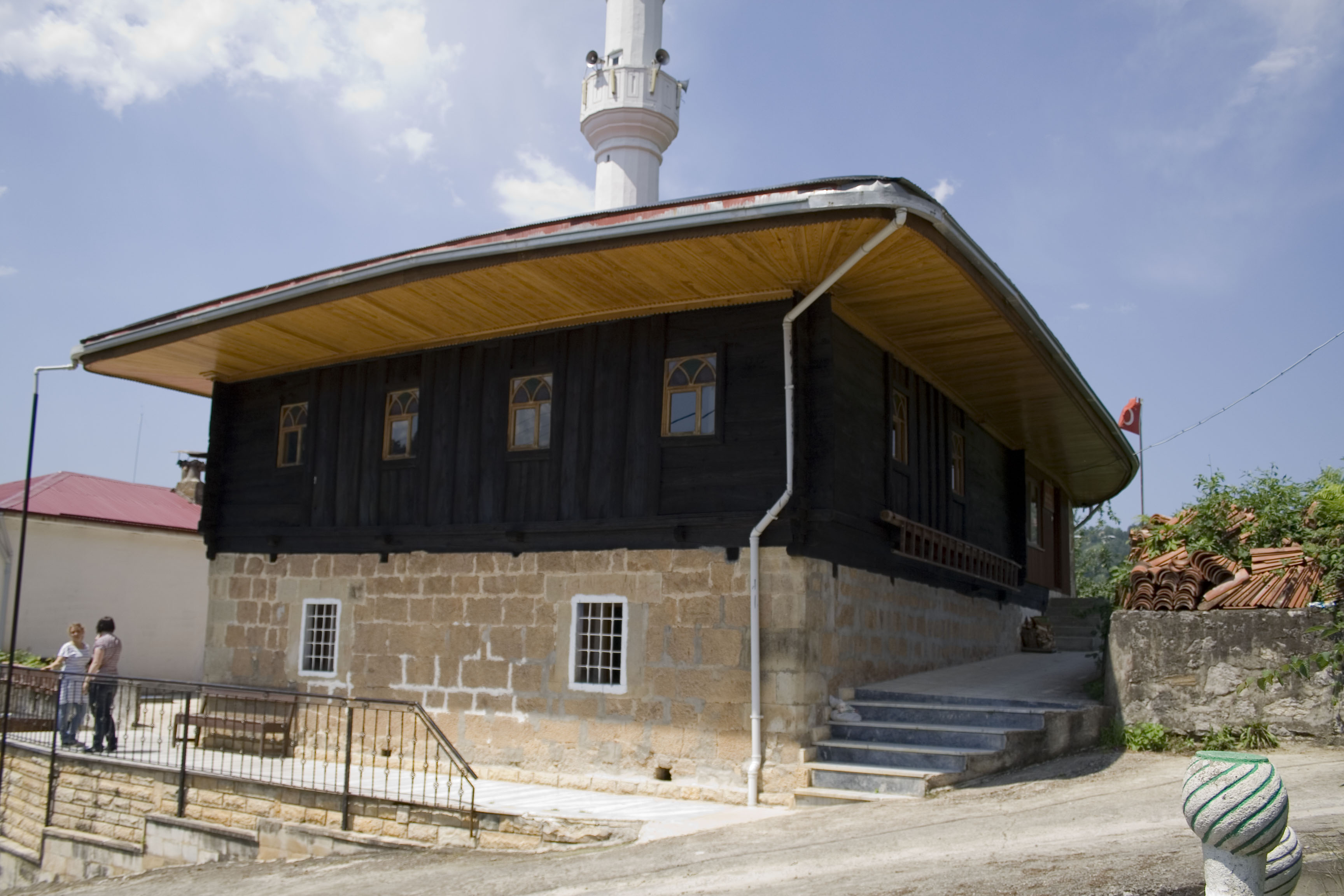
The mosque of Zeleka (Taşören) in 2010, just after it had been restored, and just before it burned down. Currently (2018), the mosque has been restored again.

| Name of village | Greek name of village |
|---|---|
| Akdoğan | Χοψερά |
| Soğanlı | Κάτω Χοψερά |
| Kabataş | Φωτεινός |
| Baltacılı/Yeşilalan | Χολάισσα |
| Çaykara | Κατωχωρίου |
| Taşören | Ζέλεκα |
| Kayran | Λιμνή |
| Eğridere | Γοργοράς |
| Sur | Σύρος, Σούρ' |
| Koldere | Βαχτάνος |
| Ataköy | Σινέκ |
| Yukarıkumlu | Άνω Μίμιλος |
| Aşağıkumlu | Κάτω Μίμιλος |
| Çambaşı | Άνωθο |
| Taşlıgedik | Μεζιρέ Πατσάν |
| Çamlıbel | Άνω Σινέκ |
| Taşkıran | Τσορόσ' |
| Köşeli | Κλεισουρα |
| Demirli | Κοτλού |
| Derindere | Ασσό Φώλιζα |
| Çayıroba | Γέντη |
| Uzungöl | Σαράχο |
| Köknar | Όκενα |
| Uzuntarla | Αληθινός |
| Yaylaönü | Χάρος |
| Karaçam | Άνω Όκενα |
| Arpaözü | Υψήλ |
| Ulucami | Ζήνων |

== Geography ==
Uzungöl and Lake Aygır are some of the lakes in Çaykara district.

=== Yaylas ===
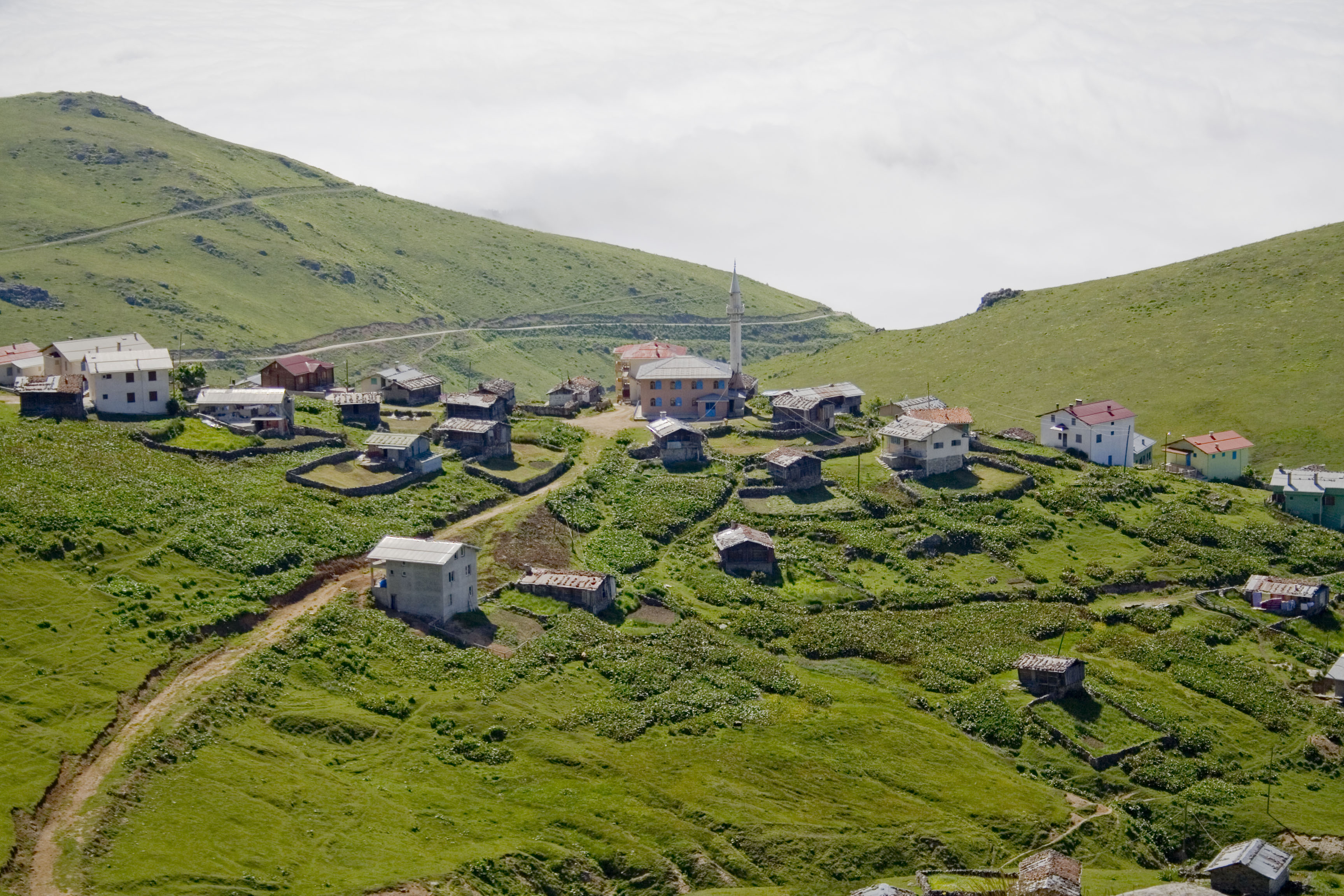
The summer settlement of Ğorğoras (Eğridere) at Ligoras ('Wolf-mountain'), or in Turkish: Kurt Daği.

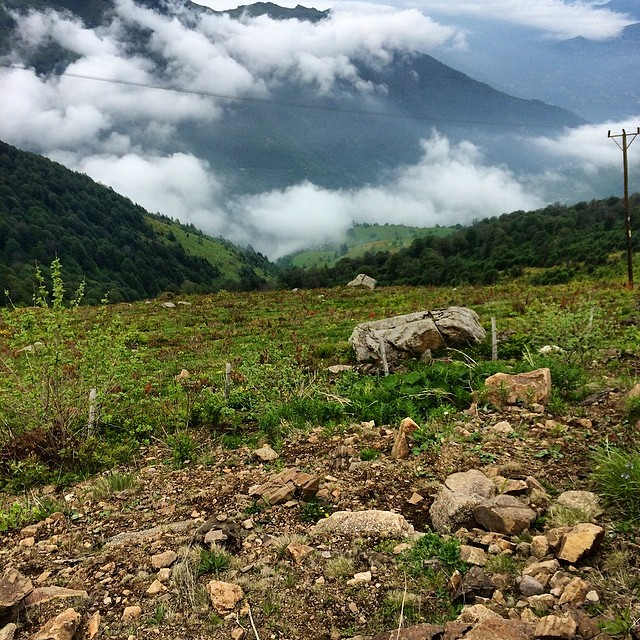
A view at Sultan Murat Yayla

In the upper parts of Çaykara district there are six distinct yaylas (summer pastures), each with multiple hamlets. The most famous one of these is Sultan Murat Yaylası, which is shared by the hamlets Sıcakoba, Hanırmak, Şahinkaya, Eğrisu, Vartan and Cerah.

== Notable residents ==
- Cevdet Sunay (1899), Fifth president of Turkey
- Behram Kurşunoğlu (1922), physicist
- Yeşim Ustaoğlu (1960), architect and film director
- Sebahattin Öztürk (1962) Bureaucrat, governor
- Eyüp Aşık (1953) politician, ex-parliamenter
- Mehmet Kara (1939) politician, ex-soldier

== See also ==
- Trabzon
- Uzungöl
