= School of Zurel =

Pontic Greek language school in the Ottoman Empire

- Σχολείο του Ζουρέλ (Greek); Zurel köyü okulu (Turkish)
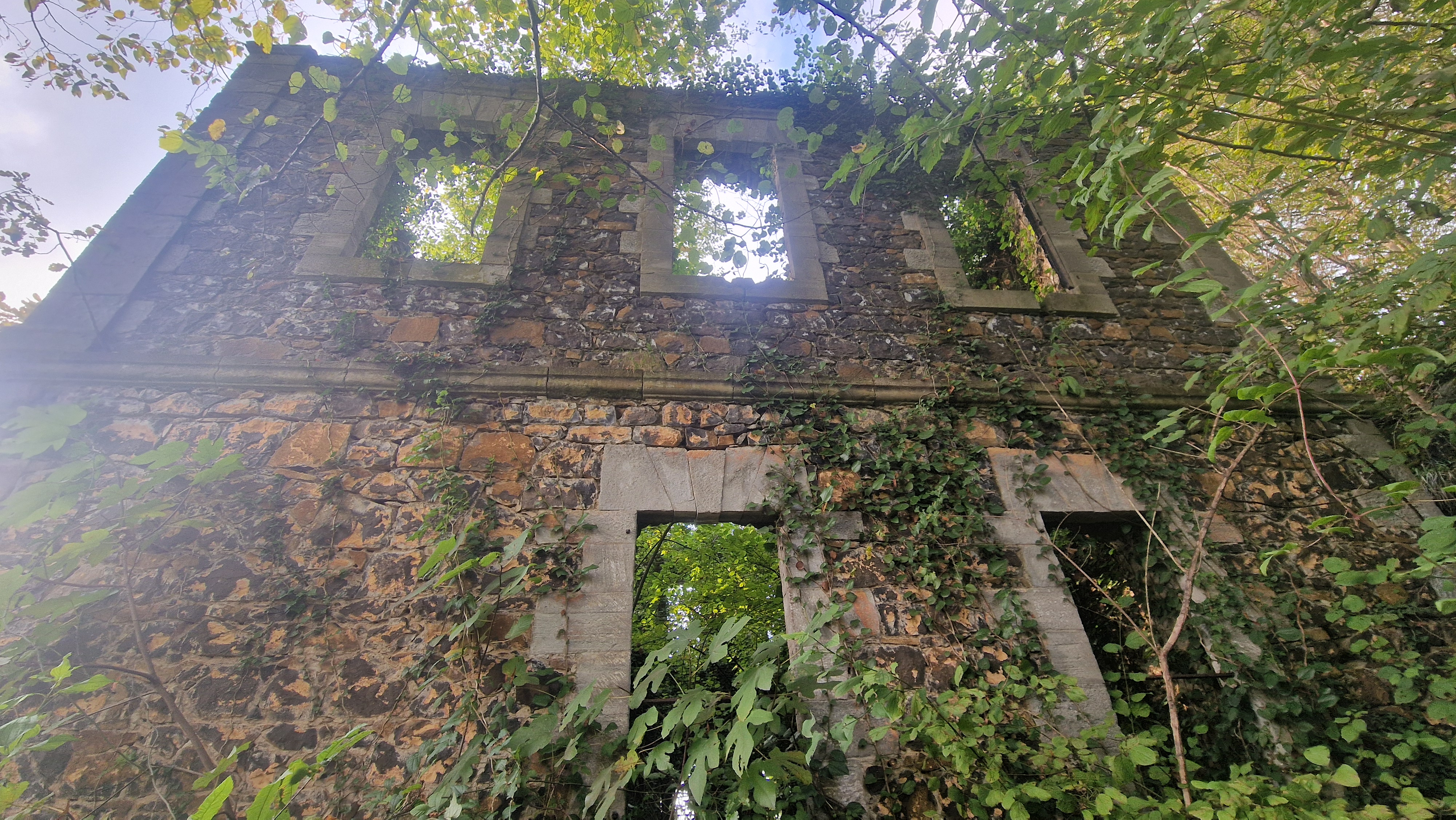
- Overgrown east facade of the roofless village school ruin in Zurel (Sarayköy), Of District.
- Zurel (Of District, Trabzon); Ottoman Empire

Information
- Type: Village school (Pontic language)

The School of Zurel (Greek: Σχολείο του Ζουρέλ; Turkish: Zurel Köyü Okulu) was a Pontic language village school of the local Eastern Orthodox Christian community in the village of Zurel (now Sarayköy) in the Of district of Trabzon Province, which was later used in the Republic era as a Turkish middle school.

== Description ==
The school building was a three-storey stone structure. It was financed by contributions from the villagers and was regarded within the Of region as the largest and most modern school building of its time.

== History ==
At the turn of the 19th to the 20th century, a school of the local Pontic-speaking community is recorded for Zurel. Between about 1900 and 1914, the school underwent a phase of modernization, with new curricula and teaching methods being introduced. Later, in the Republican period, the building was used as a Turkish middle school.
