= Akköse =

Village in the Dernekpazarı district of Trabzon Province, Turkey

- Neighbourhood
- Location in Turkey
- Coordinates: 40°47′28″N 40°16′34″E
- Country: Turkey
- Province: Trabzon
- District: Dernekpazarı
- Population (2022): 444
- Time zone: UTC+3 (TRT)

Akköse (Pontic: Ζένο) is a neighbourhood of the municipality and district of Dernekpazarı, Trabzon Province, Turkey. Its population is 444 (2022). It is situated in between high mountains, in a lush and largely untouched environment. Districts of the village: Liso, Lisako, Aksilisa, Agorgor, Gaylorashi, Siseno.
