= Tüfekçi =

Tüfekçi (literally 'riflemen' or 'gunsmith' in Turkish language) may refer to:

== Places ==
- Tüfekçi, Dernekpazarı, a village in Trabzon Province, Turkey
- Tüfekçi, Daday, a village in Kastamonu Province, Turkey

== People ==
- Bülent Tüfenkci (born 1966), Turkish politician
- Elias Toufexis (born 1975), Canadian actor
- İlyas Tüfekçi (born 1960), Turkish retired footballer
- Nida Tüfekçi (1929–1993), Turkish folk singer
- Zeynep Tufekci, Turkish academic

== Other uses ==
- Tüfekçi (Ottoman soldier), Ottoman army riflemen (like the Spanish tercios)
