= Dernekpazarı =

- District and municipality
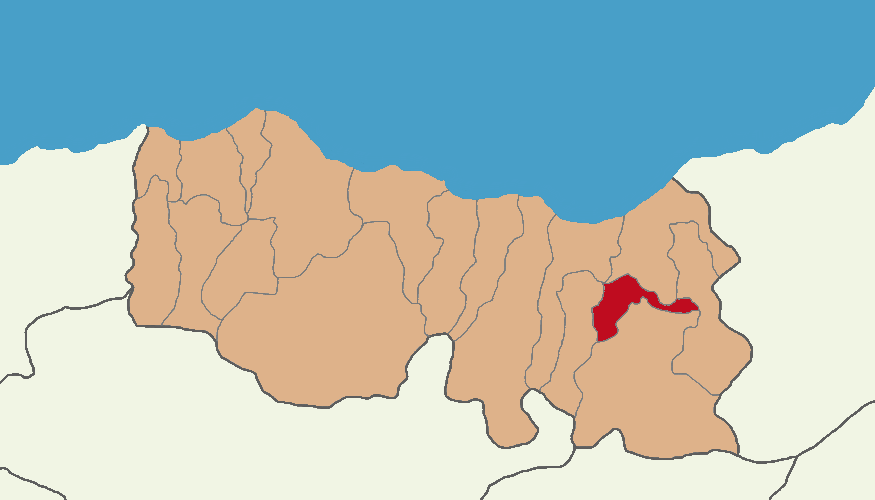
- Map showing Dernekpazarı District in Trabzon Province

- Location within Turkey
- Coordinates: 40°48′N 40°14′E
- Country: Turkey
- Province: Trabzon

Government
  - Mayor: Mehmet Aşık (AKP)
- Area: 89 km^{2} (34 sq mi)
- Population (2022): 3,761
  - Density: 42/km^{2} (110/sq mi)
- Time zone: UTC+3 (TRT)
- Postal code: 61950
- Area code: 0462
- Climate: Cfa
- Website: www.dernekpazari.bel.tr

Dernekpazarı (formerly: Kondu, Kondualtı) is a municipality and district of Trabzon Province, Turkey. Its area is 89 km^{2}, and its population is 3,761 (2022). The current mayor of the town is Mehmet Aşık (AKP). Dernekpazarı is part of the Solaklı river valley system; it lies between the coastal Of district and the alpine Çaykara district.

== History ==
The history of Dernekpazarı is closely related to the history of the Trabzon, the largest city of the Black Sea Region. Depending who ruled the Trabzon Province, the hill country came under Roman, Byzantine and Ottoman sovereignty. The population consisted largely of Pontic Greeks who converted to Islam during the 17th and 18th centuries. Currently the Of dialect of Pontic Greek (locally called 'Romeyka') is still spoken in the villages and nearly all locally current place names are in Greek. A few residents of the district who retained their Christian faith at the beginning of the 20th century were resettled in the town of Nea Trapezounta, near Katerini in Greece, in the wake of the population exchange between Greece and Turkey in 1923.

== Composition ==
There are 14 neighbourhoods in Dernekpazarı District (Pontic Greek names in brackets):

- Akköse (Ζένο)
- Çalışanlar (Καλανός)
- Çayırbaşı (Χαβάσο)
- Gülen (Βυζίρ)
- Günebakan (Ζενόζενα)
- Güney
- Kondu (Κοντού)
- Merkez
- Ormancık (Μακιδάνος)
- Taşçılar (Φώτγκενε)
- Tüfekçi (Αρσέλα)
- Yenicami
- Yenice (Μαρλαδάς)
- Zincirlitaş (Βετζονά)
