= Fatih Öztürk =

Fatih Öztürk may refer to:

- Fatih Öztürk (footballer, born 1983), Turkish football goalkeeper
- Fatih Öztürk (footballer, born 1986), French football goalkeeper
