= Uzungöl =

Lake in Turkey

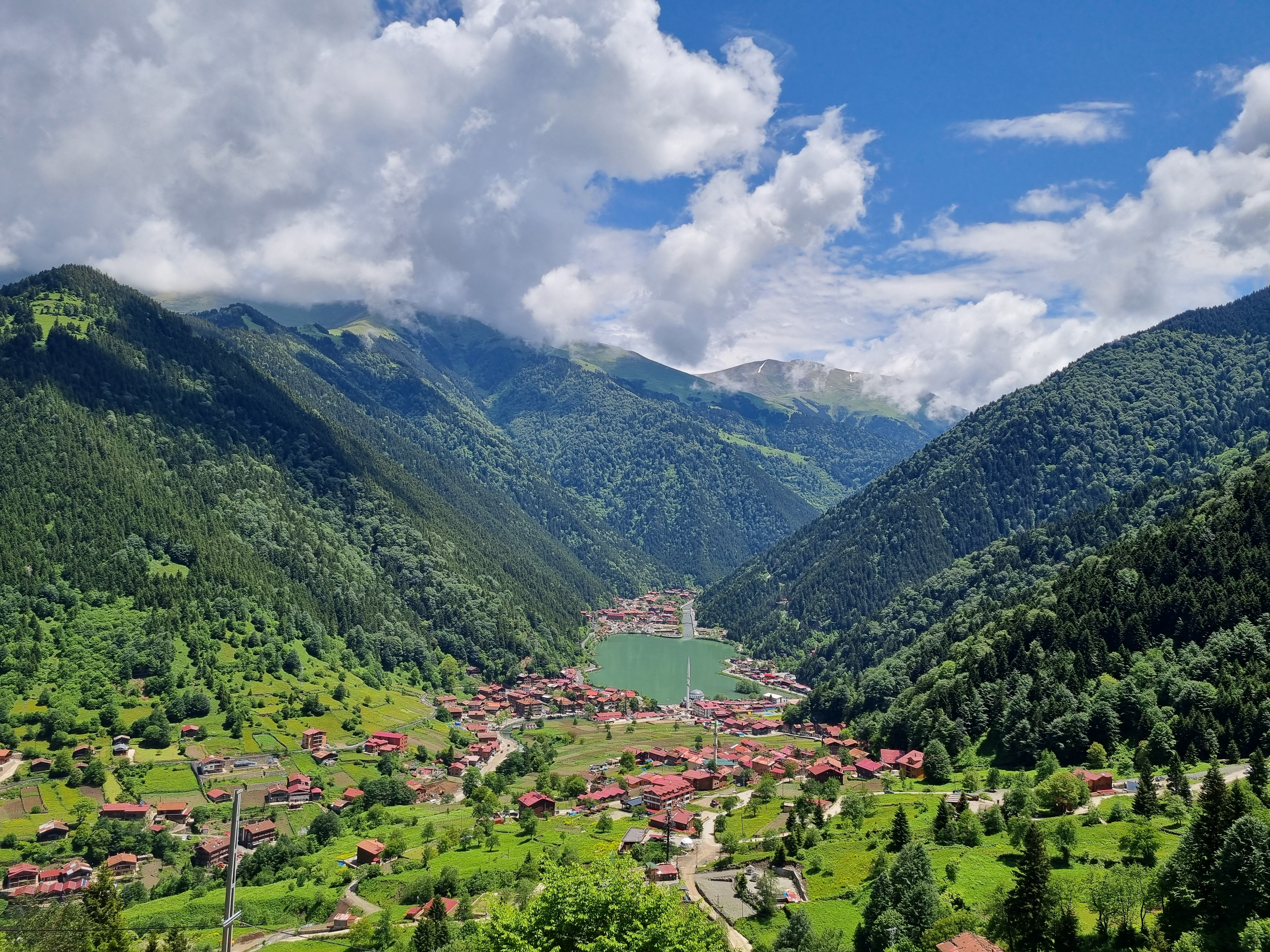
- Uzungöl

- Location within Turkey
- Coordinates: 40°37′9″N 40°17′42″E
- Primary inflows: Haldizen Stream
- Basin countries: Turkey
- Website: uzungol.net.tr

Uzungöl (lit. 'Long Lake'), or in the local Romeyka language: Şeraho, is a lake situated to the south of the city of Trabzon, in the Çaykara district of Trabzon Province, Turkey. Uzungöl is also the name of the village on the lake's coast. Over the years, the picturesque lake, its village and the surrounding valley have become popular tourist attractions. The lake is at a distance of 95 km south east of Trabzon's city center, and 19 km from Çaykara's district center. It was formed by a landslide, which transformed the stream bed into a natural dam, in the valley of the Haldizen Stream. Uzungöl is a part of Uzungöl Nature Park, which was declared on October 3, 1989.

The area is most famous for its natural environment. Located in a valley between high rising mountains, the lake and village at first appear inaccessible. The surrounding mountain forests and fog, occasionally enveloping the lake at night, also add to the scenery.

The tourist boom of the recent years has attracted investors, who opened a number of hotels, restaurants, and souvenir shops in the village. The transport infrastructure has also been improved. In 2008, the government built a concrete barrier along the lake's shoreline, so that its waves would not wet the coastal roads around it. This has triggered protests by the locals, as well as ecologists concerned with environmental damage, who stated that it has turned the lake into a giant artificial pool.

== See also ==
- Çaykara
- Trabzon Province
- Pontic Mountains
