= Tüfekçi, Dernekpazarı =

Tüfekçi
- Neighbourhood
- Country: Turkey
- Province: Trabzon
- District: Dernekpazarı
- Population (2022): 156
- Time zone: UTC+3 (TRT)

Tüfekçi (Pontic: Αρσέλα) is a neighbourhood of the municipality and district of Dernekpazarı, Trabzon Province, Turkey. Its population is 156 (2022).

"Tüfekçi" literally means "riflemen" or "gunsmith" in Turkish, evidently referring to the profession of at least some early inhabitants of the village.

Tüfekçi's older name was Arsela. Perhaps coincidentally, a village named Arşela existed on the west coast of the Black Sea.

Arsela is a place that was mentioned in a panegyric text written for the Thracian god Sabazius. It takes the form of Arselenos on another epitaph, which was found in Nova Zagora.

Ivan Duridanov has claimed that the river names Arsio, Arse in Old Prussia, Arsen and Arsia in Latvia and Arsina in Germany are derivation of the root ors-, ers “(for water) flow, damp” in the Indo-European language family (Hindi arşati) and ars- in the Thracian language.

He connected these words to place names such as Arsa, Arsaza, Arsena, Arsila in Dacia (an ancient region in Romania covering territories north and west of Arsela) (Duridanov, 1976).

A more recent use of the name is Arsela Peak in Antarctica, named after the named after the Thracian settlement of Arsela in Southern Bulgaria.
