= Örtülü, Of =

Örtülü
- Neighbourhood
- Country: Turkey
- Province: Trabzon
- District: Of
- Population (2022): 204
- Time zone: UTC+3 (TRT)

Örtülü is a neighbourhood of the Laz-inhabited municipality and district of Of, Trabzon Province, Turkey. Its population is 204 (2022). The village is located 10 kilometres (6.2 mi) east from Of.

Name of the village was Lazandoz.
