= Korinos =

Town in Pieria, Greece

Korinos Κορινός
- Municipal unit
- Location within the regional unit

- Location within Greece
- Coordinates: 40°19′N 22°35′E
- Country: Greece
- Administrative region: Central Macedonia
- Regional unit: Pieria
- Municipality: Katerini

Area
  - Municipal unit: 70.909 km^{2} (27.378 sq mi)
  - Community: 30.726 km^{2} (11.863 sq mi)
- Elevation: 35 m (115 ft)

Population (2021)
  - Municipal unit: 4,488
  - Municipal unit density: 63.29/km^{2} (163.9/sq mi)
  - Community: 3,153
  - Community density: 102.6/km^{2} (265.8/sq mi)
- Time zone: UTC+2 (EET)
  - Summer (DST): UTC+3 (EEST)
- Postal code: 600 62
- Area code: 23510
- Vehicle registration: KN

Korinos (Greek: Κορινός) is a town and a former municipality in Pieria regional unit, Greece. Since the 2011 local government reform it is part of the municipality Katerini, of which it is a municipal unit (Kallikratis Programme). The municipal unit has an area of 70.909 km^{2}, the community 30.726 km^{2}. Korinos has approximately 4,500 residents and it is located 5 km northeast of the city of Katerini (Κατερίνη), the capital of Pieria. The A1 motorway (Athens–Thessaloniki–Evzonoi) is situated to the west. Korinos is famous for its beaches -lying to its east- and hotels in the area, which make the village an ideal place for tourism.

Additionally, Korinos has a public library since 2006, Municipal Library of Korinos, and a weather station provided by the National Observatory of Athens and supervised by Municipality of Katerini.

Korinos became famous in Greece, after an economic scandal (during 2000) concerning the distribution of building grounds from Korinos' municipality to the villagers.

In Fascist Italy, rumours that the people of Korinos had "supernatural faculties" were taken seriously by some Italian racial theorists, who believed the town's inhabitants had successfully predicted the Italo-Ethiopian War.

== Name ==
Although the word "Korinos" does not have any meaning in the Greek language and its origin is unknown, there are several different explanations for this name. According to one of them, Korinos was named after the many Korinia (Κορίνεια) trees existed in the area during its foundation (approximately 1900). The second explanation is that Korinos was named after a general. Finally, some people believe that the name originates from the word "καρίνα" (keel), because Korinos Beach was a constructing place for keels.

== Subdivisions ==
The municipal unit Korinos is subdivided into the following communities (constituent villages in brackets):

- Kato Agios Ioannis
- Korinos (Korinos, Paralia Korinou)
- Koukkos
- Nea Trapezounta
- Sevasti

== Historical population ==
Year	Settlement population	Community population	Municipal unit population
1981	-	3,185	-
1991	3,705	-	5,757
2001	4,054	4,097	6,611
2011	3,487	3,543	5,557
2021	3,115	3,153	4,488

== History ==
Korinos was liberated by the Greek Army and after the end of the Balkan Wars, it finally became a part of Greece after nearly five centuries of Ottoman Rule.

== Notable people ==
- Dorothea Poimenidou (1995), archer, 4th place Tokyo 2020 Paralympic Games, 9th place Paris 2024 Paralympic Games

== See also ==
- Paralia Korinou
- Korinos railway station
- Macedonian Tombs, Korinos
- List of settlements in the Pieria regional unit
