= Sevasti =

Sevasti Σεβαστή
- Community
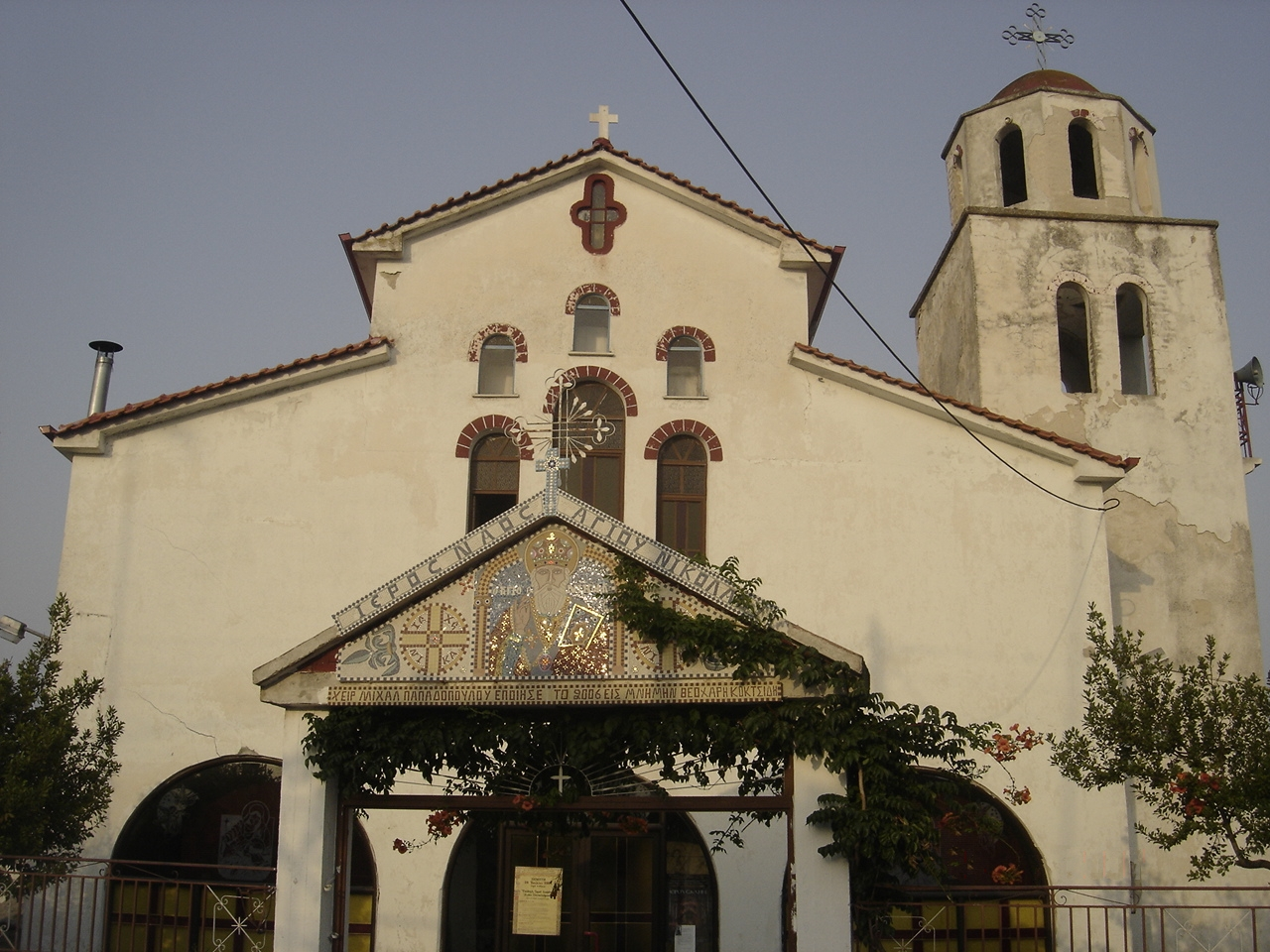
- The Greek Orthodox in Sevasti.

- Location within Greece
- Coordinates: 40°21.5′N 22°32.5′E
- Country: Greece
- Administrative region: Central Macedonia
- Regional unit: Pieria
- Municipality: Katerini
- Municipal unit: Korinos
- Elevation: 140 m (460 ft)

Population (2021)
  - Community: 287
- Time zone: UTC+2 (EET)
  - Summer (DST): UTC+3 (EEST)
- Postal code: 601 00
- Area code: +30-2351
- Vehicle registration: KN

Sevasti (Greek: Σεβαστή) is a village and a community of the Katerini municipality. Before the 2011 local government reform it was part of the municipality of Korinos, of which it was a municipal district. The 2021 census recorded 287 residents in the village.

== Population ==
The village was settled by Pontic Greek refugees from Turkey in 1924.

== Religion ==
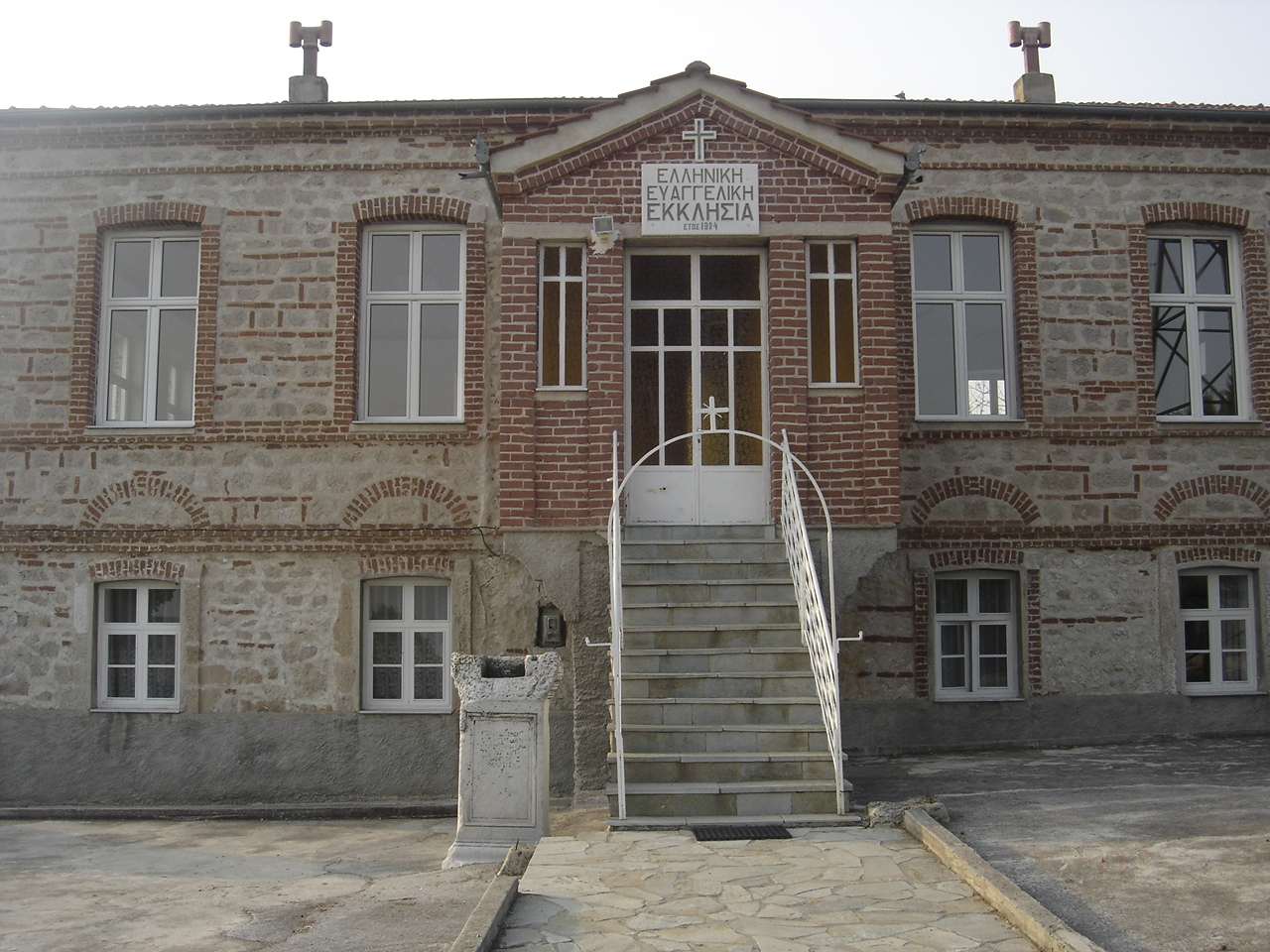
The temple of the Greek Evangelical Church in Sevasti.

Unlike other settlements in Greece, Sevasti has, besides Greek Orthodox, two Protestant communities and there is also a temple of the Greek Evangelical Church, that was established in 1924. There is also a community that follows the Greek Apostolic Church of Pentecost.

== See also ==
- List of settlements in the Pieria regional unit
