= Paralia Korinou =

Paralia Korinou Παραλία Κορινού
- Settlement
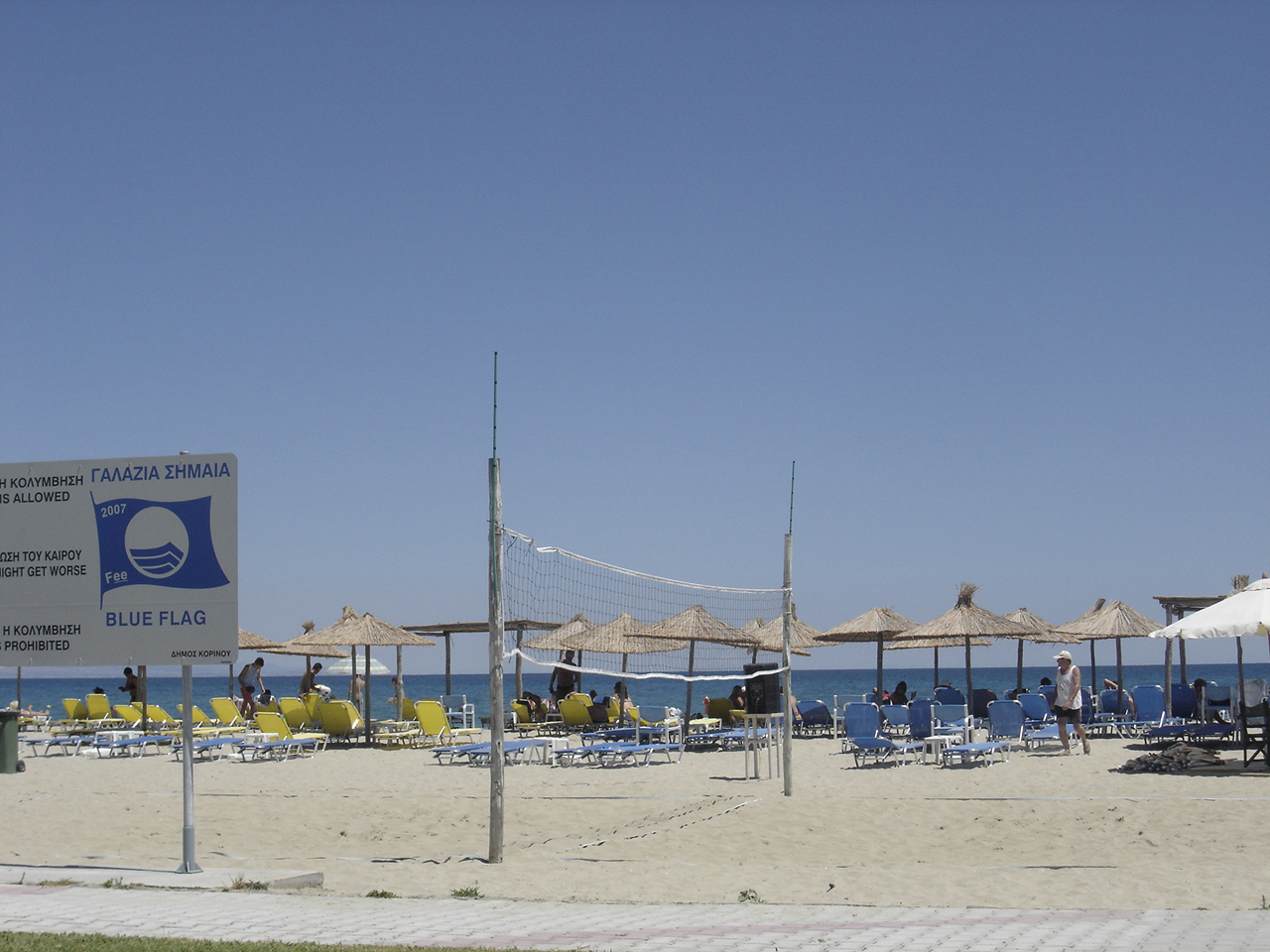
- The beach in Paralia Korinou

- Location within Greece
- Coordinates: 40°18.3′N 22°37′E
- Country: Greece
- Administrative region: Central Macedonia
- Regional unit: Pieria
- Municipality: Katerini
- Municipal unit: Korinos
- Community: Korinos
- Elevation: 3 m (9.8 ft)

Population (2021)
  - Total: 38
- Time zone: UTC+2 (EET)
  - Summer (DST): UTC+3 (EEST)
- Postal code: 600 62
- Area code: +30-2351
- Vehicle registration: KN

Paralia Korinou (Greek: Παραλία Κορινού) is a village of the Katerini municipality. Before the 2011 local government reformation it was part of the municipality of Korinos. The 2021 census recorded 38 inhabitants in the village. Paralia Korinou is a part of the community of Korinos.

== See also ==
- List of settlements in the Pieria regional unit
