= Of, Trabzon =

Of
- District and municipality
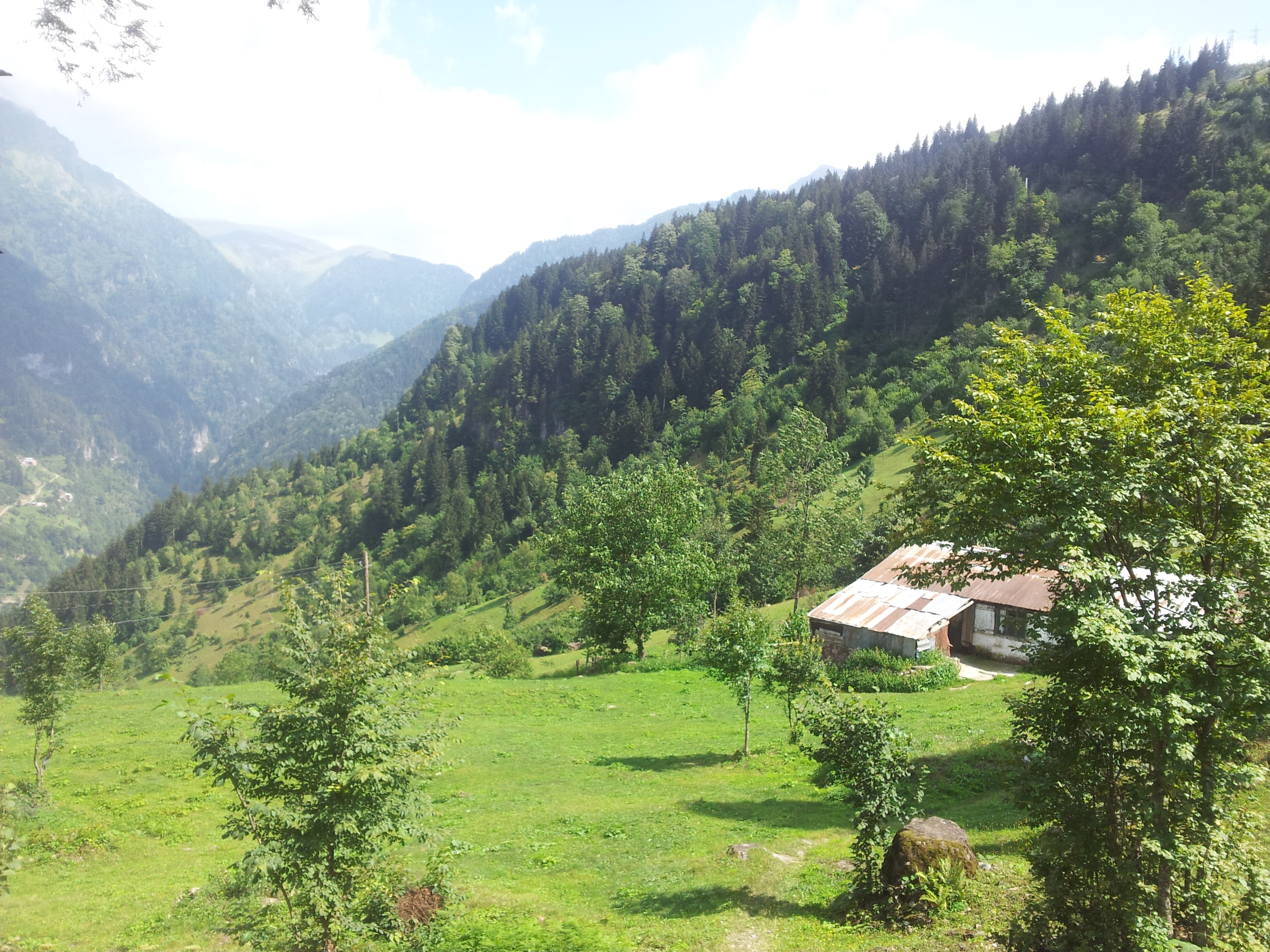

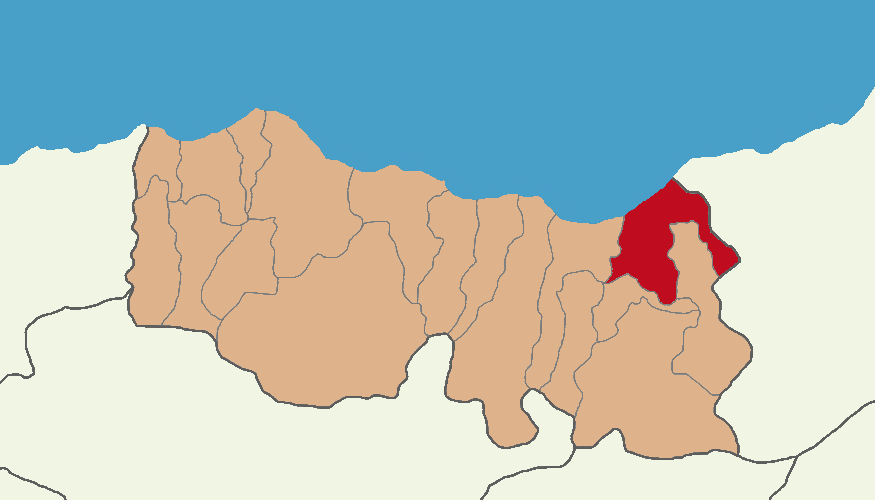
- Map showing Of District in Trabzon Province

- Location within Turkey
- Coordinates: 40°56′42″N 40°15′52″E
- Country: Turkey
- Province: Trabzon

Government
  - Mayor: Salim Salih Sarıalioğlu (AKP)
- Area: 258 km^{2} (100 sq mi)
- Elevation: 10 m (33 ft)
- Population (2022): 43,591
  - Density: 169/km^{2} (438/sq mi)
- Time zone: UTC+3 (TRT)
- Postal code: 61830
- Area code: 0462
- Climate: Cfa
- Website: www.of.bel.tr

Of (Turkish: [of]) is a municipality and district of Trabzon Province, Turkey. Its area is 258 km^{2}, and its population is 43,591 (2022). It is located in the eastern part of the province and is an important historical district of the province. The mayor is Salim Salih Sarıalioğlu (AKP).

== Etymology ==
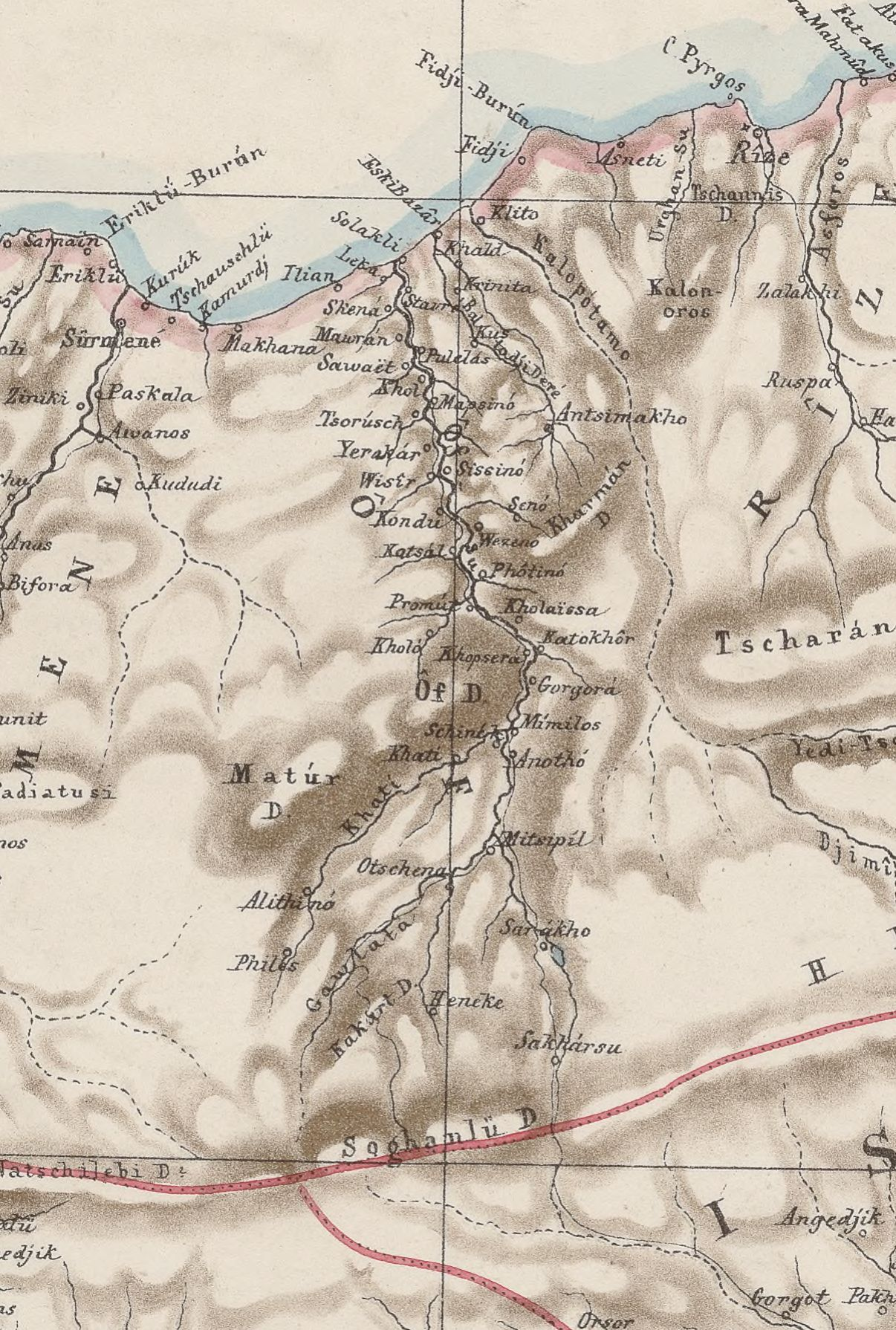
Section of an 1877 map showing the original names of towns and villages in the Of region

There are several stories about the origins of Of's name. Of was called Ofis in 1910 by Pontic Greek-speaking inhabitants. According to another view, it means 'village' or 'settlement' in the Laz language (ოფუტე, oput'e), as the old name of the town is mentioned as Opiunte on the Tabula Peutingeriana. By another version of events, the city got its name from a nearby river described by Arrian as Ophis, a Greek word for 'snake'. The Ophius stream, which snakes (zigzags) its way from around 3300 meters altitude in the Pontic Mountains towards the coastal town of Of, was renamed Solaklı during the 1950s Turkification process, which is a common policy in all of Turkey.

== History ==
Ophius was a known harbor during ancient times. The area was inhabited by the native Colchian people.

Mixed farming settlements of Pontic Greeks were established along most bends of the river at least from the Middle Ages onwards, making it one of the most densely settled valley-systems on the southern coast of the Black Sea. During most of its history the district and its hinterland were subjugated to nearby Trabzon. The southern districts Dernekpazarı, Çaykara and Hayrat of Trabzon province and the western half of İkizdere district today part of Rize province were historically part of the region of Of.

The defter of 1515 records 60 settlements in the Of area and 2601 taxable families out of which 51 (almost 2%) are recorded as belonging to Muslims while the rest 2550 (98%) are recorded as Christian. However, the defter of 1583 shows a sharp increase in Muslim presence with 991 out of 4159 families or 24% of the population. During that time many Christians began retreating to the upper valley highlands away from areas showing an increase in Muslim presence.

While the last quarter of the 16th century saw an acceleration in the growth of the number of Muslims, it was during the years of the 17th century that the region began its transformation into a bastion of Sunni Islam.

Until the 1923 population exchange between Greece and Turkey, the river Ophis (now Solakli) was a natural border between Muslim Greek and Orthodox Christian Greek settlements. The settlements inhabited by Orthodox Christian Greeks were Halt (Sogutlu), Zourel (Sarakoy), Kourits (Sivrice), Krinita (Catalsogut), Kofkia (Yaniktas), Giga (Yiga), Zisino (Bolumlu) and Leka (Camli). Despite their religious differences everyone spoke Ophitic Greek, a dialect of Pontic Greek.

After the population exchange, refugees from the Of area were resettled in Northern Greece, mainly in the areas of Drama, Kilkis and Kozani. In 1926 a group of these refugees purchased land near Katerini and 2 years later in 1928 founded Nea Trapezounta one of only a handful of purely Ophitic refugee villages.

A minority of Muslim Pontic Greek speakers, using the Ophitic dialect (or Romeyka), still live in the area.

== Composition ==
There are 68 neighbourhoods in Of District:

- Ağaçbaşı
- Ağaçseven
- Aşağıkışlacık
- Ballıca
- Barış
- Başköy
- Bayırca
- Birlik
- Bölümlü
- Çaltılı
- Çamlı
- Çamlıtepe
- Çataldere
- Çatalsöğüt
- Çukurova
- Cumapazarı
- Cumhuriyet
- Dağalan
- Darılı
- Dereköy
- Doğançay
- Dumlusu
- Erenköy
- Esenköy
- Eskipazar
- Fındıkoba
- Gökçeoba
- Gümüşören
- Güresen
- Gürpınar
- İkidere
- İrfanlı
- Kaban
- Karabudak
- Kavakpınar
- Kazançlı
- Keler
- Kirazköy
- Kireçli
- Kıyıboyu
- Kıyıcık
- Korkut
- Korucuk
- Kumludere
- Örtülü
- Ovacık
- Pınaraltı
- Saraçlı
- Sarayköy
- Sarıbey
- Sarıkaya
- Sefaköy
- Serince
- Sıraağaç
- Sivrice
- Soğukpınar
- Söğütlü
- Sugeldi
- Sulaklı
- Tavşanlı
- Tekoba
- Uğurlu
- Uluağaç
- Yanıktaş
- Yazlık
- Yemişalan
- Yenimahalle
- Yukarıkışlacık

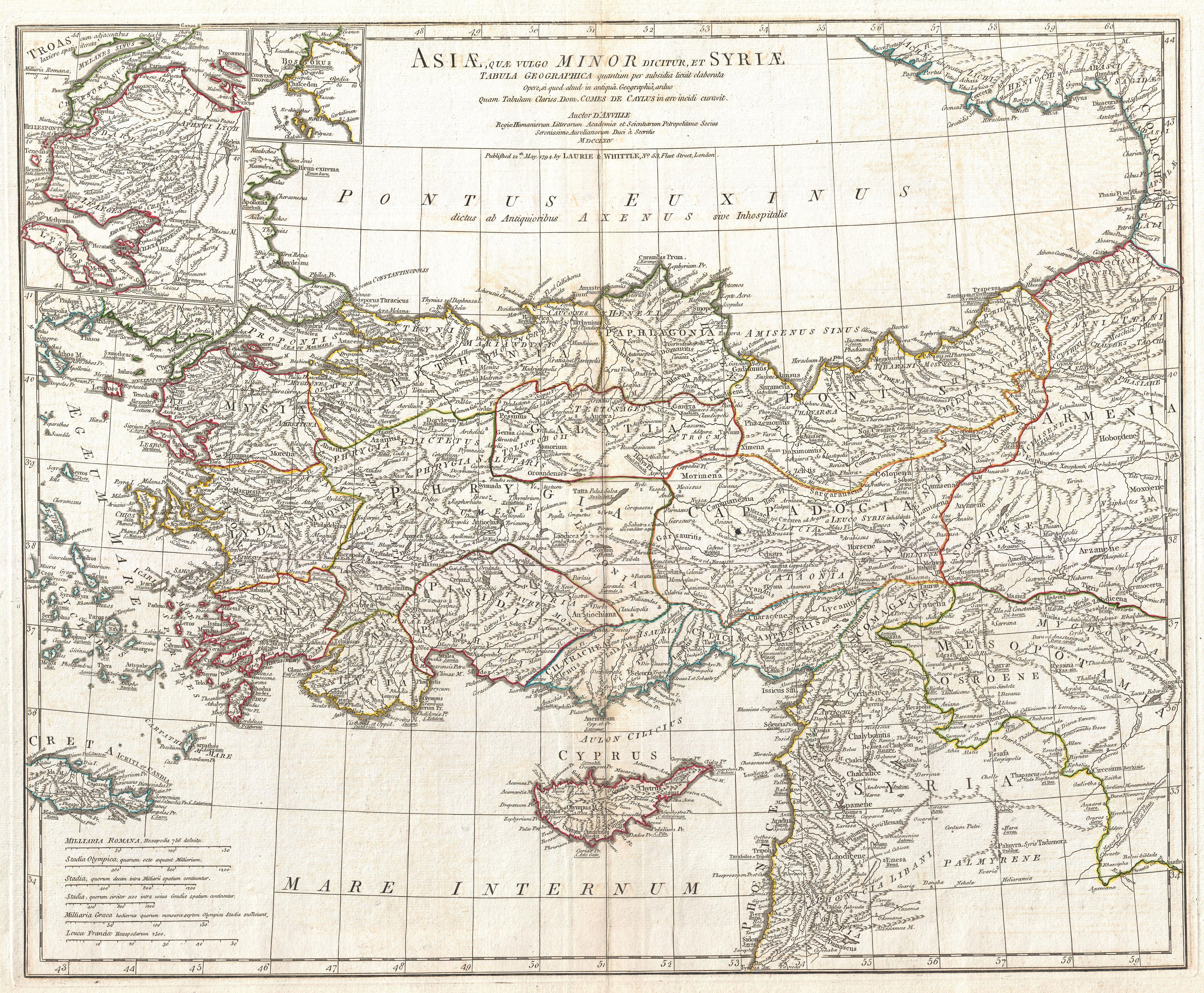
A detailed map of Asia Minor in antiquity by J. B. Bourguignon d'Anville (1794)

== Notable people ==
- Ali Ağaoğlu (1959), businessman
- Erdoğan Bayraktar, politician, ex-Minister of Environment and Urban Planning of Turkey
- Fatih Çakıroğlu (1981), European champion in wrestling
- Hasan Küçükakyüz (1957), commander of the Turkish Air Force
- Fatih Öztürk (1983), football player
- Mustafa Varank (1976), Minister of Industry and Technology
- Mehmet Yılmaz (1979), football player
- Mahmut Ustaosmanoğlu (1927), famous Sunni cleric and Naqshbandi Sufi leader

== See also ==
- Çakıroğlu İsmail Ağa Konağı
