= Çakıroğlu İsmail Ağa Konağı =

Coordinates: 40°55′15″N 40°21′33″E

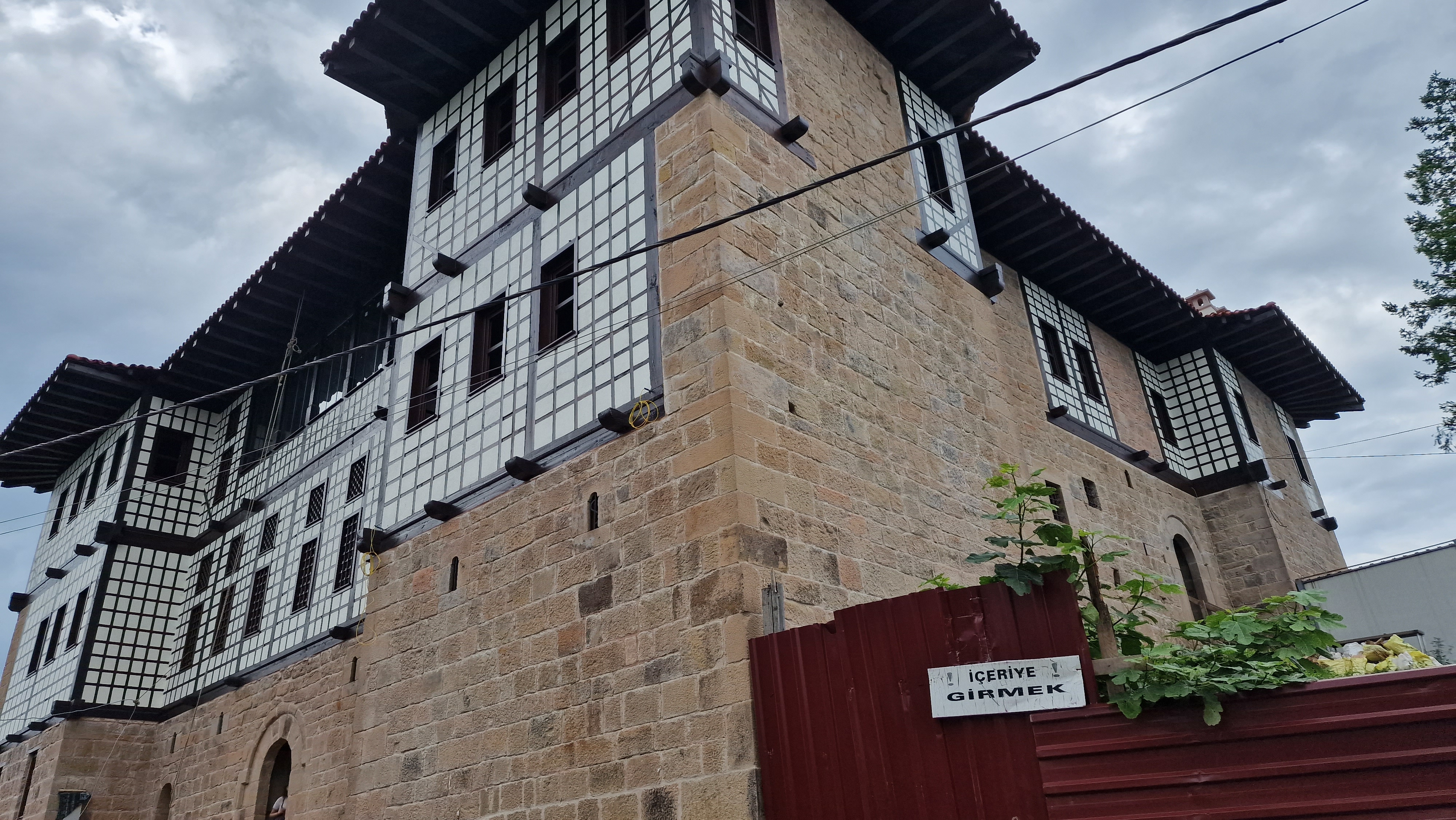
Çakıroğlu İsmail Ağa Konağı in Of, Trabzon

The Çakıroğlu İsmail Ağa Konağı is a mansion built on behalf of Çakıroğlu İsmail Ağa in Of, Trabzon, Turkey. The year of construction is unknown. On one of the fireplaces is the year "1235 H", equivalent to 1805 AD. 40 masters are said to have been involved in the construction and it is considered to be the lagerst sandstone mansion in the Turkish Black Sea Region.

== The structure of the building ==
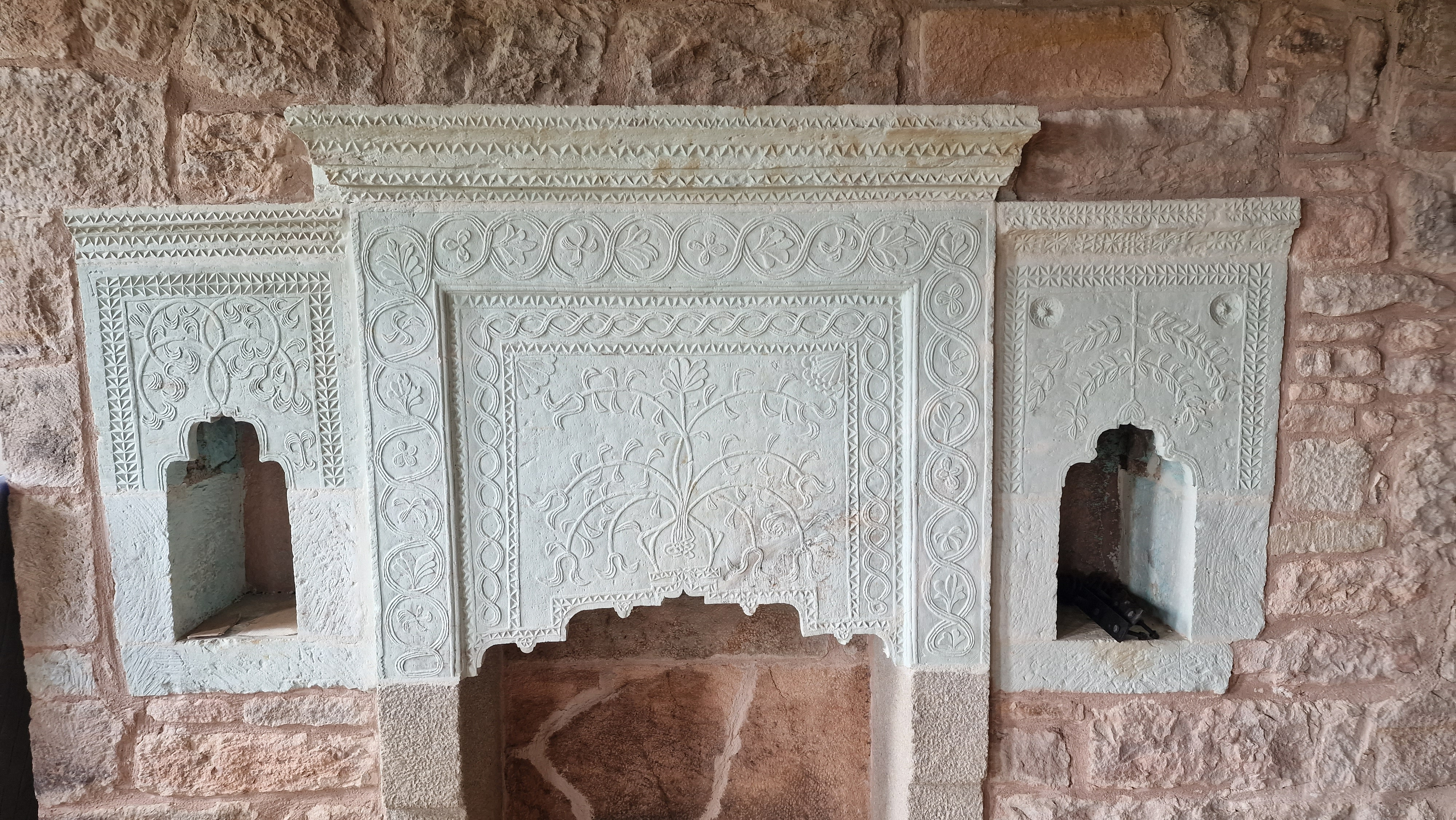
One of the decorated fireplaces of Çakıroğlu İsmail Ağa Konağı

The building, which consists mainly of pink sandstone, was built on a hill with sea views. The mansion has an area of 529 m² and has a living area of approximately 1500 m². The northern side of the building faces the sea. There are two floors with small windows. To the South, the building consists of three floors. The second and third floors are decorated with woodwork. The main gates are facing west and east. On the south side there is a third door in the middle. In addition, a gate for the horses is installed on the east side.

Guests were accommodated on the west side in a separate room and next to it was an armory. The kitchen and a spacious courtyard with two entrances are located in the middle floor. On the upper floor are more living spaces. In addition there is a prison cell on the lower floor of the mansion. Furthermore there are also a library, a farm and assembly rooms in the building.

== History ==
During the conflict between the Hazinedaroğlu and Tuzcuoğlu families, which later developed into the Laz rebellion (1832-1834), the derebey Tuzcuoğlu Memiş Ağa sought refuge with Çakıroğlu İsmail Ağa in 1817.

In World War I, the mansion was shelled by Russian warships, but was hardly damaged. The building was registered as a historical work and is currently in need to refurbishment.

In 2017, Çakıroğlu Educational and Cultural Association handed over the mansion to Trabzon Province in the presence of Turkish Interior Minister Süleyman Soylu. The building is to be restored and will function as an inn.

The project planning for the restoration was completed in 2018 and the restoration work on the mansion has been in progress since 2019.
