= Fatih Öztürk (footballer, born 1983) =

Turkish footballer

Personal information
- Full name: Fatih Öztürk
- Date of birth: 14 June 1983 (age 43)
- Place of birth: Of, Trabzon, Turkey
- Height: 1.89 m (6 ft 2 in)
- Position: Goalkeeper

Team information
- Current team: Hatayspor

Youth career
- 1999–2000: Gürbulakspor
- 2000–2002: Ofspor

Senior career*
Years	Team	Apps	(Gls)
2002–2005	Ofspor	4	(0)
2005–2011	Karabükspor	9	(0)
2006–2007	→ Tarim Kredispor (loan)	20	(0)
2009–2010	→ Pursaklarspor (loan)	34	(0)
2011	Bugsaşspor	1	(0)
2012	Fethiyespor	12	(0)
2012–2019	Gaziosmanpaşaspor	14	(0)
- Nazilli Belediyespor
- Payasspor
- Hatayspor
- Körfez Spor Kulübü
2019-	Yomraspor		
- * Club domestic league appearances and goals as of 17 February 2013

Fatih Öztürk (born 14 June 1983) is a Turkish professional football goalkeeper who is currently playing for TFF Third League team Yomraspor.

== Club career ==
Öztürk played for Gürbulakspor and Ofspor before he joined Karabükspor in 2005. He has spent seasons on loan with Tarim Kredispor and Pursaklarspor. He now plays for Yomraspor.
