= Bucak (administrative unit) =

Turkish word for subdistrict

Bucak (nahiya) is the Turkish word for subdistrict, literally meaning "corner." In principle, all Turkish provinces (Turkish: il) are divided into districts (Turkish: ilçe), and the districts were then divided into bucaks. Thus, bucak was the third-level administrative unit in Turkey. Despite this designation, about half the districts had no bucaks. For example, in Konya Province (the province with the highest number of settlements), among the 31 districts, only 15 districts had bucaks, and the total number of bucaks was 23. However, there was only one bucak in Yalova Province. The total number of bucaks in Turkey was 634. Villages (Turkish: köy) are parts of the districts or bucaks.

Bucaks were important part of the Turkish administrative system prior to 1970, but since transportation facilities to villages were improved, the importance of bucaks declined.

Until 2014, bucaks were almost defunct, but their legal entity continued. According to 2012 law 6360, bucaks as well as villages in 30 provinces were abolished, but the legal entity of bucak in other (51) provinces continued to exist. (See Metropolitan municipalities in Turkey) With changes approved on 11 September 2014, all bucaks were abolished.
