= Çakıroğlu (surname) =

Çakıroğlu is a surname. Notable people with the surname include:

- Buse Naz Çakıroğlu (born 1996), Turkish boxer
- Damla Çakıroğlu (born 1994), Turkish volleyball player
- Fatih Çakıroğlu (born 1981), Turkish wrestler
- Fırat Çakıroğlu (1991–2015), Turkish nationalist student and murder victim
- Hüseyin Çakıroğlu (1957–1986), Turkish footballer
- Temel Çakiroglu (born 1959), Turkish judoka
