= Nea Trapezounta, Pieria =

Village in Central Macedonia, Greece

Nea Trapezounta Νέα Τραπεζούντα
- Community
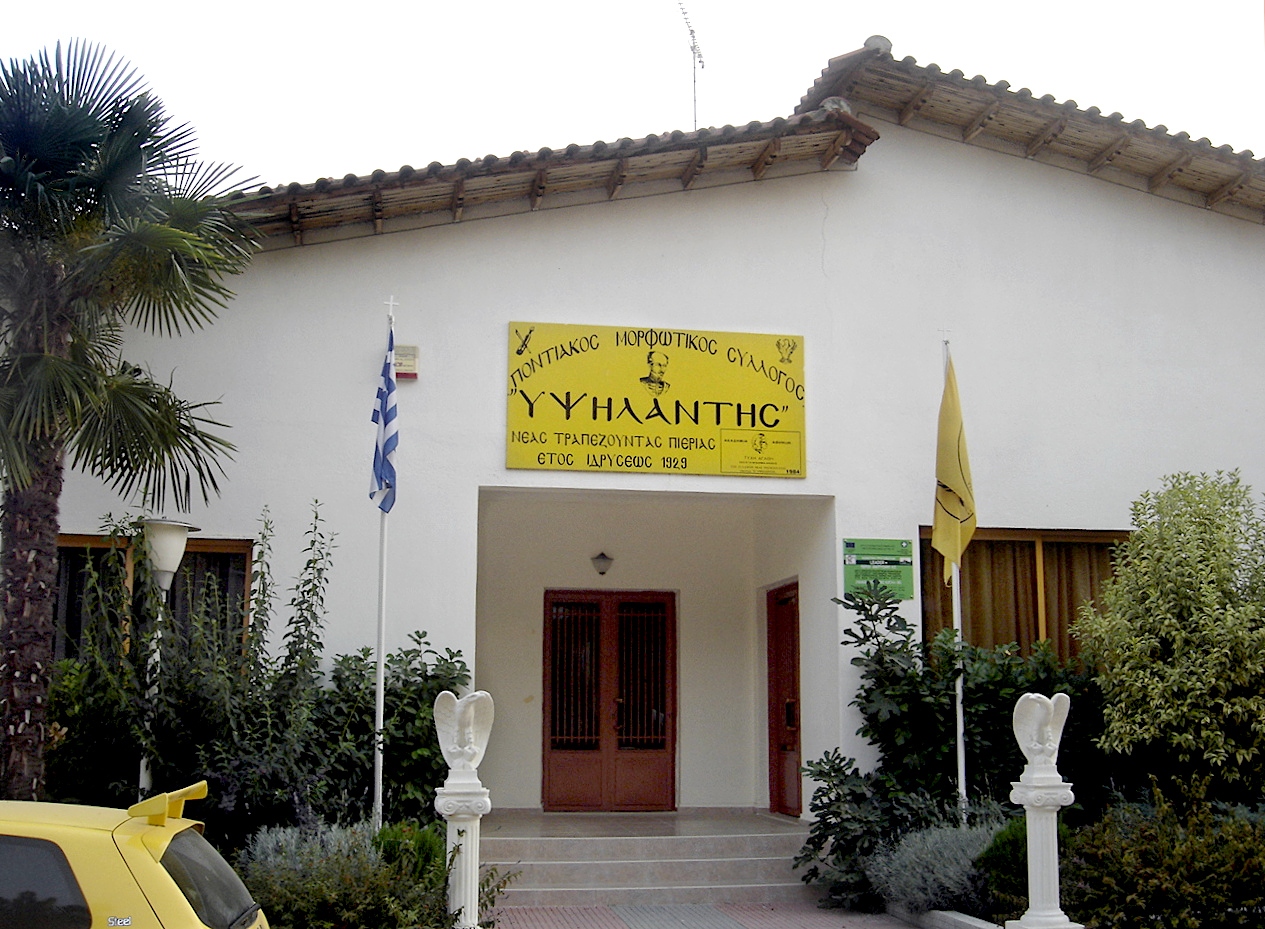
- The cultural club of Nea Trapezounta in 2007

- Location within Greece
- Coordinates: 40°20′N 22°31.5′E
- Country: Greece
- Administrative region: Central Macedonia
- Regional unit: Pieria
- Municipality: Katerini
- Municipal unit: Korinos

Area
  - Community: 6.547 km^{2} (2.528 sq mi)
- Elevation: 130 m (430 ft)

Population (2021)
  - Community: 396
  - Density: 60.5/km^{2} (157/sq mi)
- Time zone: UTC+2 (EET)
  - Summer (DST): UTC+3 (EEST)
- Postal code: 601 00
- Area code: +30-2351
- Vehicle registration: KN

Nea Trapezounta (Greek: Νέα Τραπεζούντα, Nea Trapezunda) is a village and a community of the Katerini municipality. Before the 2011 local government reform, it was part of the municipality of Korinos, of which it was a municipal district. The 2021 census recorded 396 residents in the village. The community of Nea Trapezounta covers an area of 6.547 km^{2}.

== History ==
The village was founded by Pontic Greek refugees from the Of valley in Turkey, and was named after Trabzon (Trapezounta in Greek).

== See also ==
- List of settlements in the Pieria regional unit
