= Pontic Greek =

Variety of modern Greek

- Pontic
- ποντιακά, ρωμαίικα
- Region: originally the Pontus on the Black Sea coast; Greece, Russia, Anatolia, Ukraine, (Note: However, linguists studying the language became victims of Stalin's repressions by 1937, and the research on the variety did not resume until the 1950s and 1960s.) Georgia, and Turkey
- Ethnicity: Pontic Greeks
- Native speakers: 778,000 (2009–2015)
- Language family: Indo-European: Hellenic; Greek; (disputed); Attic–Ionic; Attic; Koine; Asia Minor Greek; Pontic Greek
- Dialects: Mariupolitan?; Ophitic
- Writing system: Greek, Latin, Cyrillic

Language codes
- ISO 639-3: pnt
- Glottolog: pont1253
- ELP: Pontic
- Linguasphere: 56-AAA-aj
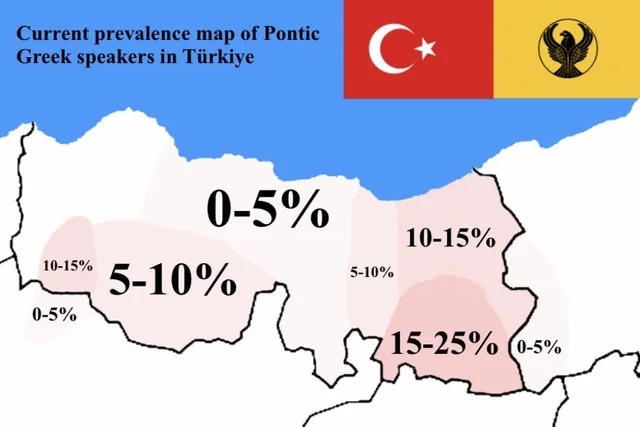
- Current prevalence map of Pontic Greek speakers in Turkey

- Pontic Greek is classified as Definitely Endangered by the UNESCO Atlas of the World's Languages in Danger (2010).

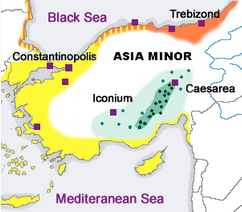
Anatolian Greek dialects until 1923; Demotic in yellow. Pontic in orange. Cappadocian in green, with green dots indicating individual Cappadocian Greek villages in 1910.

Pontic Greek (Pontic: Ρωμαίικα, romanized: Rhomaiika, (Note: Greek pronunciation: [roˈmeika]) Greek: Ποντιακά, romanized: Pontiaka; (Note: Greek pronunciation: [pondiaˈka]) Turkish: Rumca or Romeika), also referred to as Pontic, is a variety of Modern Greek indigenous to the Pontus region on the southern shores of the Black Sea, northeastern Anatolia, and the Eastern Turkish and Caucasus region. An endangered Greek language variety, Pontic Greek is spoken by about 778,000 people worldwide, who are known as Pontic or Pontian Greeks.

Like nearly all of Greek varieties spoken today, the linguistic lineage of Pontic Greek stems from the Hellenistic Koine, itself based on Attic–Ionic Greek, which later developed into the Byzantine Greek of the Middle Ages. Following its geographic isolation from the rest of the Greek–speaking world, Pontic continued to develop separately along with other Anatolian Greek dialects, like Cappadocian, from the 11th century onwards. As a result, Pontic Greek is not completely mutually intelligible with the standard Demotic Greek spoken in mainland Greece today. Pontic also contains influences from Russian, Turkish, Kartvelian (namely Laz and Georgian) and Armenian. Pontic itself has influenced Laz and northeastern dialects of Turkish.

Today, Pontians live predominantly in Northern Greece, following the 1923 population exchange between Greece and Turkey. Out of their total population, around 200,000–300,000 are considered active Pontic speakers. Pontic Greek is also spoken in Turkey, Russia, Georgia, Armenia, and Kazakhstan, as well as by the Pontic diaspora. It remains spoken in pockets of the Pontus region, mostly by Pontic Greek Muslims in the eastern districts of Trabzon Province. Pontic is primarily written in the Greek script; the Latin script is sporadically used in Turkey, while the Cyrillic alphabet is rarely used in Russia and former Soviet countries.

== Classification ==
Pontic Greek is classified as an Indo-European, Greek language of the Attic-Ionic branch.

== Name ==
Historically, the speakers of Pontic Greek referred to their language as Romeika, also spelled in Latin as Romeyka (Pontic: Ρωμαίικα); a historical and colloquial term also used for the Modern Greek language as a whole. Originating in Byzantine times, the term reflects the identification of the Greek–speaking Byzantine subjects as Rhomaioi (Ῥωμαῖοι) and the Medieval Greek language as Rhomaikḗ (Ῥωμαική). The term "Pontic" originated in scholarly usage, but it has been adopted as a mark of identity by Pontic Greeks living in Greece, where the language is commonly called Pontiaká (Greek: Ποντιακά). Pontians also refer to their language as Ποντιακόν λαλίαν Pontiakón lalían ('Pontic speech') and at times as Λαζικά Laziká. The variety is also called Ποντιακή διάλεκτος Pontiakḗ diálektos ('Pontic dialect') in standard modern Greek.

In Turkish, there is no special name for Pontic Greek; it is called Rumca ([ˈɾumd͡ʒa]), derived from the Turkish word Rum, denoting Byzantine Greeks. Nowadays, Pontic speakers living in Turkey call their language Romeyka, Urumce, Rumca or Rumcika.

== History ==
Similar to most modern Greek dialects, Pontic Greek is mainly derived from Koine Greek, which was spoken in the Hellenistic and Roman times between the 4th century BC and the 4th century AD. Following the Seljuk invasion of Asia Minor during the 11th century AD, Pontus became isolated from many of the regions of the Byzantine Empire. The Pontians remained somewhat isolated from the mainland Greeks, causing Pontic Greek to develop separately and distinctly from the rest of the mainland Greek. However, the dialect has also been influenced by the nearby Persian, Caucasian, and Turkish languages.

== Dialects ==
Greek linguist Manolis Triantafyllidis has divided the Pontic of Turkey into two groups:

- the Western group (Oinountiac or Niotika) around Oenoe (Turkish Ünye);
- the Eastern group, which is again subdivided into:
  - the coastal subgroup (Trapezountiac) around Trebizond (Ancient Greek Trapezous) and
  - the inland subgroup (Chaldiot) in Chaldia (around Argyroupolis (Gümüşhane) and Kanin in Pontic), its vicinity (Kelkit, Baibourt, etc.), and around Kotyora (Ordu).

Speakers of Chaldiot were the most numerous. In phonology, some varieties of Pontic are reported to demonstrate vowel harmony, a well-known feature of Turkish (Mirambel 1965).

Outside Turkey one can distinguish:

- the Northern group (Mariupol Greek or Rumeíka), originally spoken in Crimea, but now principally in Mariupol, where the majority of Crimean Pontic Greeks of the Rumaiic subgroup now live. Other Pontic Greeks speak Crimean Tatar as their mother tongue, and are classified as "Urums". There are approximately half a dozen dialects of Crimean (Mariupolitan) Pontic Greek spoken.
- Soviet Rumaiic, a Soviet variant of the Pontic Greek language spoken by the Pontic Greek population of the Soviet Union.

=== Ophitic ===
The inhabitants of the Of valley who had converted to Islam in the 17th century remained in Turkey and have partly retained the Pontic language until today. Their dialect, which forms part of the Trapezountiac subgroup, is called "Ophitic" by linguists, but speakers generally call it Romeika. As few as 5,000 people are reported to speak it. There are however estimates that show the real number of the speakers as considerably higher. Speakers of Ophitic/Romeyka are concentrated in the eastern districts of Trabzon province: Çaykara (Katohor), Dernekpazarı (Kondu), Sürmene (Sourmena) and Köprübaşı (Göneşera). Although less widespread, it is still spoken in some remote villages of the Of district itself. It is also spoken in the western İkizdere (Dipotamos) district of Rize province. Historically the dialect was spoken in a wider area, stretching further east to the port town of Pazar (Athina).

Ophitic has retained the infinitive, which is present in Ancient Greek but has been lost in other variants of Modern Greek (except Italiot Greek); it has therefore been characterized as "archaic" or conservative (even in relation to other Pontic dialects) and as the living language that is closest to Ancient Greek. Because a majority of the population of these districts converted to Islam during the 17th to 19th centuries, some Arabic and Turkish loanwords have been adopted in the language. According to Vahit Tursun, writer of the Romeika-Turkish dictionary, loanwords from the neighboring Laz speakers of Rize province are strikingly absent in the Romeika vocabulary of Trabzon natives.

A very similar dialect is spoken by descendants of Christians from the Of valley (especially from Kondu) now living in Greece in the village of Nea Trapezounta, Pieria, Central Macedonia, with about 400 speakers.

== Geographic distribution ==
Though Pontic was originally spoken on the southern shores of the Black Sea, from the 18th and 19th century and on substantial numbers migrated into the northern and eastern shores, into the Russian Empire. Pontic is still spoken by large numbers of people in Ukraine, mainly in Mariupol, but also in other parts of Ukraine such as the Odesa and Donetsk region, in Russia (around Stavropol) and Georgia. The language enjoyed some use as a literary medium in the 1930s, including a school grammar (Topkharas 1998 [1932]).

Though many were displaced as a result of Russia's 2022 invasion of Ukraine, as of 2024 the majority of Mariupol's Greeks have opted to remain in the city and its adjacent villages.

After the massacres of the 1910s, the majority of speakers remaining in Asia Minor were subject to the Treaty of Lausanne population exchange, and were resettled in Greece (mainly northern Greece). A second wave of migration occurred in the early 1990s, this time from countries of the former Soviet Union.

In urban areas in Greece the language is no longer spoken in daily life but in villages and towns with more homogeneous Pontic population, located mostly in the northern part of country, the language is still in active daily usage. Many radio stations broadcast in the Pontic language, and many associations exist for its safeguard.

- Greece: 400,000 speakers, mostly in Macedonia (East, Central and West) and in Attica
- Turkey: Unknown (certainly more than 5,000), mostly in eastern Black Sea Region and in Istanbul
  - Of-dialectical region:
    - Of: multiple villages
    - Çaykara: (24–70 villages)
    - Dernekpazarı: (13 villages)
    - Köprübaşı: (5 villages)
    - Sürmene: (31 villages)
  - To the west of Trabzon:
    - Maçka: A handful of villages, settled from the Of-Çaykara region
    - Tonya: (17 villages)
    - Beşikdüzü: 1 village
    - Giresun: (3 villages in Bulancak district)
    - Gümüşhane: Sparsely in Torul-ardasa, Yağlıdere-kromni, Dumanlı

== Official status ==
=== Greece ===
In Greece, Pontic has no official status, like all other Greek dialects.

=== Soviet Union ===
Historically, Pontic Greek was the de facto language of the Greek minority in the USSR, although in the Πανσυνδεσμιακή Σύσκεψη (Pansyndesmiakí Sýskepsi, All-Union Conference) of 1926, organised by the Greek–Soviet intelligentsia, it was decided that Demotic should be the official language of the community.

Later revival of Greek identity in the Soviet Union and post-Communist Russia saw a renewed division on the issue of Rumaiic versus Demotic. A new attempt to preserve a sense of ethnic Rumaiic identity started in the mid-1980s. The Ukrainian scholar Andriy Biletsky created a new Slavonic alphabet, but though a number of writers and poets make use of this alphabet, the population of the region rarely uses it.

== Culture ==
The language has a rich oral tradition and folklore and Pontic songs are particularly popular in Greece. There is also some limited production of modern literature in Pontic, including poetry collections (among the most renowned writers is Kostas Diamantidis), novels, and translated Asterix comic albums. The youth often speak standard Greek as their first language. The use of Pontic has been maintained more by speakers in North America than it has in Greece.

== Alphabets ==
Pontic, in Greece, is written in the Greek alphabet, with diacritics: σ̌ ζ̌ ξ̌ ψ̌ for /ʃ ʒ kʃ pʃ/, α̈ ο̈ for [æ ø] (phonological /ia io/). Pontic, in Turkey, is written in the Latin alphabet following Turkish conventions. In Russia, it is written in the Cyrillic alphabet. In early Soviet times, Pontic was written in the Greek alphabet phonetically, as shown below, using digraphs instead of diacritics; [æ ø] were written out as ια, ιο. The Pontic Wikipedia uses Greek script: it has adopted εα, εο for these vowels, to avoid clashes with Modern Greek ια, ιο, and uses digraphs from the Soviet system instead of diacritics, but otherwise follows historical orthography.

Greek alphabet	Turkish alphabet	Latin-English alphabet	Cyrillic alphabet	IPA	Example
Α α	A a	A a	А а	[ä]	ρωμαίικα, romeyika, romejika, ромейика
Β β	V v	B b/V v/W w	В в	[v]	κατηβαίνω, kativeno, katibënô, кативено
Γ γ	Ğ ğ	G g	Г г	[ɣ] [ʝ]	γανεύω, ğanevo, ganeyô, ганево
Δ δ	DH dh	D d	Д д	[ð]	δόντι, dhonti, dónti, донти
Ε ε	E e	E e	Е е	[e̞]	εγάπεσα, eğapesa, egápesa, егапеса
Ζ ζ	Z z	Z z	З з	[z]	ζαντός, zantos, zantóſ, зантос
Θ θ	TH th	TH th	С с, Ф ф, Т т	[θ]	θέκω, theko, þékô, теко
Ι ι	İ i	I i	И и	[i]	οσπιτόπον, ospitopon, ospitópon, оспитопон
Κ κ	K k	K k	К к	[k]	καλάτσ̌εμαν, kalaçeman, kalácheman, калачеман
Λ λ	L l	L l	Л л	[l]	λαλία, lalia, lalía, лалиа
Μ μ	M m	M m	М м	[m]	μάνα, mana, mána, мана
Ν ν	N n	N n	Н н	[n]	ολίγον, oliğоn, olígon, олигон
Ο ο	O o	O o	О о	[o̞]	τ'εμέτερον, themeteron, þeméteron, ҭеметерон
Π π	P p	Pp	П п	[p]	εγάπεσα, eğapesa, egápesa, егапеса
Ρ ρ	R r	R r	Р р	[ɾ]	ρωμαίικα, romeyika, romejika, ромейка
Σ ς	S s	S s	С с	[s]	ασπαλώ, aspalo, aspalō, аспaло
Χ̌ χ̌	Ş ş	SH sh	Ш ш	[ʃ]	χ̌έριν, şerin, shérin, шерин
Τ τ	T t	T t	Т т	[t]	νόστιμεσσα, nostimesa, nóstimesa, ностимеса
ΤΖ̌ τζ̌	C c	C c	Ц ц	[d͡ʒ]	κεμεντζ̌ έ, kemence, kemencé, кemenце
ΤΣ τς	Ç ç	CH ch	Ч ч	[t͡ʃ]	μανίτσα, maniça, manícha, манича
Υ υ	U u	U u/Y y	У у	[u]	υίαν, uian, uían, уи́aн
Φ φ	F f	F f	Ф ф	[f]	έμορφα, emorfa, émopfa,.эморфа
Χ χ	H h, KH kh	H h/X x	Х х	[x]	χάσον, hason, háson, хасон

== Archaisms ==
The following are features of Pontic Greek which have been retained from early forms of Greek, in contrast to the developments of Modern Greek.

=== Phonology ===
- The vowel "η" sometimes merged with "ε" rather than "ι" (κέπιν = κήπιον, κλέφτες = κλέπτης, συνέλικος = συνήλικος, νύφε = νύ(μ)φη, έγκα = ἤνεγκον, έτον = ἦτον, έκουσα = ἤκουσα etc.).
- The vowel "ω" merged with "o" even in those cases where Koine Greek received it as "ου" (ζωμίν = ζουμί, καρβώνι, ρωθώνι etc.).
- Preservation of the Ionic consonant pair "σπ" instead of Koine "σφ" (σποντύλιν, σπίγγω, σπιντόνα).

=== Declension of nouns and adjectives ===
- Preservation of the ancient nominative suffix "-ν" in neuter diminutive nouns from Ancient Greek "-ίον" (παιδίον, χωρίον; Pontic παιδίν, χωρίν).
- Preservation of the termination of feminine compound adjectives in -ος (η άλαλος, η άνοστος, η έμορφος).
- The declension of masculine nouns from singular, nominative termination "-ον" to genitive "-ονος" (ο νέον → τη νέονος, ο πάππον → τη πάππονος, ο λύκον → τη λύκονος, ο Τούρκον → τη Τούρκονος etc.).
- The ancient accenting of nouns in vocative form: άδελφε, Νίκολα, Μάρια.

=== Conjugation of verbs ===
- The second aorist form in -ον (ανάμνον, μείνον, κόψον, πίσον, ράψον, σβήσον).
- The middle voice verb termination in -ούμαι (ανακατούμαι, σκοτούμαι, στεφανούμαι).
- The passive voice aorist termination in -θα (anc. -θην): εγαπέθα, εκοιμέθα, εστάθα etc.
- The imperative form of passive aorist in -θετε (anc -θητι): εγαπέθετε, εκοιμέθετε, εστάθετε.
- The sporadic use of infinitives (εποθανείναι, μαθείναι, κόψ'ναι, ράψ'ναι, χαρίσ'ναι, αγαπέθειν, κοιμεθείν).
- Pontic en ("is") from Koine idiomatic form enesti (standard Ancient Greek esti), compare the Biblical form eni ("there is"), Modern Greek ine (είναι)

=== Infinitive ===
One of the most striking features of the Romeyka dialects spoken in the Trabzon region is the preservation of the ancient Greek infinitive, which has disappeared from all other Modern Greek varieties. In Standard Modern Greek, finite subjunctive clauses are used instead (e.g. Standard Greek θέλω να πάω “I want that I go” → “I want to go”), but Romeyka retains an aorist-based infinitive formed with the suffix -ίν(ι) or -είν(ι) (e.g. φαγίνι “to eat,” πιείνι “to drink,” κόψινι “to cut”).

Unlike earlier stages of Greek, however, the infinitive in Romeyka is no longer freely distributed. Sitaridou’s research shows that it behaves as a negative polarity item: it is licensed only in specific environments that entail the non-occurrence of the event, such as:

- in the complement of a negated past-tense modal or volitional verb:

ούτσ’ επορέσα τρέξινι – “I couldn’t run”

- in clauses headed by πριν (“before”):

πριν δοσίνι τα παράν ο Αϊσέ – “before Aise gives the money”

- in certain counterfactual constructions, especially in the Sürmene variety:

είχε ειπίν-α – “if I had said”

Furthermore, some sub-varieties, particularly in Sürmene, preserve an inflected (personal) infinitive: person and number endings are attached directly to the infinitive form, producing paradigms such as ειπίν-α “(for) me to say,” ειπίν-ες “(for) you to say,” ειπίν-ε “(for) him/her to say,” etc. This phenomenon has parallels in some Romance languages, notably Portuguese and Galician, which also feature personal infinitives with overt subjects in temporal clauses (e.g. Portuguese antes de tu ires “before you go”).

=== Lexicology ===
- The sporadic use of ας in the place of να: δός με ας τρόω.
- Pontic τεμέτερον (temeteron; "ours") from Ancient Greek τῶν ἡμετέρων (ton hemeteron) in contrast to Modern Greek των […] μας (ton […] mas.)

=== Comparison with Ancient Greek ===
1. Attachment of the /e/ sound to the ancient infinitive suffix –εῖν, -ειν (in Trapezountiac Pontic)

Pontic	Ancient
ειπείνε	εἰπεῖν
παθείνε	παθεῖν
αποθανείνε	ἀποθανεῖν
πιείνε	πιεῖν
ειδείνε	εἰδεῖν
φυείνε	φυγεῖν
ευρείνε	εὑρεῖν
καμείνε	καμεῖν
φαείνε	φαγεῖν
μαθείνε	μαθεῖν
ερθέανε	ἐλθεῖν
μενείνε	μένειν

2. Preservation of the Ancient infinitive suffix -ῆναι

Pontic	Ancient
ανεβήναι	ἀναβῆναι
κατεβήναι	καταβῆναι
εμπήναι	ἐμβῆναι
εβγήναι	ἐκβῆναι
επιδεαβήναι	ἀποδιαβῆναι
κοιμεθήναι	κοιμηθῆναι
χτυπεθήναι	κτυπηθῆναι
ευρεθήναι	εὑρεθῆναι
βρασήναι	βραχῆναι
ραήναι	ῥαγῆναι

3. Ancient first aorist infinitive suffix -αι has been replaced by second aorist suffix -ειν

Pontic	Ancient
κράξειν	κράξαι
μεθύσειν	μεθύσαι

4. Attachment of the /e/ sound to the ancient aorist infinitive suffix –ειν
ράψεινε, κράξεινε, μεθύσεινε, καλέσεινε, λαλήσεινε, κτυπήσεινε, καθίσεινε

5. Same aorist suffix –κα (–κα was also the regular perfect suffix)

Pontic	Ancient
εδώκα	ἔδωκα
εντώκα	ἐνέδωκα
εποίκα	ἐποίηκα
εφήκα	ἀφῆκα
εθήκα	ἔθηκα

6. Ancient Greek –ein (-εῖν) infinitive > Pontic Greek –eane (-έανε) infinitive

Pontic	Ancient
ερθέανε	ἐλθεῖν

== See also ==
- Mariupolitan Greek
- Caucasus Greeks
- Cappadocian Greek
- Italiot Greek
- Tsalka language

== Bibliography ==
- Berikashvili, Svetlana. 2017. Morphological aspects of Pontic Greek spoken in Georgia. LINCOM GmbH. ISBN 978-3862888528
- Özhan Öztürk, Karadeniz: Ansiklopedik Sözlük. 2 Cilt. Heyamola Yayıncılık. İstanbul, 2005. ISBN 975-6121-00-9
- Τομπαΐδης, Δ.Ε. 1988. Η Ποντιακή Διάλεκτος. Αθήνα: Αρχείον Πόντου. (Tompaidis, D.E. 1988. The Pontic Dialect. Athens: Archeion Pontou.)
- Τομπαΐδης, Δ.Ε. ϗ Συμεωνίδης, Χ.Π. 2002. Συμπλήρωμα στο Ιστορικόν Λεξικόν της Ποντικής Διαλέκτου του Α.Α. Παπαδόπουλου. Αθήνα: Αρχείον Πόντου. (Tompaidis, D.E. and Simeonidis, C.P. 2002. Additions to the Historical Lexicon of the Pontic Dialect of A.A. Papadopoulos. Athens: Archeion Pontou.)
- Παπαδόπουλος, Α.Α. 1955. Ιστορική Γραμματική της Ποντικής Διαλέκτου. Αθήνα: Επιτροπή Ποντιακών Μελετών. (Papadopoulos, A.A. 1955. Historical Grammar of the Pontic Dialect. Athens: Committee for Pontian Studies.)
- Παπαδόπουλος, Α.Α. 1958–61. Ιστορικόν Λεξικόν της Ποντικής Διαλέκτου. 2 τόμ. Αθήνα: Μυρτίδης. (Papadopoulos, A.A. 1958–61. Historical Lexicon of the Pontic Dialect. 2 volumes. Athens: Mirtidis.)
- Οικονομίδης, Δ.Η. 1958. Γραμματική της Ελληνικής Διαλέκτου του Πόντου. Αθήνα: Ακαδημία Αθηνών. (Oikonomidis, D.I. 1958. Grammar of the Greek Dialect of Pontos. Athens: Athens Academy.)
- Τοπχαράς, Κονσταντίνος. 1998 [1932]. Η Γραμματική της Ποντιακής: Ι Γραματικι τι Ρομεικυ τι Ποντεικυ τι Γλοςας. Θεσσαλονίκη: Αφοί Κυριακίδη. (Topcharas, K. 1998 [1932]. The Grammar of Pontic. Thessaloniki: Afoi Kiriakidi.)
