= List of populated places in Trabzon Province =

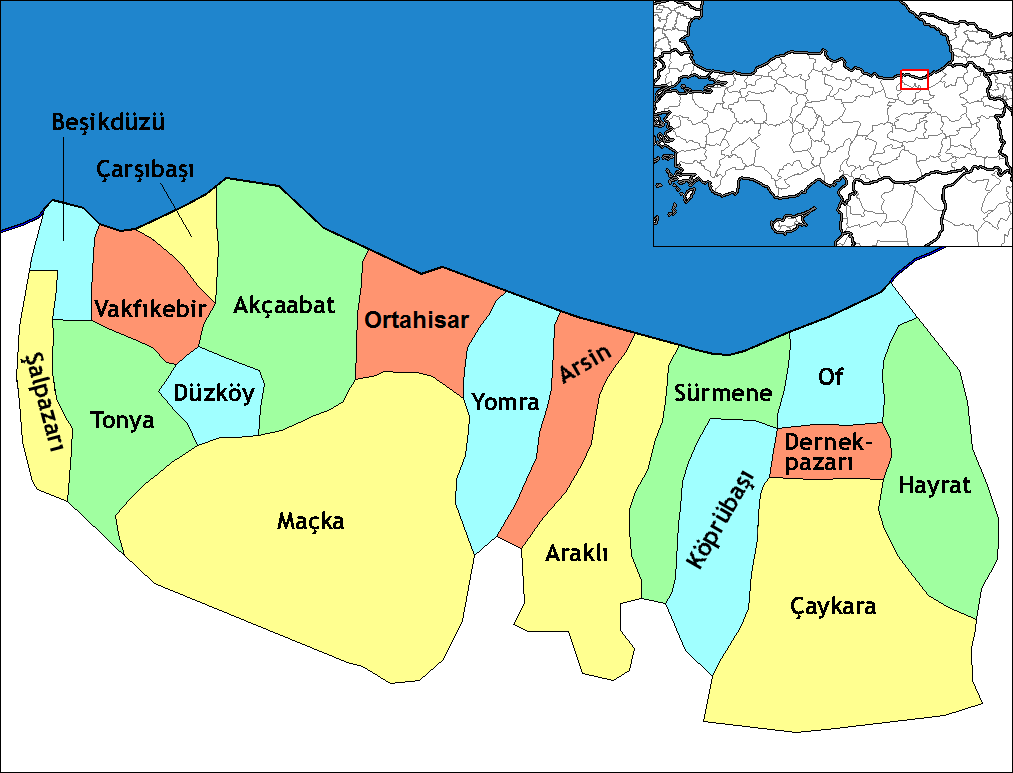
Trabzon Province

Below is the list of populated places in Trabzon Province, Turkey by the districts. In the following lists first place in each list is the administrative center of the district.

== Trabzon ==
- Trabzon
- Ağıllı, Trabzon
- Akkaya, Trabzon
- Akoluk, Trabzon
- Aktoprak, Trabzon
- Akyazı, Trabzon
- Ayvalı, Trabzon
- Beştaş, Trabzon
- Bulak, Trabzon
- Çağlayan, Trabzon
- Çamoba, Trabzon
- Çilekli, Trabzon
- Çimenli, Trabzon
- Çukurçayır, Trabzon
- Doğançay, Trabzon
- Dolaylı, Trabzon
- Düzyurt, Trabzon
- Esenyurt, Trabzon
- Fatih, Trabzon
- Geçit, Trabzon
- Gölçayır, Trabzon
- Gözalan, Trabzon
- Gündoğdu, Trabzon
- Gürbulak, Trabzon
- İncesu, Trabzon
- Karakaya, Trabzon
- Karlık, Trabzon
- Kavala, Trabzon
- Kireçhane, Trabzon
- Kozluca, Trabzon
- Kutlugün, Trabzon
- Pelitli, Trabzon
- Özbirlik, Trabzon
- Pınaraltı, Trabzon
- Sayvan, Trabzon
- Sevimli, Trabzon
- Subaşı, Trabzon
- Tosköy, Trabzon
- Yalıncak, Trabzon
- Yeniköy, Trabzon
- Yeşilbük, Trabzon
- Yeşiltepe, Trabzon
- Yeşilvadi, Trabzon
- Yeşilyurt, Trabzon

== Akçaabat ==
- Akçaabat
- Acısu, Akçaabat
- Adacık, Akçaabat
- Ağaçlı, Akçaabat
- Akçakale, Akçaabat
- Akdamar, Akçaabat
- Akçaköy, Akçaabat
- Akören, Akçaabat
- Akpınar, Akçaabat
- Alsancak, Akçaabat
- Ambarcık, Akçaabat
- Arpacılı, Akçaabat
- Aydınköy, Akçaabat
- Bozdoğan, Akçaabat
- Cevizli, Akçaabat
- Cevizlik, Akçaabat
- Çamlıca, Akçaabat
- Çamlıdere, Akçaabat
- Çınarlık, Akçaabat
- Çiçeklidüz, Akçaabat
- Çilekli, Akçaabat
- Çukurca, Akçaabat
- Darıca, Akçaabat
- Demirci, Akçaabat
- Demirkapı, Akçaabat
- Demirtaş, Akçaabat
- Derecik, Akçaabat
- Doğanköy, Akçaabat
- Dörtyol, Akçaabat
- Esentepe, Akçaabat
- Eskiköy, Akçaabat
- Fındıklı, Akçaabat
- Fıstıklı, Akçaabat
- Gümüşlü, Akçaabat
- Helvacı, Akçaabat
- Işıklar, Akçaabat
- Kaleönü, Akçaabat
- Karaçayır, Akçaabat
- Karpınar, Akçaabat
- Kavaklı, Akçaabat
- Kemaliye, Akçaabat
- Kirazlık, Akçaabat
- Koçlu, Akçaabat
- Kuruçam, Akçaabat
- Maden, Akçaabat
- Mersin, Akçaabat
- Meşeli, Akçaabat
- Meydankaya, Akçaabat
- Ortaalan, Akçaabat
- Ortaköy, Akçaabat
- Özakdamar, Akçaabat
- Özdemirci, Akçaabat
- Salacık, Akçaabat
- Sarıca, Akçaabat
- Sertkaya, Akçaabat
- Söğütlü, Akçaabat
- Şinik, Akçaabat
- Tatlısu, Akçaabat
- Tütüncüler, Akçaabat
- Uçarsu, Akçaabat
- Yeniköy, Akçaabat
- Yeşiltepe, Akçaabat
- Yeşilyurt, Akçaabat
- Yıldızlı, Akçaabat
- Zaferli, Akçaabat

== Araklı ==
- Araklı
- Aytaş, Araklı
- Ayvadere, Araklı
- Bahçecik, Araklı
- Bereketli, Araklı
- Birlik, Araklı
- Buzluca, Araklı
- Çamlıktepe, Araklı
- Çankaya, Araklı
- Çiftepınar, Araklı
- Çukurçayır, Araklı
- Değirmencik, Araklı
- Dulköy, Araklı
- Erenler, Araklı
- Erikli, Araklı
- Halilli, Araklı
- Hasköy, Araklı
- İyisu, Araklı
- Karatepe, Araklı
- Karşıyaka, Araklı
- Kayacık, Araklı
- Kayaiçi, Araklı
- Kaymaklı, Araklı
- Kestanelik, Araklı
- Köprüüstü, Araklı
- Kükürtlü, Araklı
- Merkezköy, Araklı
- Ortaköy, Araklı
- Pervane, Araklı
- Sulakyurt, Araklı
- Sularbaşı, Araklı
- Taşönü, Araklı
- Taşgeçit, Araklı
- Taştepe, Araklı
- Turnalı, Araklı
- Türkeli, Araklı
- Yalıboyu, Araklı
- Yassıkaya, Araklı
- Yeniköy, Araklı
- Yeşilce, Araklı
- Yeşilköy, Araklı
- Yeşilyurt, Araklı
- Yıldızlı, Araklı
- Yiğitözü, Araklı
- Yoncalı, Araklı
- Yüceyurt, Araklı

== Arsin ==
- Arsin
- Atayurt, Arsin
- Başdurak, Arsin
- Çardaklı, Arsin
- Çiçekli, Arsin
- Çubuklu, Arsin
- Dilek, Arsin
- Elmaalan, Arsin
- Fındıklı, Arsin
- Gölgelik, Arsin
- Güneyce, Arsin
- Harmanlı, Arsin
- Işıklı, Arsin
- İşhan, Arsin
- Karaca, Arsin
- Oğuz, Arsin
- Örnek, Arsin
- Özlü, Arsin
- Üçpınar, Arsin
- Yeniköy, Arsin
- Yeşilköy, Arsin
- Yeşilyalı, Arsin
- Yolaç, Arsin
- Yolüstü, Arsin

== Beşikdüzü ==
- Beşikdüzü
- Ağaçlı, Beşikdüzü
- Akkese, Beşikdüzü
- Aksaklı, Beşikdüzü
- Anbarlı, Beşikdüzü
- Ardıçatak, Beşikdüzü
- Bayırköy, Beşikdüzü
- Bozlu, Beşikdüzü
- Çakırlı, Beşikdüzü
- Çıtlaklı, Beşikdüzü
- Dağlıca, Beşikdüzü
- Denizli, Beşikdüzü
- Dolanlı, Beşikdüzü
- Duygulu, Beşikdüzü
- Gürgenli, Beşikdüzü
- Hünerli, Beşikdüzü
- Kalegüney, Beşikdüzü
- Korkuthan, Beşikdüzü
- Kutluca, Beşikdüzü
- Oğuz, Beşikdüzü
- Resullü, Beşikdüzü
- Sayvancık, Beşikdüzü
- Seyitahmet, Beşikdüzü
- Şahmelik, Beşikdüzü
- Takazlı, Beşikdüzü
- Yenicami, Beşikdüzü
- Yeşilköy, Beşikdüzü
- Zemberek, Beşikdüzü

== Çarşıbaşı ==
- Çarşıbaşı
- Çallı, Çarşıbaşı
- Erenköy, Çarşıbaşı
- Fenerköy, Çarşıbaşı
- Gülbahçe, Çarşıbaşı
- Kadıköy, Çarşıbaşı
- Kaleköy, Çarşıbaşı
- Kavaklı, Çarşıbaşı
- Kovanlı, Çarşıbaşı
- Küçükköy, Çarşıbaşı
- Pınarlı, Çarşıbaşı
- Samsun, Çarşıbaşı
- Serpilköy, Çarşıbaşı
- Şahinli, Çarşıbaşı
- Taşlıtepe, Çarşıbaşı
- Veliköy, Çarşıbaşı
- Yavuz, Çarşıbaşı
- Yeniköy, Çarşıbaşı

== Çaykara ==
- Çaykara
- Ataköy, Çaykara
- Akdoğan, Çaykara
- Arpaözü, Çaykara
- Aşağıkumlu, Çaykara
- Baltacılı, Çaykara
- Çambaşı, Çaykara
- Çamlıbel, Çaykara
- Çayıroba, Çaykara
- Demirkapı, Çaykara
- Demirli, Çaykara
- Derindere, Çaykara
- Eğridere, Çaykara
- Kabataş, Çaykara
- Karaçam, Çaykara
- Kayran, Çaykara
- Koldere, Çaykara
- Köknar, Çaykara
- Köseli, Çaykara
- Maraşlı, Çaykara
- Soğanlı, Çaykara
- Şahinkaya, Çaykara
- Şekersu, Çaykara
- Taşkıran, Çaykara
- Taşlıgedik, Çaykara
- Taşören, Çaykara
- Ulucami, Çaykara
- Uzungöl, Çaykara
- Uzuntarla, Çaykara
- Yeşilalan, Çaykara
- Yukarıkumlu, Çaykara
- Yaylaönü, Çaykara

== Dernekpazarı ==
- Dernekpazarı
- Akköse, Dernekpazarı
- Çalışanlar, Dernekpazarı
- Çayırbaşı, Dernekpazarı
- Gülen, Dernekpazarı
- Günebakan, Dernekpazarı
- Ormancık, Dernekpazarı
- Taşçılar, Dernekpazarı
- Tüfekçi, Dernekpazarı
- Yenice, Dernekpazarı
- Zincirlitaş, Dernekpazarı

== Düzköy ==
- Düzköy
- Alazlı, Düzköy
- Aykut, Düzköy
- Çalköy, Düzköy
- Çayırbağı, Düzköy
- Çiğdemli, Düzköy
- Gökçeler, Düzköy
- Gürgendağ, Düzköy
- Küçüktepeköy, Düzköy
- Taşocağı, Düzköy

== Hayrat ==
- Hayrat
- Balaban, Hayrat
- Dağönü, Hayrat
- Dereyurt, Hayrat
- Fatih, Hayrat
- Geçitli, Hayrat
- Göksel, Hayrat
- Kılavuz, Hayrat
- Köyceğiz, Hayrat
- Onur, Hayrat
- Pazarönü, Hayrat
- Pınarca, Hayrat
- Sarmaşık, Hayrat
- Şehitli, Hayrat
- Şişli, Hayrat
- Taflancık, Hayrat
- Yarlı, Hayrat
- Yeniköy, Hayrat
- Yıldırımlar, Hayrat
- Yırca, Hayrat

== Köprübaşı ==
- Köprübaşı
- Arpalı, Köprübaşı
- Beşköy, Köprübaşı
- Çifteköprü, Köprübaşı
- Güneşli, Köprübaşı
- Yağmurlu, Köprübaşı

== Maçka ==
- Maçka
- Akarsu, Maçka
- Akmescit, Maçka
- Alaçam, Maçka
- Alataş, Maçka
- Altındere, Maçka
- Anayurt, Maçka
- Ardıçlıyayla, Maçka
- Armağan, Maçka
- Atasu, Maçka
- Bağışlı, Maçka
- Bakımlı, Maçka
- Bakırcılar, Maçka
- Barışlı, Maçka
- Başar, Maçka
- Coşandere, Maçka
- Çamlıdüz, Maçka
- Çatak, Maçka
- Çayırlar, Maçka
- Çeşmeler, Maçka
- Çıralı, Maçka
- Dikkaya, Maçka
- Erginköy, Maçka
- Esiroğlu, Maçka
- Gayretli, Maçka
- Günay, Maçka
- Gürgenağaç, Maçka
- Güzelce, Maçka
- Güzelyayla, Maçka
- Hamsiköy, Maçka
- Hızarlı, Maçka
- Kapuköy, Maçka
- Kaynarca, Maçka
- Kırantaş, Maçka
- Kiremitli, Maçka
- Kozağaç, Maçka
- Köprüyanı, Maçka
- Kuşçu, Maçka
- Mataracı, Maçka
- Ocaklı, Maçka
- Oğulağaç, Maçka
- Ormaniçi, Maçka
- Ormanüstü, Maçka
- Ortaköy, Maçka
- Örnekalan, Maçka
- Sevinç, Maçka
- Sındıran, Maçka
- Sukenarı, Maçka
- Şimşirli, Maçka
- Temelli, Maçka
- Üçgedik, Maçka
- Yaylabaşı, Maçka
- Yazılıtaş, Maçka
- Yazlık, Maçka
- Yeniköy, Maçka
- Yerlice, Maçka
- Yeşilyurt, Maçka
- Yukarıköy, Maçka
- Yüzüncüyıl, Maçka
- Zaferli, Maçka

== Of ==
- Of
- Ağaçbaşı, Of
- Ağaçseven, Of
- Aşağıkışlacık, Of
- Ballıca, Of
- Barış, Of
- Başköy, Of
- Bayırca, Of
- Birlik, Of
- Bölümlü, Of
- Cumapazarı, Of
- Çaltılı, Of
- Çataldere, Of
- Çatalsöğüt, Of
- Çukurova, Of
- Dağalan, Of
- Darılı, Of
- Dereköy, Of
- Doğançay, Of
- Dumlusu, Of
- Erenköy, Of
- Esenköy, Of
- Eskipazar, Of
- Fındıkoba, Of
- Gökçeoba, Of
- Gümüşören, Of
- Güresen, Of
- Gürpınar, Of
- İkidere, Of
- Karabudak, Of
- Kavakpınar, Of
- Kazançlı, Of
- Keler, Of
- Kıyıboyu, Of
- Kıyıcık, Of
- Kiraz, Of
- Kireçli, Of
- Korkut, Of
- Korucuk, Of
- Kumludere, Of
- Ovacık, Of
- Örtülü, Of
- Pınaraltı, Of
- Saraçlı, Of
- Sarayköy, Of
- Sarıbey, Of
- Sarıkaya, Of
- Sefaköy, Of
- Serince, Of
- Sıraağaç, Of
- Sivrice, Of
- Söğütlü, Of
- Sugeldi, Of
- Tavşanlı, Of
- Tekoba, Of
- Uğurlu, Of
- Uluağaç, Of
- Yanıktaş, Of
- Yazlık, Of
- Yemişalan, Of

== Sürmene ==
- Sürmene
- Çamburnu, Sürmene
- Ormanseven, Sürmene
- Oylum, Sürmene
- Yeniay, Sürmene
- Aksu, Sürmene
- Armutlu, Sürmene
- Aşağıovalı, Sürmene
- Birlik, Sürmene
- Çiftesu, Sürmene
- Çimenli, Sürmene
- Dirlik, Sürmene
- Fındıcak, Sürmene
- Gültepe, Sürmene
- Güneyköy, Sürmene
- Kahraman, Sürmene
- Karacakaya, Sürmene
- Konak, Sürmene
- Koyuncular, Sürmene
- Küçükdere, Sürmene
- Muratlı, Sürmene
- Ortaköy, Sürmene
- Petekli, Sürmene
- Üzümlü, Sürmene
- Yazıoba, Sürmene
- Yeşilköy, Sürmene
- Yokuşbaşı, Sürmene
- Yukarıçavuşlu, Sürmene
- Yukarıovalı, Sürmene

== Şalpazarı ==
- Şalpazarı
- Ağırtaş, Şalpazarı
- Akçiriş, Şalpazarı
- Çamlıca, Şalpazarı
- Çarlaklı, Şalpazarı
- Çetrik, Şalpazarı
- Doğancı, Şalpazarı
- Dorukkiriş, Şalpazarı
- Düzköy, Şalpazarı
- Fidanbaşı, Şalpazarı
- Geyikli, Şalpazarı
- Gökçeköy, Şalpazarı
- Gölkiriş, Şalpazarı
- Güdün, Şalpazarı
- Kabasakal, Şalpazarı
- Karakaya, Şalpazarı
- Kasımağzı, Şalpazarı
- Kuzuluk, Şalpazarı
- Pelitçik, Şalpazarı
- Sayvançatak, Şalpazarı
- Simenli, Şalpazarı
- Sinlice, Şalpazarı
- Sütpınar, Şalpazarı
- Tepeağzı, Şalpazarı
- Üzümözü, Şalpazarı

== Tonya ==
- Tonya
- Biçinlik, Tonya
- Çamlı, Tonya
- Çayıriçi, Tonya
- Hoşarlı, Tonya
- İskenderli, Tonya
- Kalemli, Tonya
- Kalınçam, Tonya
- Karaağaçlı, Tonya
- Karasu, Tonya
- Kayacan, Tonya
- Kozluca, Tonya
- Kösecik, Tonya
- Melikşah, Tonya
- Sağrı, Tonya
- Sayraç, Tonya
- Yakçukur, Tonya

== Vakfıkebir ==
- Vakfıkebir
- Açıkalan, Vakfıkebir
- Akköy, Vakfıkebir
- Aydoğdu, Vakfıkebir
- Bahadırlı, Vakfıkebir
- Ballı, Vakfıkebir
- Bozalan, Vakfıkebir
- Caferli, Vakfıkebir
- Çamlık, Vakfıkebir
- Çavuşlu, Vakfıkebir
- Deregözü, Vakfıkebir
- Düzlük, Vakfıkebir
- Esentepe, Vakfıkebir
- Fethiye, Vakfıkebir
- Fevziye, Vakfıkebir
- Güneyköy, Vakfıkebir
- Güneysu, Vakfıkebir
- Hamzalı, Vakfıkebir
- İlyaslı, Vakfıkebir
- İshaklı, Vakfıkebir
- Karatepe, Vakfıkebir
- Kıranköy, Vakfıkebir
- Kirazlık, Vakfıkebir
- Köprücek, Vakfıkebir
- Mahmutlu, Vakfıkebir
- Mısırlı, Vakfıkebir
- Ortaköy, Vakfıkebir
- Rıdvanlı, Vakfıkebir
- Sekmenli, Vakfıkebir
- Sinanlı, Vakfıkebir
- Soğuksu, Vakfıkebir
- Şenocak, Vakfıkebir
- Tarlacık, Vakfıkebir
- Yalıköy, Vakfıkebir
- Yaylacık, Vakfıkebir
- Yıldız, Vakfıkebir

== Yomra ==
- Yomra
- Yomra, Yomra
- Çamlıyurt, Yomra
- Çınarlı, Yomra
- Demirciler, Yomra
- Gülyurdu, Yomra
- İkisu, Yomra
- Kaşüstü, Yomra
- Kayabaşı, Yomra
- Kılıçlı, Yomra
- Kıratlı, Yomra
- Kömürcü, Yomra
- Maden, Yomra
- Ocak, Yomra
- Oymalıtepe, Yomra
- Özdil, Yomra
- Pınarlı, Yomra
- Şanlı, Yomra
- Tandırlı, Yomra
- Taşdelen, Yomra
- Yenice, Yomra
- Yokuşlu, Yomra

== Recent development ==
According to Law act no 6360, all Turkish provinces with a population more than 750 000, were renamed as metropolitan municipality. Furthermore, the central district was renamed as Ortahisar. All districts in those provinces became second level municipalities and all villages in those districts were renamed as a neighborhoods . Thus the villages listed above are officially neighborhoods of Trabzon.
