= List of municipalities in Trabzon Province =

This is the List of municipalities in Trabzon Province, Turkey as of October 2007.

== Municipalities ==
List is sorted alphabetically A-Z, as Districts->Municipalities.

District	Municipality
Akçaabat	Adacık
Akçaabat	Akçaabat
Akçaabat	Akçakale
Akçaabat	Akçaköy
Akçaabat	Akpınar
Akçaabat	Darıca
Akçaabat	Derecik
Akçaabat	Doğanköy
Akçaabat	Dörtyol
Akçaabat	Işıklar
Akçaabat	Kavaklı
Akçaabat	Mersin
Akçaabat	Şinik
Akçaabat	Söğütlü
Akçaabat	Yıldızlı
Araklı	Araklı
Araklı	Çankaya
Araklı	Erenler
Araklı	Yeşilyurt
Arsin	Arsin
Arsin	Atayurt
Arsin	Fındıklı
Arsin	Yeşilyalı
Beşikdüzü	Beşikdüzü
Beşikdüzü	Türkelli
Beşikdüzü	Yeşilköy
Çarşıbaşı	Çarşıbaşı
Çaykara	Ataköy
Çaykara	Çaykara
Çaykara	Karaçam
Çaykara	Taşkıran
Çaykara	Uzungöl
Dernekpazarı	Dernekpazarı
Düzköy	Aykut
Düzköy	Çalköy
Düzköy	Çayırbağı
Düzköy	Düzköy
Hayrat	Balaban
Hayrat	Gülderen
Hayrat	Hayrat
Köprübaşı	Beşköy
Köprübaşı	Köprübaşı
Maçka	Atasu
Maçka	Esiroğlu
Maçka	Maçka
Of	Ballıca
Of	Bölümlü
Of	Cumapazarı
Of	Eskipazar
Of	Gürpınar
Of	Kıyıcık
Of	Of
Of	Uğurlu
Şalpazarı	Geyikli
Şalpazarı	Şalpazarı
Sürmene	Çamburnu
Sürmene	Ormanseven
Sürmene	Oylum
Sürmene	Sürmene
Sürmene	Yeniay
Tonya	İskenderli
Tonya	Tonya
Trabzon (Merkez)	Akoluk
Trabzon	Akyazı
Trabzon	Çağlayan
Trabzon	Çukurçayır
Trabzon	Gürbulak
Trabzon	Pelitli
Trabzon	Trabzon
Trabzon	Yalıncak
Trabzon	Yeşilova
Vakfıkebir	Vakfıkebir
Vakfıkebir	Yalıköy
Yomra	Kaşüstü
Yomra	Oymalıtepe
Yomra	Özdil
Yomra	Yomra

== Changes in 2014 ==
According to Law act no 6360, belde (town) municipalities within provinces with more than 750000 population (so called Metropolitan municipalities in Turkey) were abolished as of 30 March 2014. 57 belde municipalities in the above list are now defunct. The list is kept for historical reference.
