= Orhan Gülle =

Turkish footballer

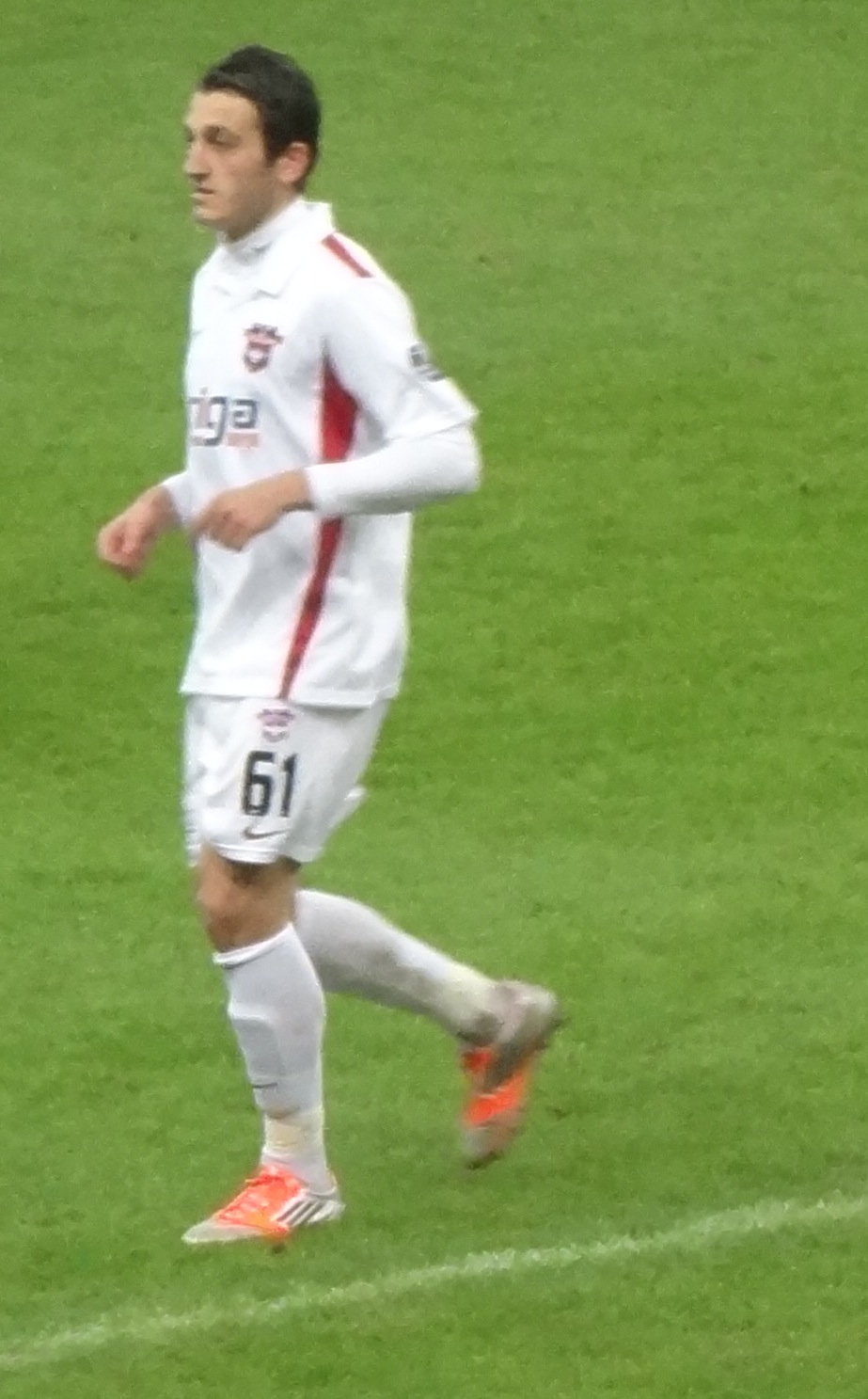

Personal information
- Date of birth: 15 January 1992 (age 34)
- Place of birth: Düzköy, Turkey
- Height: 1.87 m (6 ft 2 in)
- Position: Midfielder

Youth career
- 2003–2006: Esenler
- 2006–2010: Beşiktaş

Senior career*
Years	Team	Apps	(Gls)
2010–2014	Gaziantepspor	62	(2)
2015	Kayseri Erciyesspor	3	(1)
2015–2016	Sivasspor	4	(0)
2016	→ Boluspor (loan)	6	(0)
2016–2017	Ankaragücü	20	(0)
2017	Fethiyespor	4	(0)
2018	Silivrispor	9	(0)
2018–2019	Ankara Demirspor	16	(2)
2019	Erokspor	11	(0)
2020–2021	Yomraspor	21	(1)
2021–2022	Modafen	6	(1)
2022	Yomraspor	11	(0)
2023	Bergama Belediyespor	0	(0)

International career
2007	Turkey U15	1	(0)
2007–2008	Turkey U16	23	(8)
2008–2009	Turkey U17	18	(1)
2009–2010	Turkey U18	10	(2)
2010	Turkey U19	10	(1)
2010	Turkey U20	2	(0)
2009–2013	Turkey U21	14	(1)
- * Club domestic league appearances and goals as of 13 November 2022

Orhan Gülle (born 15 January 1992) is a Turkish professional footballer who plays as a midfielder. Gülle is also a youth international for Turkey, having been capped at various levels.

== Early life and club career ==
Gülle was born in Düzköy, a town in Trabzon Province to a tradesman and a housewife. Along with his parents and three siblings – two brothers and one sister – Gülle moved to Istanbul at the age of one. Coming from a football-eccentric family, Gülle started playing the sport at an early age. He signed up for a football school at the age of 11, and later signed with local club Esenler in 2002. Although Gülle went on to become a professional, he didn't take football very seriously as a youngster, saying "I didn't have any goals then... becoming a footballer was a dream for me". Beşiktaş scouts spotted the talented midfielder at an Istanbul amateur football tournament, and signed him on 18 September 2006. Gülle spent four years with the Black Eagles, amassing 47 appearances and five goals in the A2 (under 20) league. He was called up to train with the senior squad during the 2009–10 season, but did not make his professional debut with the club.

=== Gaziantepspor (2010–2014) ===
Gaziantepspor confirmed on 2 July 2010 that they had transferred the young midfielder, signing him to a four-year contract. He made his professional debut on 14 August 2010 against Kasımpaşa, entering the fray in the 70th minute. Gülle also made an appearance in the second match of the season, coming in with a half-hour left in the match.

== International career ==
Gülle has been capped at U-15, U-16, U-17, U-18, U-19, U-20, and U-21 levels for Turkey. He represented his country at the 2009 UEFA European Under-17 Championship, 2009 FIFA U-17 World Cup and 2011 UEFA European Under-19 Championship. He was an unused sub in Turkey's 17 November 2010 match against the Netherlands.
