= Meryem Küçükbirinci =

Turkish footballer (born 2004)

Personal information
- Date of birth: 3 March 2004 (age 22)
- Place of birth: Tonya, Trabzon Province, Turkey
- Position: Midfielder

Team information
- Current team: Hakkari
- Number: 61

Senior career*
Years	Team	Apps	(Gls)
2021–2024	Trabzon	49	(3)
2024–	Hakkari	23	(1)

International career^{‡}
2025–	Turkey	1	(0)
- * Club domestic league appearances and goals as of 15 October 2025 ‡ National team caps and goals as of 28 October 2025

Meryem Küçükbirinci (born 3 March 2004) is a Turkish women's football midfielder who plays in the Super League for Hakkari, and Turkey national team.

== Personal life and early years ==
Meryem Küçükbirinci was born on 3 March 2004 into a family with nine children that lives on animal husbandry, and was raised at the high-altitude Kadıralak Plateau in Tonya district of Trabzon Province, northern Turkey.

As the club Vakfıkebir she was a member of did not have a women's side, she played with boys in the academy team.

== Club career ==
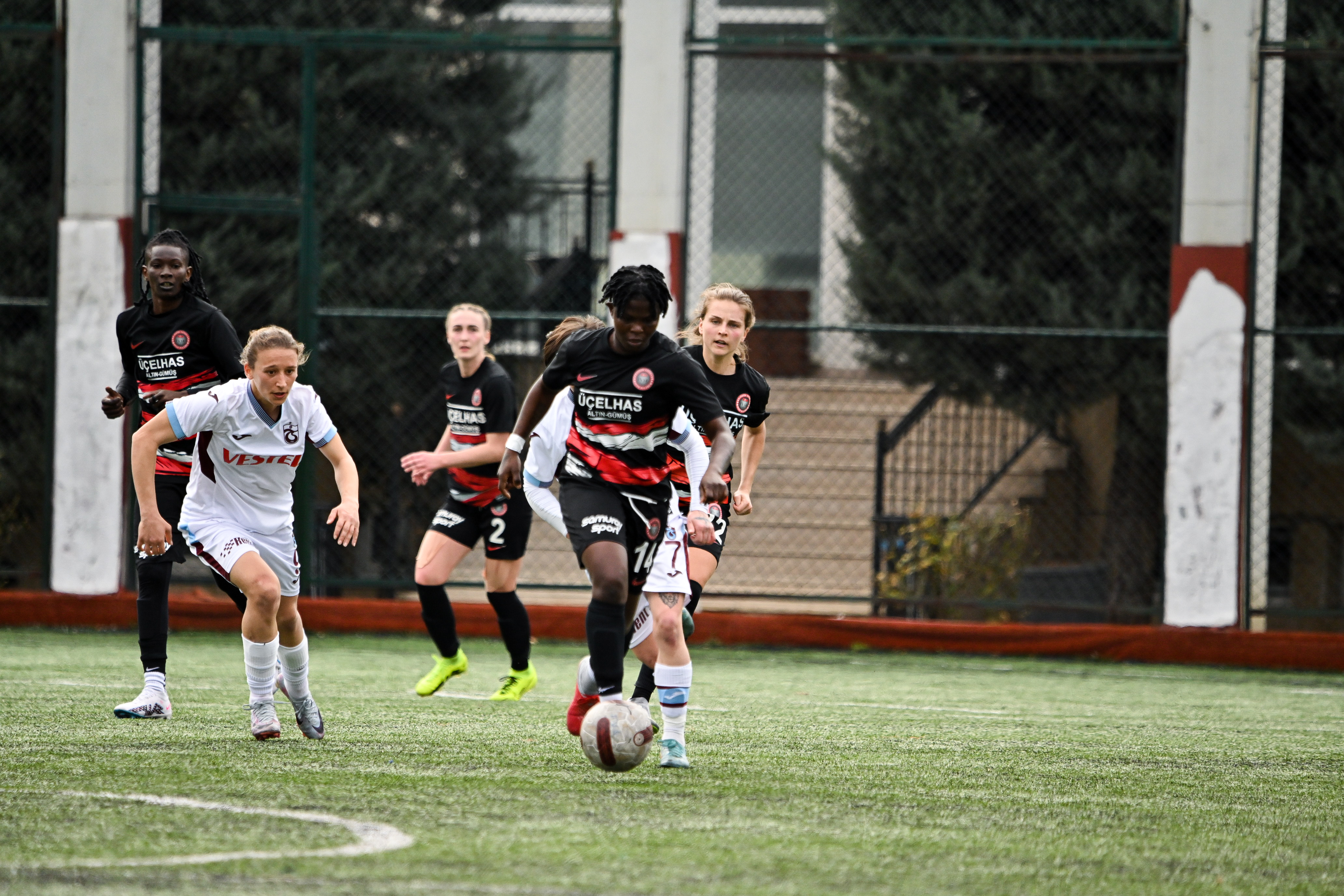
Küçükbirinci of Trabzon (left) in the 2023–24 Super League season's away match against Fatih Vatan.

Küçükbirinci obtained her license from her local club Trabzon on 12 April 2019. She started her club football career at the same club in the 2021–22 Super League season, and played three years .

In the beginning of the 2024–25 Super League season, she transferred to Hakkari.

== International career ==
Küçükbirinci was called up to the Turkey national team for the 2025 UEFA Women's Nations League B Group 2 maches, and joined the preparation camp. However, she was removed from the national team squad due to a meniscus tear on her left leg occurred during a 2024–25 Super League season match of her team Hakkari in early February 2025.

After her recovery, she rejoined the national tean and debuted in the 2025 UEFA Women's Nations League promotion/relegation match against Kosovo on 28 October 2025.

== Career statistics ==
As of match played 28 October 2025.

Club	Season	League			Continental		National		Total	
Club	Season	Division	Apps	Goals	Apps	Goals	Apps	Goals	Apps	Goals
Trabzon	2021–22	Super League	9	0	-	-	-	-	9	0
Trabzon	2022–23	Super League	13	3	-	-	-	-	13	3
Trabzon	2023–24	Super League	27	0	-	-	-	-	27	0
Trabzon	Total		49	3	-	-	-	-	49	3
Hakkari	2024–25	Super League	19	1	-	-	-	-	19	1
Hakkari	2025–24	Super League	4	0	-	-	1	0	5	0
Hakkari	Total		23	1	-	-	1	0	24	1
Grand total			72	4	-	-	1	0	73	4
