= İskender Pasha Mosque =

İskender Pasha Mosque is the name of a number of mosques. It may refer to:

- İskender Pasha Mosque, Fatih, in Fatih district of Istanbul, Turkey
- İskender Pasha Mosque, Kanlıca, in Kanlıca neighborhood of Beykoz district in Istanbul, Turkey
- İskender Pasha Mosque, Trabzon, in Trabzon, Turkey
