= Çukurköy =

Çukurköy can refer to:

- Çukurköy, Akseki
- Çukurköy, Hani
- Çukurköy, Havsa
- Çukurköy, İskilip
- Çukurköy, Yomra
- Şanlı, Yomra, formerly Çukurköy
