= Harmanlı, Arsin =

Harmanlı
- Neighbourhood
- Country: Turkey
- Province: Trabzon
- District: Arsin
- Population (2022): 546
- Time zone: UTC+3 (TRT)

Harmanlı is a neighbourhood of the municipality and district of Arsin, Trabzon Province, Turkey. Its population is 546 (2022). It is located 28 kilometers from Trabzon, 8 kilometers from Arsin, and 8-9 kilometers from Yomra.

The early name of Harmanlı was Varvara, referring to Saint Barbara. It was a partly Greek Orthodox village at the beginning of the 20th century.

== Economy ==
The economy is mostly based on agriculture. The main product is hazelnuts and the income level is insufficient to survive. It is because of this that many people have emigrated from the village for economic opportunities.
