= Düzyurt =

- Neighbourhood
- Location in Turkey
- Coordinates: 40°58′N 39°44′E
- Country: Turkey
- Province: Trabzon
- District: Ortahisar
- Population (2022): 1,782
- Time zone: UTC+3 (TRT)

Duzyurt is a neighbourhood of the municipality and district of Ortahisar, Trabzon Province, Turkey. Its population is 1,782 (2022).

== Sport ==
The Trabzon Düzyurtspor is the most important sports club of the town. The team currently plays in the TFF Second League.
