= Fatih Mosque, Trabzon =

Mosque in Trabzon, Turkey

Fatih Mosque
- Fatih Camii
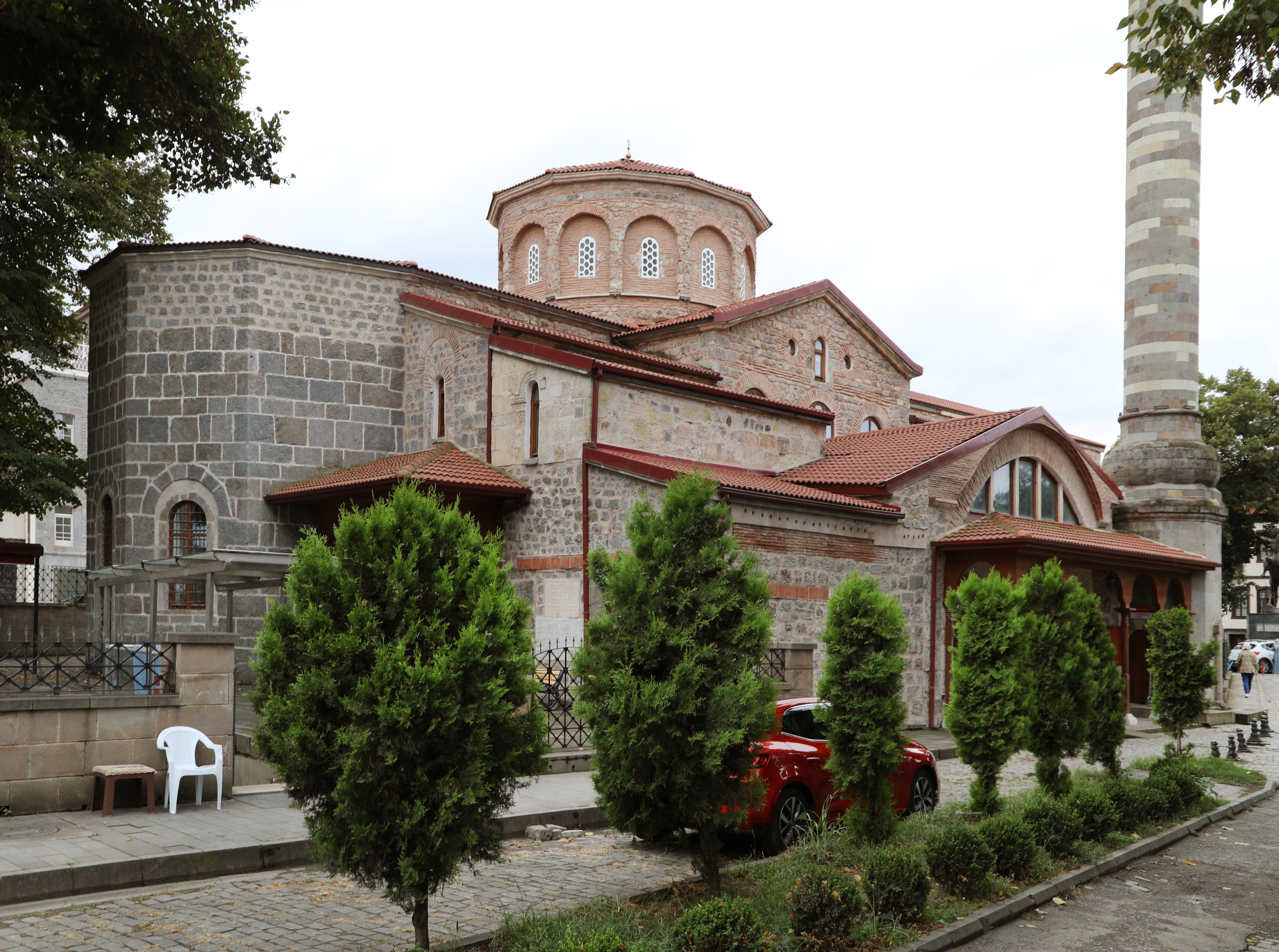

- Location within Turkey

Religion
- Affiliation: Greek Orthodox, Islam

Location
- Municipality: Ortahisar, Trabzon
- Country: Turkey
- Interactive map of Fatih Mosque
- Coordinates: 41°00′16″N 39°43′10″E

Architecture
- Type: mosque
- Style: Byzantine
- Established: 1461
- Minaret: 1

The Fatih Mosque (Turkish: Fatih Camii, "Conqueror's Mosque") is a mosque in Ortahisar district of Trabzon Province, Turkey. It was originally built in Byzantine times as the Panagia Chrysokephalos Church (Greek: Παναγία Χρυσοκέφαλος, "Panagia the Golden-Headed"), serving as both the catholicon for the see of Trebizond, and a church for a monastery. It was built sometime in the 10th or 11th century. After Ottoman conquest of the city in 1461, the building became a mosque. The Fatih Mosque also displays the most beautiful samples of the Ottoman writing arts.

== History ==
A number of churches are believed to have stood where the present structure now stands. During the heyday of the Empire of Trebziond, it was used as the resting-place for a number of dignitaries including Emperor John II Megas Komnenos in 1297, Metropolitan Niphon in 1364, and Emperor Alexios IV Megas Komnenos in 1429.

The church became a mosque after the Ottoman conquest and first prayer was attended by Mehmet II, who adjoined a madrasah (Fatih Madrasa) to the building.

Ballance also notes that it is "very difficult" to date any portion of the church. She mentions a report of a plaque bearing the date 914 found (since lost) under the floor of the present building during repairs in 1877; there is also a dedication hymn that was sung at its rebuilding after the Hamigogullari set fire to the town in 1341. However, she was unable to match any of its features to either period. "On stylistic grounds a date in the 10th or perhaps 11th century seems reasonable for the basilical layout, with the dome perhaps 12th century ... but it is difficult to see how this can be reconciled with the evidence of the rededication hymn of the mid-14th century." Ballance does note a number of minor details, such as lower windows and blocked doorways, date to the Turkish period.

== Architecture ==
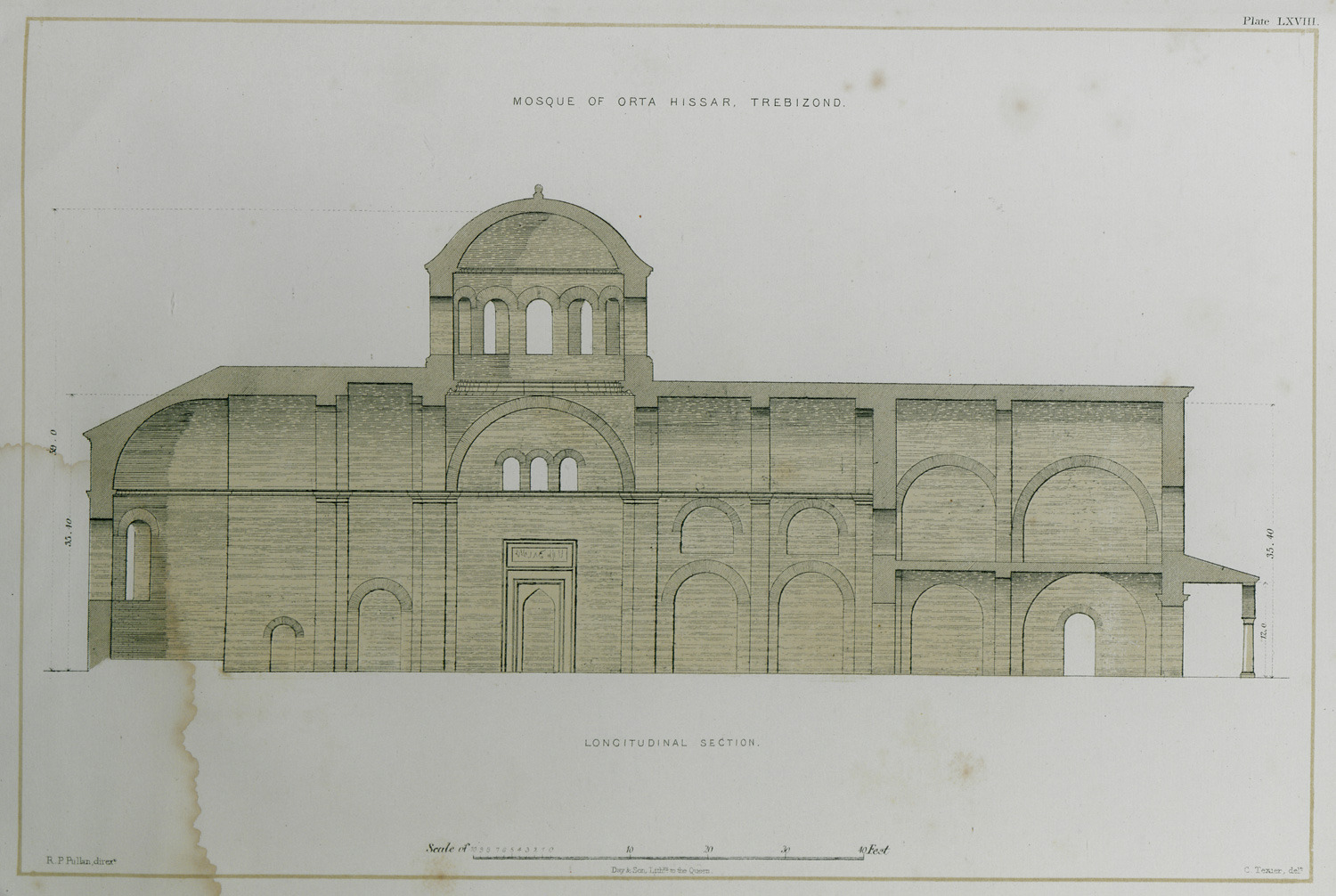
Félix Marie Charles Texier. Byzantine Architecture, illustrated by Examples of Edifices erected in the East during the earliest Ages of Christianity, R.Popplewell Pullan, London, Day & Son, 1864.

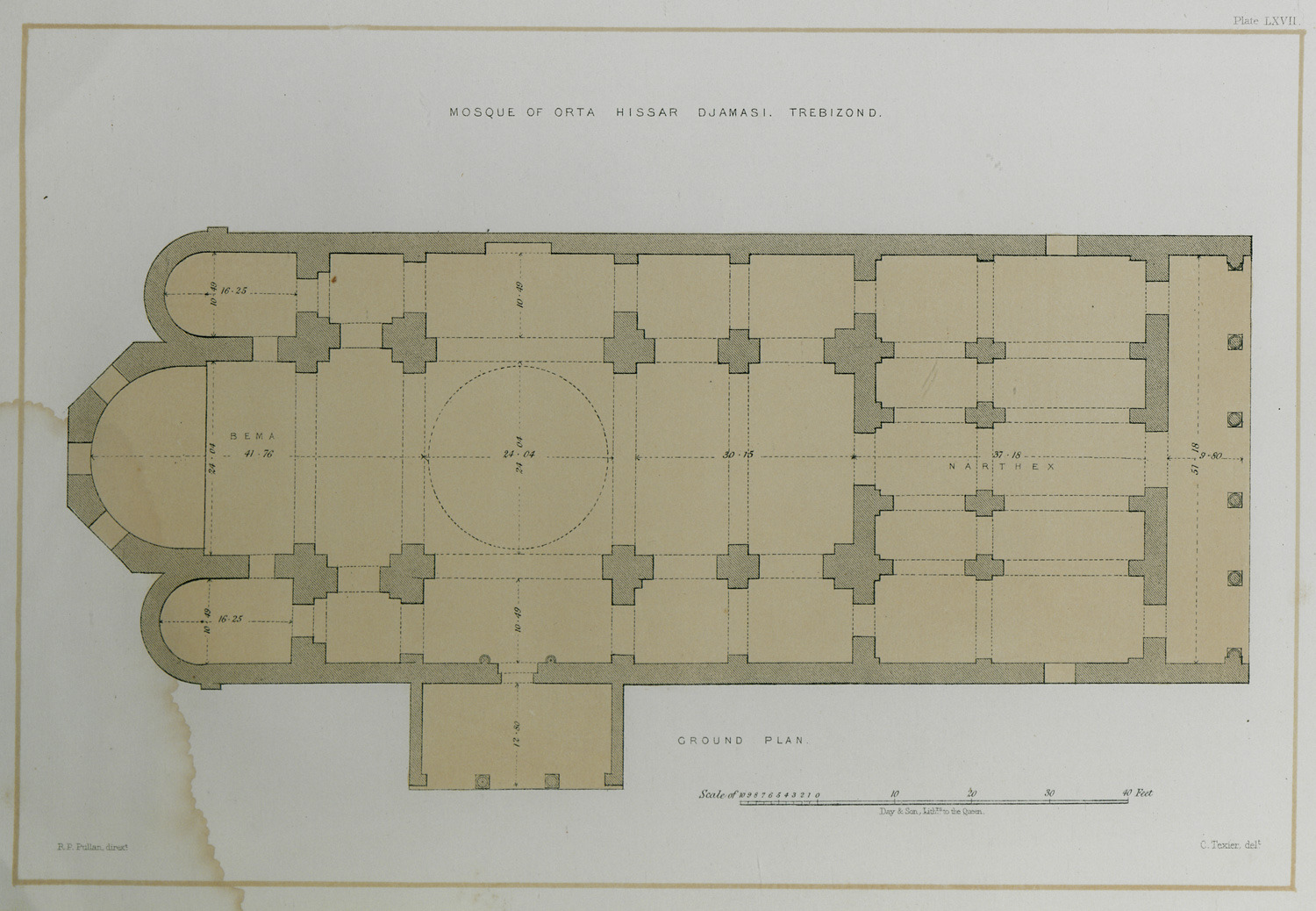
Felix Marie Charles Texier. Byzantine Architecture, illustrated by Examples of Edifices erected in the East during the earliest Ages of Christianity, R. Popplewell Pullan, London, Day & Son, 1864.

Selina Ballance, who studied the building in 1958, described it as follows: "Though strongly basilical in character, it has a dome, and transepts open from floor to vault running north and south to the outer walls; the aisles, like the nave, are barrel-vaulted, with ribs, but have galleries over them, even over the eastern bays which are cut off from the rest by the transepts: and the vaults of the aisle bays on the ground floor span at right-angles to those of the nave and the galleries." She noted it was unusual in many respects, specifically in that basilicas do not commonly have galleried aisles—as this one does—and by having a narthex outside of the main narthex.

== Gallery ==
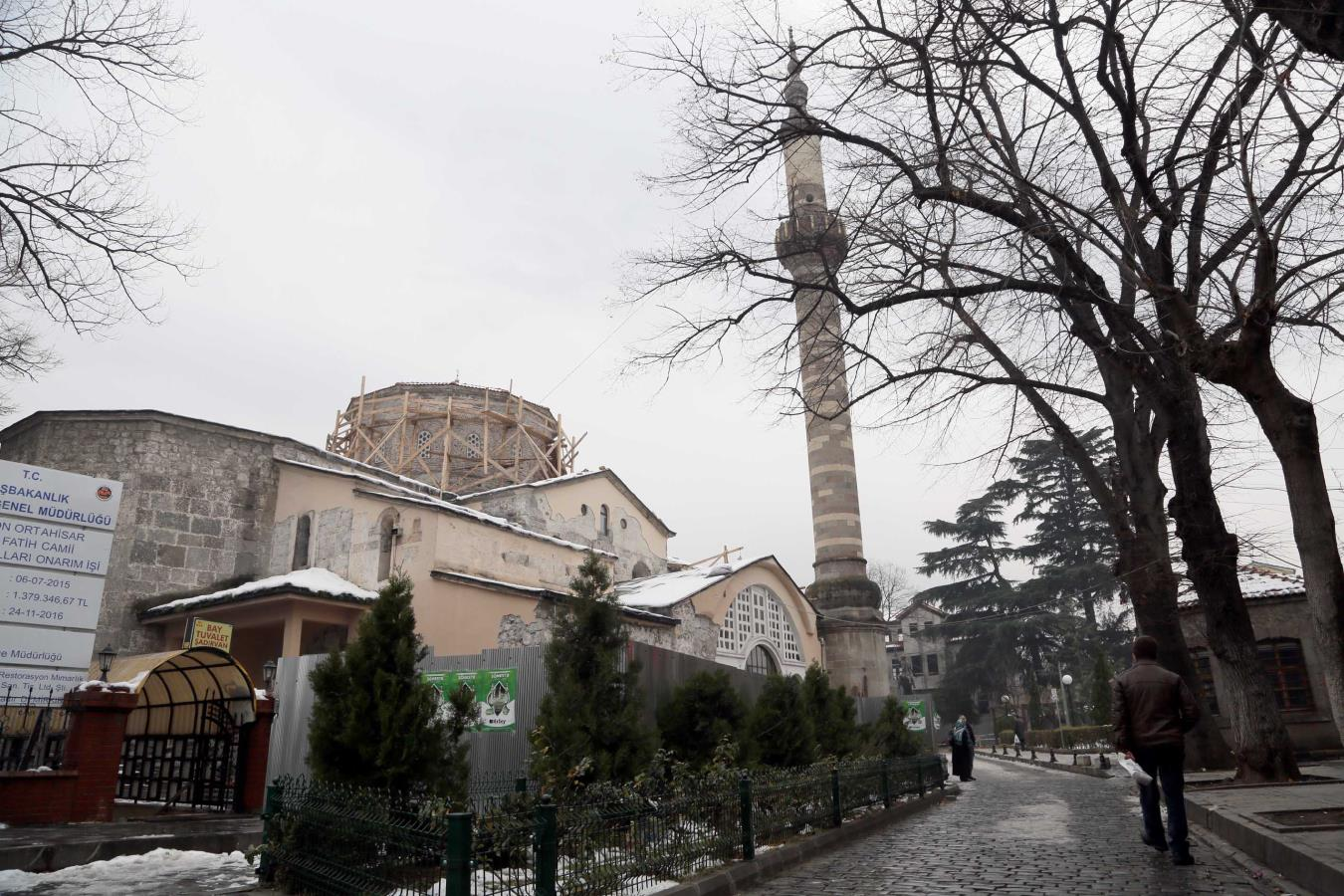
The Fatih Mosque during restoration works in 2016

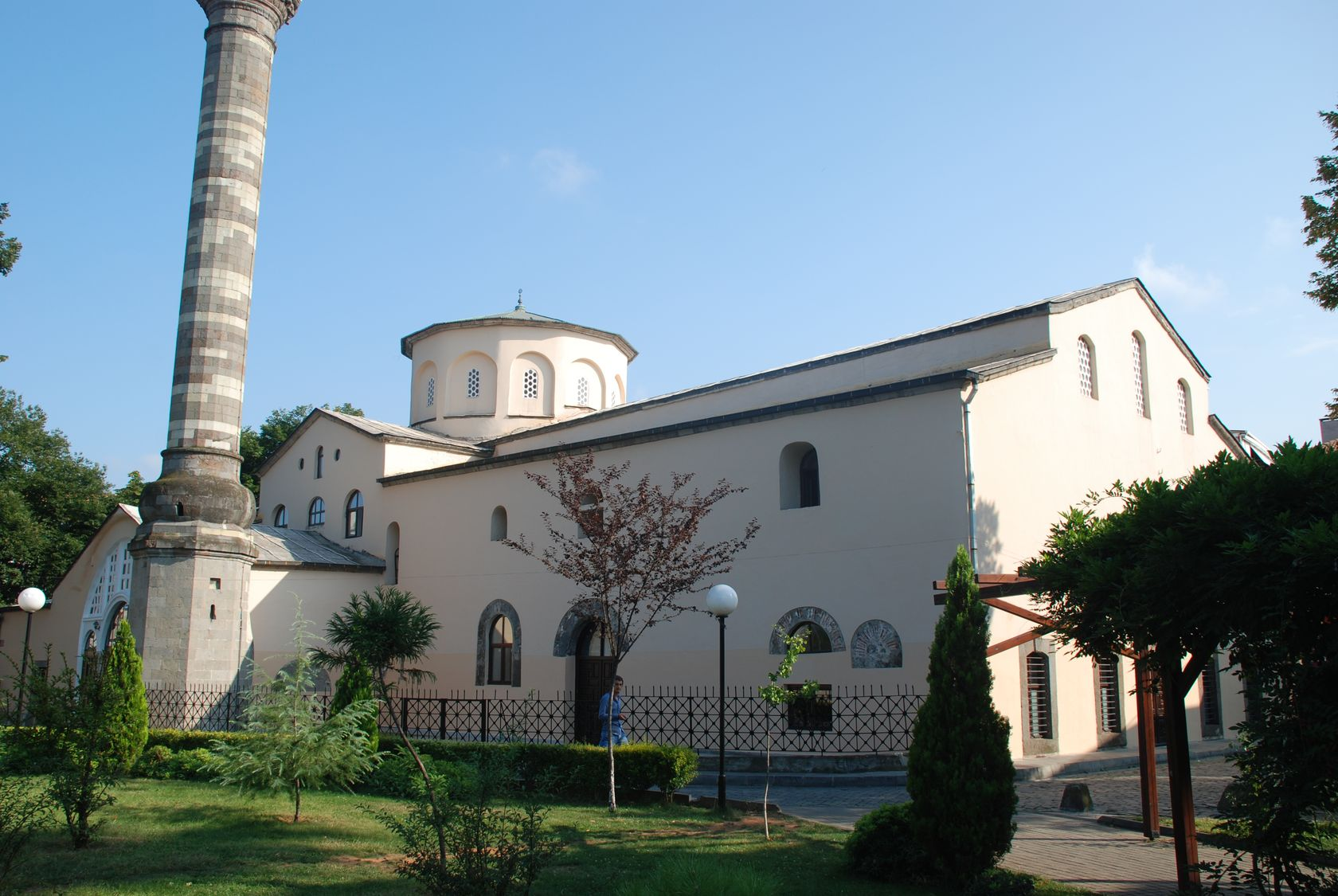
Mosque before restoration

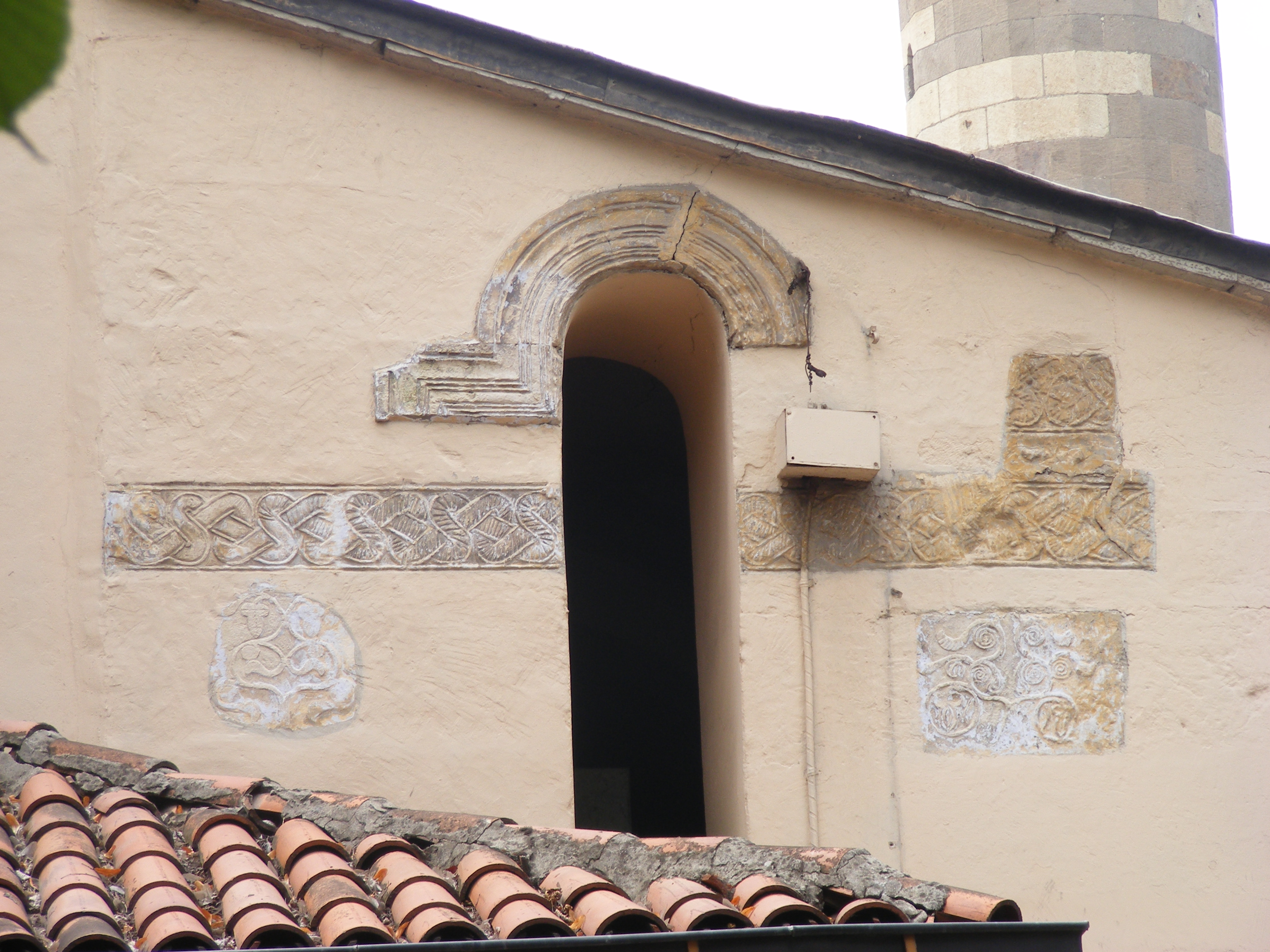
Window of the former Panagia Khrysokephalos church, now known as the Fatih mosque
