= Şahmelik, Beşikdüzü =

Şahmelik
- Neighbourhood
- Location in Turkey
- Coordinates: 41.012°N 39.183°E
- Country: Turkey
- Province: Trabzon
- District: Beşikdüzü
- Population (2022): 361
- Time zone: UTC+3 (TRT)

Şahmelik is a neighbourhood of the municipality and district of Beşikdüzü, Trabzon Province, Turkey. Its population is 361 (2022). It was named after Melikşah, an 11th century shah of the Seljuk Empire. Most of the population consists of Chepni people of the Turkmens. Şahmelik, which was the biggest village of Beşikdüzü years ago, has extensive surface.

== Culture ==
Turkmen Çepni's culture is going on from place to place. In Şahmelik, it is possible to find the regional meal of Blacksea which is rare for example; nettle soup also molasses can be made by every type of fruit. Education level is higher than the other districts and has pretty much trained human.

== Geography ==
The distance is 56 km from Trabzon to Şahmelik, 11 km from Beşikdüzü to Şahmelik. Neighbor villages are Ardıçatak, Çakırlı, Kutluca, Korkuthan, Kalegüney, Yenicami.

== Population ==
Historical population
Year	Pop.	±% p.a.
1997	471	—
2007	347	−3.01%
2012	324	−1.36%
2017	314	−0.63%
2022	361	+2.83%
Source: 1997 census and TÜIK (2007-2022)

== Economy ==
The district's economy is based on agriculture and livestock. Local community produces nut, tea and kiwi.
