= Köyceğiz, Hayrat =

Köyceğiz Kalanta (Greek)
- Neighbourhood
- Location in Turkey
- Coordinates: 40°54′25″N 40°21′29″E
- Country: Turkey
- Province: Trabzon
- District: Hayrat
- Population (2022): 204
- Time zone: UTC+3 (TRT)

Köyceğiz is a neighbourhood of the municipality and district of Hayrat, Trabzon Province, Turkey. Its population is 204 (2022). The village is located 3 kilometres (2 mi) north from Hayrat.
