= Pelitli =

- Neighbourhood
- Location in Turkey
- Coordinates: 40°59′N 39°48′E
- Country: Turkey
- Province: Trabzon
- District: Ortahisar
- Elevation: 100 m (330 ft)
- Population (2022): 23,314
- Time zone: UTC+3 (TRT)
- Postal code: 61080
- Area code: 0462

Pelitli (literally "with Acorn") is a neighbourhood of the municipality and district of Ortahisar, Trabzon Province, Turkey. Its population is 23,314 (2022). Before the 2013 reorganisation, it was a town (belde). It is an eastern coastal suburb of Trabzon, situated to the east of Trabzon Airport.

During the Ottoman era after 1461, Chepni people (a branch of Oghuz Turks) formed the original population of the settlement. When Russians occupied the region in 1916 during the First World War, Chepnis left the settlement; but towards the end of the war, after the Russians retreated they returned. During the republican years the population of the settlement was increased and in 1995 it was declared a seat of township. In 1997, a nearby village (Yeşilköy) was merged to Pelitli.
