= Kadıralak Nature Park =

Nature park in Turkey

- Kadıralak Tabiat Parkı
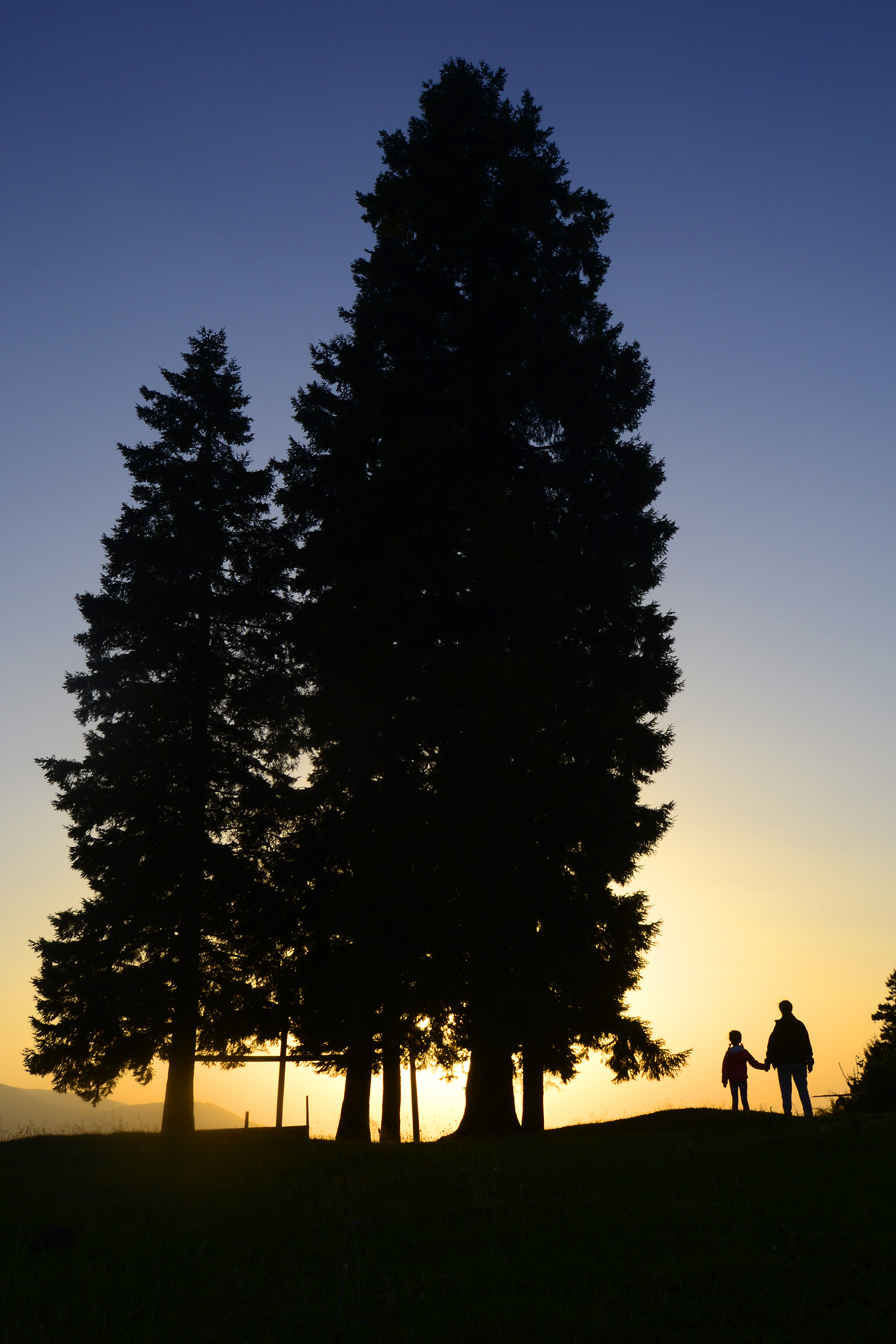

- Location within Turkey
- Coordinates: 40.894°N 39.308°E
- Established: 2017; 9 years ago
- Governing body: Directorate-General of Nature Protection and National Parks; Ministry of Environment and Forest
- Website: ekotaban.tarimorman.gov.tr/alan/1636

Kadıralak Nature Park (Turkish: Kadıralak Tabiat Parkı) is a nature park at Kadıralak in Tonya District, northern Turkey.
