= Şanlı, Yomra =

Village in Yomra, Trabzon Province, Turkey

Şanlı
- Neighbourhood
- Location in Turkey
- Coordinates: 40.89485°N 39.82664°E
- Country: Turkey
- Province: Trabzon
- District: Yomra
- Population (2022): 392
- Time zone: UTC+3 (TRT)

Şanlı (formerly: Çukurköy) is a neighbourhood of the municipality and district of Yomra, Trabzon Province, Turkey. Its population is 392 (2022). The old name of the village was Küçük Şana (Small Şana). Many years ago, the village economically depended on a small coastal town near the east of the Black Sea named Şana. This small town had two villages. The name of the first one was Küçük Şana while that of the second one was Büyük Şana (Great Şana); in the period of the Turkish Republic (i.e. after 1923), the first village's name became Çukurköy or Çukur Köyü.

The village economy depends on agriculture, its main product being hazelnuts. A small river, Küçük Şana Deresi (Small Şana River), passes through the village. Migration to urban areas has meant a sharp population decline and an aging population.

== The meaning of Şana ==
Two myths relate to the origins of the name of Şana. The first one is related to the 16th-century traveler Evliya Çelebi. It is said he pronounced "Şahane" when visiting the village. This word means "glorious", "tremendous", or "fantastic" in the Turkish language, the word itself being derived from the Persian language.

A more plausible myth is related to the regionally-spoken Laz language. According to this explanation, "şana" means "festival."
