= Çukurçayır =

- Neighbourhood
- Location in Turkey
- Coordinates: 40°59′12″N 39°43′47″E
- Country: Turkey
- Province: Trabzon
- District: Ortahisar
- Elevation: 275 m (902 ft)
- Population (2022): 33,438
- Time zone: UTC+3 (TRT)
- Postal code: 61030
- Area code: 0462

Çukurçayır is a neighbourhood of the municipality and district of Ortahisar, Trabzon Province, Turkey. Its population is 33,438 (2022). Before the 2013 reorganisation, it was a town (belde). Çukurçayır is a southern suburb of Trabzon, situated to the west of Turkish state highway D.885 which connects Trabzon to Gümüşhane, Maçka and Sumela Monastery. In 1995 it was declared a seat of township. According to mayor's page a monastery and a bridge are the historically important ruins of the town.
