= Ortahisar =

- District and municipality
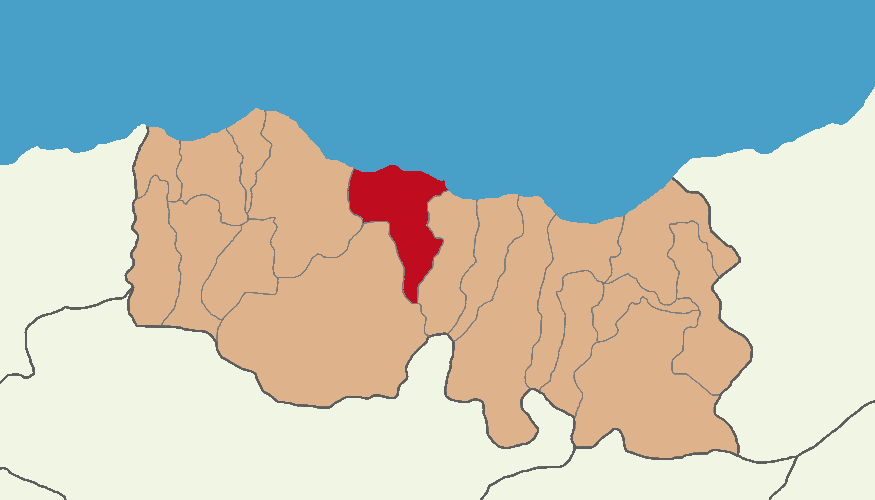
- Map showing Ortahisar District in Trabzon Province

- Location within Turkey
- Coordinates: 41°00′N 39°43′E
- Country: Turkey
- Province: Trabzon

Government
  - Mayor: Ahmet Kaya (CHP)
- Area: 235 km^{2} (91 sq mi)
- Elevation: 50 m (160 ft)
- Population (2022): 335,628
  - Density: 1,430/km^{2} (3,700/sq mi)
- Time zone: UTC+3 (TRT)
- Area code: 0462
- Website: www.trabzonortahisar.bel.tr

Ortahisar is a municipality and district of Trabzon Province, Turkey. Its area is 235 km^{2}, and its population is 335,628 (2022). The district and municipality Ortahisar was created at the 2013 Turkish local government reorganisation from the former central district of Trabzon Province. It covers the city of Trabzon and the surrounding countryside. On 31 March 2024, Ahmet Kaya (CHP) was elected mayor.

In April 2021, archaeologists announced the discovery of Roman and Byzantine period archeological remains. The southern part of the wicker columns and fortifications of the Roman emperor Hadrian's period, trench walls of Byzantine period dating back to 1460 have been discovered. Remains of Roman tiles and pottery were also discovered during the excavations. According to the Trabzon City Municipality, the excavation area is planned to be turned into an open-air museum.

== Sport ==
The women's handball team Ortahisar Bld. SK compete in the 2024–25 season of the Super League.

== Places of Interest ==
- Fatih Mosque, Trabzon

== Composition ==
There are 87 neighbourhoods in Ortahisar District:

- 1 Nolu Beşirli
- 1 Nolu Bostancı
- 1 Nolu Erdoğdu
- 2 Nolu Beşirli
- 2 Nolu Bostancı
- 2 Nolu Erdoğdu
- 3 Nolu Erdoğdu
- Ağıllı
- Akkaya
- Akoluk
- Aktoprak
- Akyazı
- Aydınlıkevler
- Ayvalı
- Bahçecik
- Bengisu
- Beştaş
- Boztepe
- Bulak
- Çağlayan
- Çamoba
- Çarşı
- Çilekli
- Çimenli
- Çömlekçi
- Çukurçayır
- Cumhuriyet
- Değirmendere
- Doğançay
- Dolaylı
- Düzyurt
- Esentepe
- Esenyurt
- Fatih
- Fatih Sultan
- Gazipaşa
- Geçit
- Gölçayır
- Gözalan
- Gülbaharhatun
- Gündoğdu
- Gürbulak
- Hızırbey
- İncesu
- İnönü
- İskenderpaşa
- Kalkınma
- Kamışlı
- Kanuni
- Karakaya
- Karlık
- Karşıyaka
- Kavala
- Kaymaklı
- Kemerkaya
- Kireçhane
- Konaklar
- Kozluca
- Kurtuluş
- Kutlugün
- Okçular
- Ortahisar
- Özbirlik
- Pazarkapı
- Pelitli
- Pınaraltı
- Sanayi
- Sayvan
- Sevimli
- Soğuksu
- Subaşı
- Toklu
- Tosköy
- Uğurlu
- Üniversite
- Yalı
- Yalıncak
- Yenicuma
- Yeniköy
- Yenimahalle
- Yeşilbük
- Yeşilhisar
- Yeşilköy
- Yeşilova
- Yeşiltepe
- Yeşilvadi
- Yeşilyurt
