= Yalıncak =

- Neighbourhood
- Location within Turkey
- Coordinates: 40°58′N 39°49′E
- Country: Turkey
- Province: Trabzon
- District: Ortahisar
- Elevation: 160 m (520 ft)
- Population (2022): 7,985
- Time zone: UTC+3 (TRT)
- Postal code: 61080
- Area code: 0462
- Climate: Cfa

Yalıncak is a neighbourhood of the municipality and district of Ortahisar, Trabzon Province, Turkey. Its population is 7,985 (2022). Before the 2013 reorganisation, it was a town (belde). It is situated to the east of Trabzon. The distance to Trabzon city center is 11 kilometres (6.8 mi). In 1995 it was declared a seat of township. Main agricultural products are watermelon, tomato and nut. Some Yalıncak residents work in nearby Trabzon.
