= Çağlayan, Trabzon =

Çağlayan
- Neighbourhood
- Location in Turkey
- Coordinates: 40°54′N 39°43′E
- Country: Turkey
- Province: Trabzon
- District: Ortahisar
- Elevation: 120 m (390 ft)
- Population (2022): 2,716
- Time zone: UTC+3 (TRT)
- Postal code: 61030
- Area code: 0462

Çağlayan (literally "Waterfall") is a neighbourhood of the municipality and district of Ortahisar, Trabzon Province, Turkey. Its population is 2,716 (2022). Before the 2013 reorganisation, it was a town (belde). It is situated along the valley of Altındere creek. It is on Turkish state highway D.885 which connects Trabzon to hinterland (and Sümela Monastery). The distance to Trabzon is 16 kilometres (9.9 mi).

The area around Çağlayan was inhabited during the ancient ages, but Çağlayan is a relatively recent settlement. In 1946 owing to its situation along the valley, it was founded as a common market place of the neighbouring villages. It quickly flourished and in 1969 it was declared a seat of township. The economy of the town depends on agriculture. Lately, kiwifruit production has been promoted.
