= İskender Pasha Mosque, Trabzon =

16th-century built Ottoman mosque in Trabzon, Turkey

Coordinates: 41.00593°N 39.72896°E

İskender Pasha Mosque

Religion
- Affiliation: Islam
- Interactive map of İskender Pasha Mosque

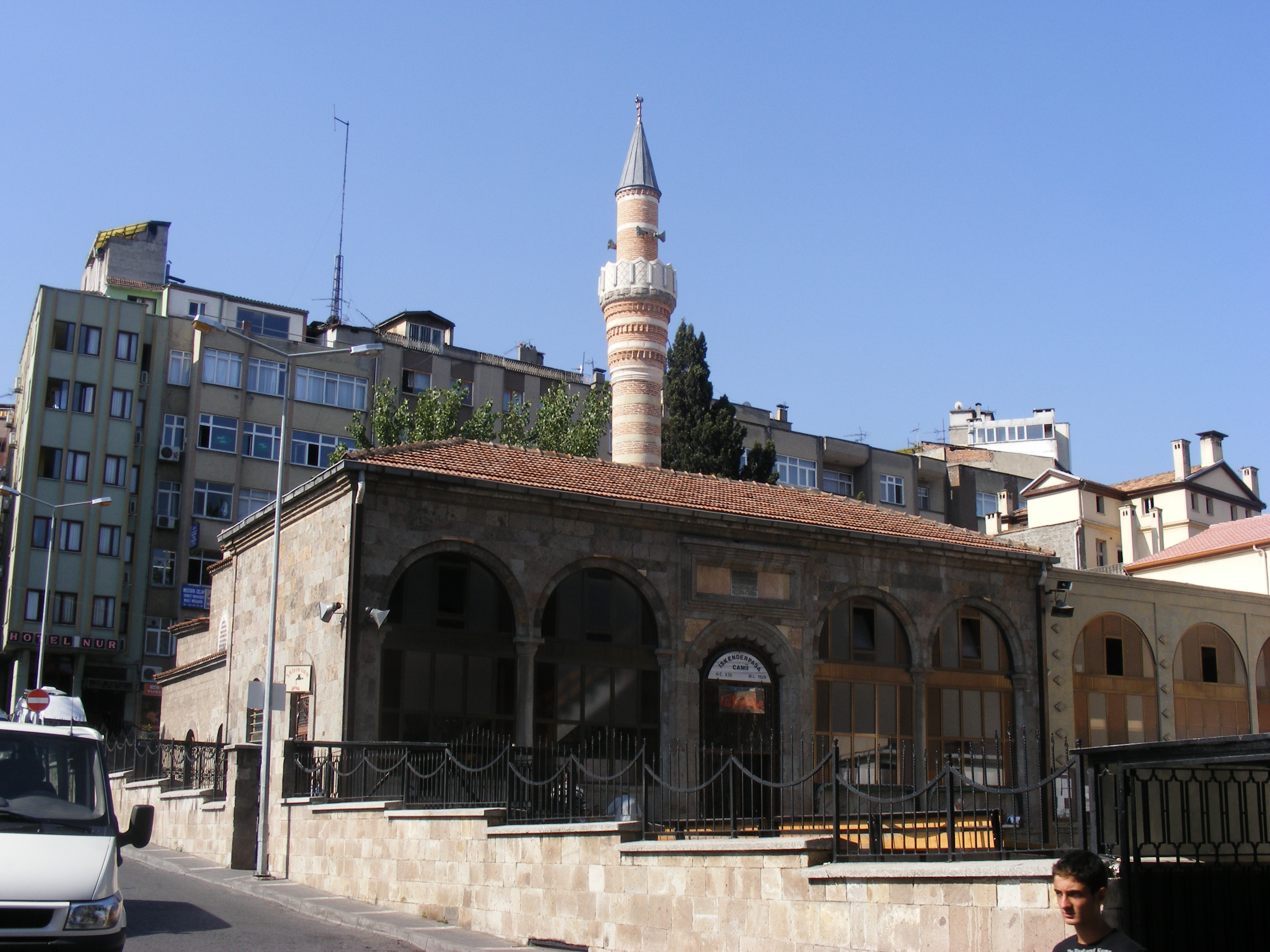
Iskender Pasha Mosque, Trabzon

İskender Pasha Mosque is a 16th-century built Ottoman mosque in Trabzon, Turkey.

The madrasas in its courtyard no longer exist, and the old graveyard in the west has been done away, leaving only the grave of Iskender Pasha. A number of extensions have been made at various times and this, combined with restorations, has destroyed the originality of the mosque, the stone work of which, however is of the highest quality. The minaret features alternating courses of brick and colored stone. The main plan of the mosque resembles that of the Green Mosque at Iznik. An inscription over the door states that the mosque was built in 1559, and another inscription inform us that restorations endowing the mosque with its present form were carried out in 1882.
