= Şalpazarı =

- District and municipality
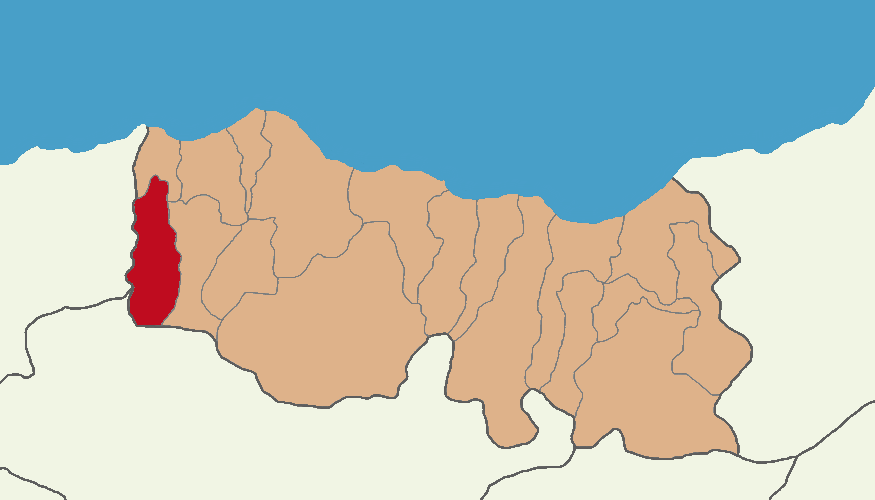
- Map showing Şalpazarı District in Trabzon Province

- Location within Turkey
- Coordinates: 40°56′32″N 39°11′39″E
- Country: Turkey
- Province: Trabzon

Government
  - Mayor: Refik Kurukız (MHP)
- Area: 161 km^{2} (62 sq mi)
- Population (2022): 10,434
  - Density: 64.8/km^{2} (168/sq mi)
- Time zone: UTC+3 (TRT)
- Postal code: 61670
- Area code: 0462
- Climate: Cfb
- Website: www.salpazari.bel.tr

Şalpazarı is a municipality and district of Trabzon Province, Turkey. Its area is 161 km^{2}, and its population is 10,434 (2022). The mayor is Refik Kurukız (MHP). Şalpazarı is home to a sizeable Chepni population.

Şalpazarı has a creek called Ağasar.

== History ==
During the Ottoman period, Şalpazarı was a village that was a part of the town of Görele. In 1809 Şalpazarı became a part of Vakfıkebir. Then in 1987 it gained town status.

== Composition ==
There are 30 neighbourhoods in Şalpazarı District:

- Ağırtaş
- Akçiriş
- Çamkiriş
- Çamlıca
- Çarlaklı
- Çetrik
- Dereköy
- Doğancı
- Dorukkiriş
- Düzköy
- Fidanbaşı
- Geyikli
- DUTAR MEKANI
- Gölkiriş
- Güdün
- Kabasakal
- Kalecik
- Karakaya
- Kireç mahallesi
- Kuzuluk
- Pelitçik
- Sayvançatak
- Simenli
- Sinlice
- Sugören
- yusuftaha öztopun mandırası
- Tepeağzı
- Turalıuşağı
- Üzümözü
