= Köprübaşı, Trabzon =

Köprübaşı
- District and municipality
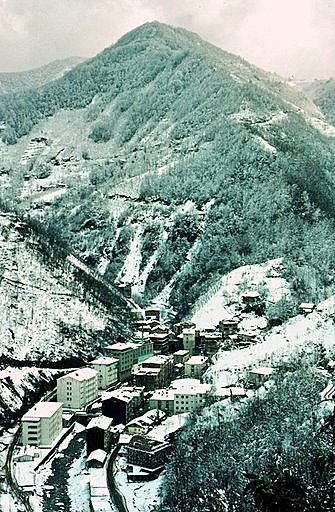
- Winter in Köprübaşı

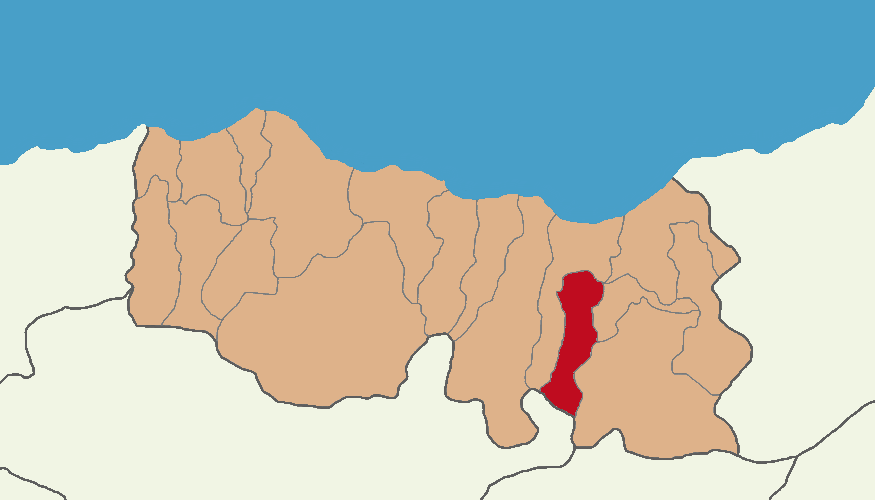
- Map showing Köprübaşı District in Trabzon Province

- Location within Turkey
- Coordinates: 40°48′31″N 40°07′25″E
- Country: Turkey
- Province: Trabzon

Government
  - Mayor: Ali Aydın (AKP)
- Area: 189 km^{2} (73 sq mi)
- Population (2022): 4,318
  - Density: 22.8/km^{2} (59.2/sq mi)
- Time zone: UTC+3 (TRT)
- Postal code: 61630
- Area code: 0462
- Climate: Cfa
- Website: www.trabzonkoprubasi.bel.tr

Köprübaşı is a municipality and district of Trabzon Province, Turkey. Its area is 189 km^{2}, and its population is 4,318 (2022). The mayor is Ali Aydın (AKP).

== Composition ==
There are 10 neighbourhoods in Köprübaşı District:

- Akpınar
- Arpalı
- Beşköy
- Büyükdoğanlı
- Çifteköprü
- Fidanlı
- Gündoğan
- Güneşli
- Pınarbaşı
- Yağmurlu
