= Arsin, Turkey =

Arsin
- District and municipality
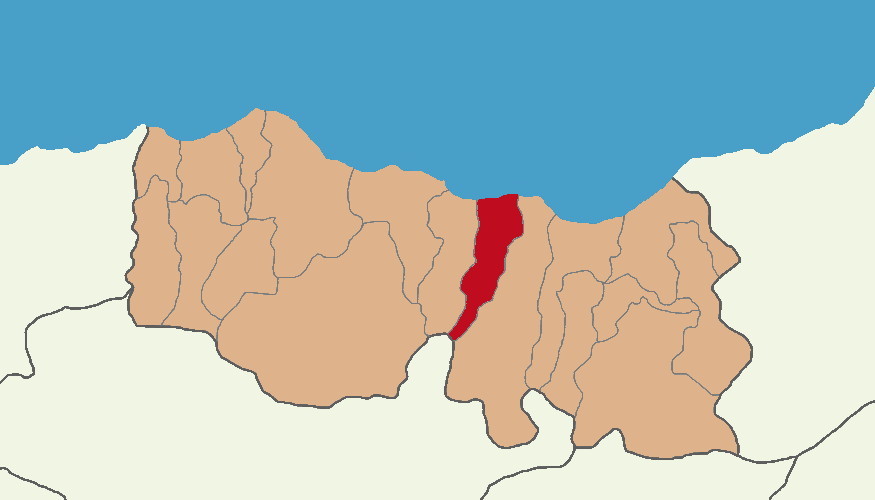
- Map showing Arsin District in Trabzon Province

- Location within Turkey
- Coordinates: 40°57′N 39°56′E
- Country: Turkey
- Province: Trabzon

Government
  - Mayor: Hamza Bilgin (AKP)
- Area: 157 km^{2} (61 sq mi)
- Population (2022): 30,911
  - Density: 197/km^{2} (510/sq mi)
- Time zone: UTC+3 (TRT)
- Area code: 0462
- Climate: Cfa
- Website: www.arsin.bel.tr

Arsin is a municipality and district of Trabzon Province, Turkey. Its area is 157 km^{2}, and its population is 30,911 (2022). It is on the Black Sea coast, east of the city of Trabzon. The mayor is Hamza Bilgin, a member of YRP.

== Composition ==
There are 36 neighbourhoods in Arsin District:

- Atayurt
- Başdurak
- Çardaklı
- Çiçekli
- Çubuklu
- Cudibey
- Cumhuriyet
- Dilek
- Elmaalan
- Fatih
- Fındıklı
- Gölcük
- Gölgelik
- Güneyce
- Güzelyalı
- Harmanlı
- İşhan
- Işıklı
- Karaca
- Konak
- Kuzguncuk
- Nuroğlu
- Oğuz
- Örnek
- Özlü
- Şankaya
- Üçpınar
- Yalı
- Yeniköy
- Yenimahalle
- Yeşilce
- Yeşilköy
- Yeşiltepe
- Yeşilyalı
- Yolaç
- Yolüstü
