= Tonya, Turkey =

Tonya
- District and municipality
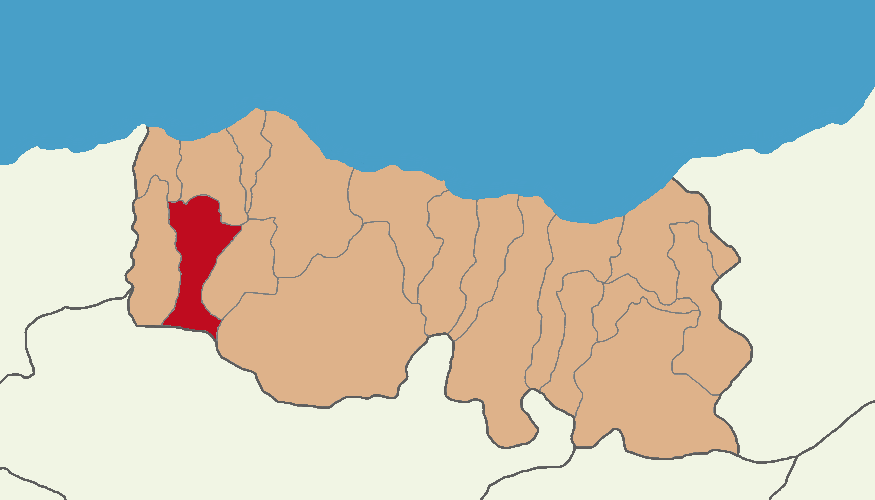
- Map showing Tonya District in Trabzon Province

- Location within Turkey
- Coordinates: 40°53′08″N 39°17′32″E
- Country: Turkey
- Province: Trabzon

Government
  - Mayor: Osman Beşel (AKP)
- Area: 176 km^{2} (68 sq mi)
- Elevation: 730 m (2,400 ft)
- Population (2022): 13,457
  - Density: 76.5/km^{2} (198/sq mi)
- Time zone: UTC+3 (TRT)
- Postal code: 61500
- Area code: 0462
- Climate: Cfb
- Website: www.tonya.bel.tr

Tonya (Ancient Greek: Thoania, Θωανία; Ottoman Turkish: طﻮﻧﻴﻪ, romanized as Tonya) is a municipality and district of Trabzon Province, Turkey. Its area is 176 km^{2}, and its population is 13,457 (2022). The mayor is Osman Beşel (AKP).

== Composition ==
There are 22 neighbourhoods in Tonya District:

- Biçinlik
- Büyükmahalle
- Çamlı
- Çayıriçi
- Hoşarlı
- İskenderli
- Kalemli
- Kaleönü
- Kalınçam
- Karaağaçlı
- Karasu
- Karşular
- Kayacan
- Kösecik
- Kozluca
- Melikşah
- Ortamahalle
- Sağrı
- Sayraç
- Turalı
- Yakçukur
- Yenimahalle

== Notable natives ==
- Meryem Küçükbirinci (born 2004), national footballer

== See also ==
Kadıralak Nature Park
