= Hayrat =

- District and municipality
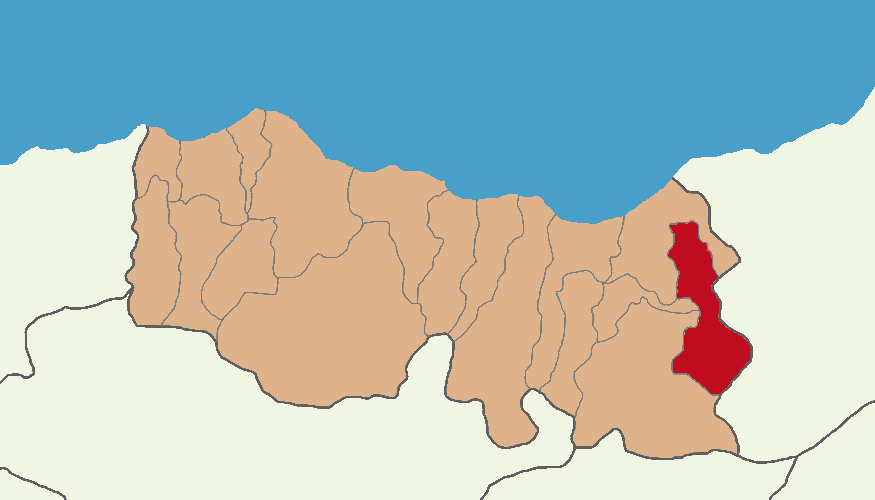
- Map showing Hayrat District in Trabzon Province

- Location within Turkey
- Coordinates: 40°53′21″N 40°22′04″E
- Country: Turkey
- Province: Trabzon

Government
  - Mayor: Mehmet Nuhoğlu (AKP)
- Area: 244 km^{2} (94 sq mi)
- Population (2022): 7,667
  - Density: 31.4/km^{2} (81.4/sq mi)
- Time zone: UTC+3 (TRT)
- Postal code: 61450
- Area code: 0462
- Climate: Cfa
- Website: www.hayrat.bel.tr

Hayrat is a municipality and district of Trabzon Province, Turkey. Its area is 244 km^{2}, and its population is 7,667 (2022). The mayor is Mehmet Nuhoğlu (AKP).

== History ==
During World War I, occupied by the Russians, Hayrat was freed from the occupation on 28 February 1918.

== Composition ==
There are 35 neighbourhoods in Hayrat District:

- Ağaçlı Düz
- Balaban
- Balaban Merkez
- Çağlayan
- Çamlıtepe
- Çaycılar
- Cumhuriyet
- Dağönü
- Dereyurt
- Fatih
- Geçitli
- Göksel
- Görgülü
- Gülderen Fatih
- Gülderen Merkez
- Hamzalı
- Hürriyet
- Kılavuz
- Köyceğiz
- Kurtuluş
- Merkez
- Meydanlı
- Onurlu
- Pazarönü
- Pınarca
- Sarmaşık
- Şehitli
- Şişli
- Taflancık
- Topaklı
- Yarlı
- Yeniköy
- Yenimahalle
- Yıldırımlar
- Yırca
