= Beşikdüzü =

- District and municipality
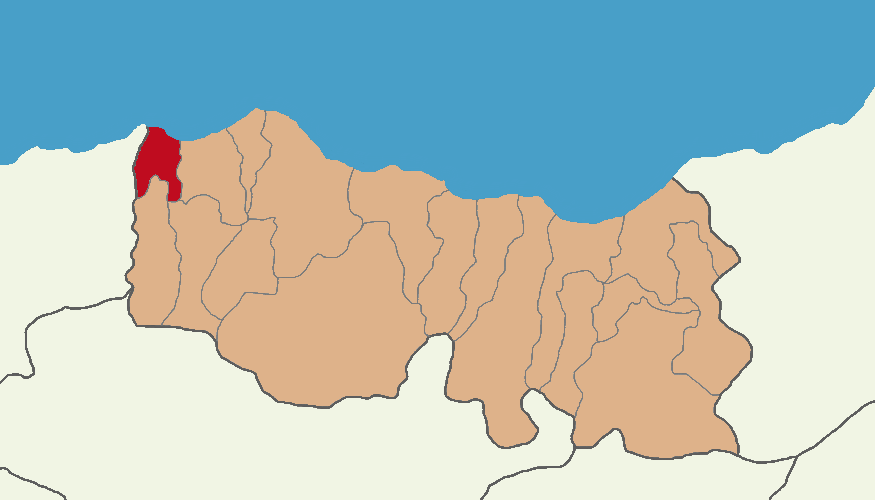
- Map showing Beşikdüzü District in Trabzon Province

- Location within Turkey
- Coordinates: 41°2′58″N 39°14′7″E
- Country: Turkey
- Province: Trabzon

Government
  - Mayor: Burhan Cahit Erdem (CHP)
- Area: 84 km^{2} (32 sq mi)
- Population (2022): 23,774
  - Density: 280/km^{2} (730/sq mi)
- Time zone: UTC+3 (TRT)
- Postal code: 61800
- Area code: 0462
- Climate: Cfa
- Website: www.besikduzu.bel.tr

Beşikdüzü is a municipality and district of Trabzon Province, Turkey. Its area is 84 km^{2}, and its population is 23,774 (2022). The mayor is Burhan Cahit Erdem (CHP).

== Composition ==
There are 34 neighbourhoods in Beşikdüzü District:

- Adacık
- Ağaçlı
- Akkese
- Aksaklı
- Ambarlı
- Ardıçatak
- Bayırköy
- Beşikdağı
- Bozlu
- Çakırlı
- Çeşmeönü
- Çıtlaklı
- Cumhuriyet
- Dağlıca
- Denizli
- Dolanlı
- Duygulu
- Fatih
- Gürgenli
- Hünerli
- Kalegüney
- Korkuthan
- Kutluca
- Nefsişarlı
- Oguz
- Resullü
- Şahmelik
- Sayvancık
- Seyitahmet
- Takazlı
- Vardallı
- Yenicami
- Yeşilköy
- Zemberek
