= Çarşıbaşı =

- District and municipality
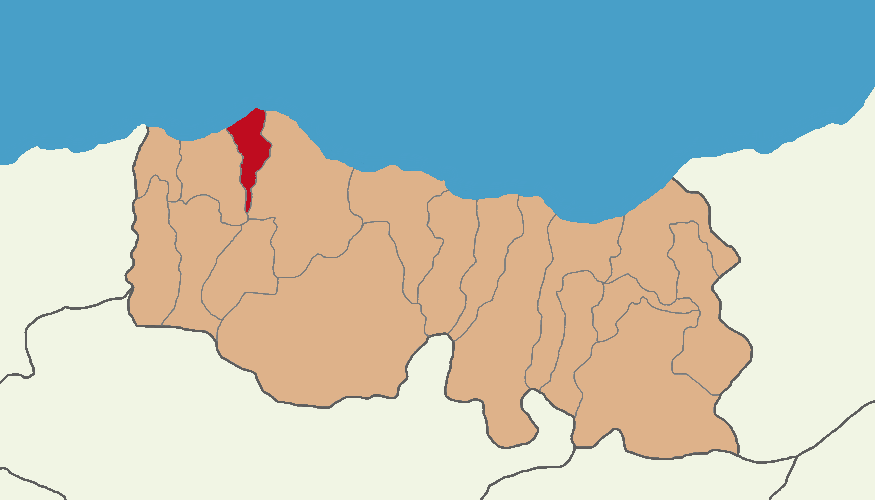
- Map showing Çarşıbaşı District in Trabzon Province

- Location within Turkey
- Coordinates: 41°05′N 39°23′E
- Country: Turkey
- Province: Trabzon

Government
  - Mayor: Ahmet Keleş (MHP)
- Area: 66 km^{2} (25 sq mi)
- Population (2022): 15,227
  - Density: 230/km^{2} (600/sq mi)
- Time zone: UTC+3 (TRT)
- Postal code: 61420
- Area code: 0462
- Climate: Cfa
- Website: www.carsibasi.bel.tr

Çarşıbaşı (Ottoman Turkish: İskefiye) is a municipality and district of Trabzon Province, Turkey. Its area is 66 km^{2}, and its population is 15,227 (2022). On 31 March 2024, Ahmet Keleş (MHP) was elected mayor. Çarşıbaşı is 34 km from Giresun, on the west coastal road. Its old name being “İskefiye”, Çarşıbaşı revised their name in 1962. Çarşıbaşı was also called “Pazaronu,” as it was the main place to stay for those traveling to the famous marketplace in Vakfıkebir.

== History ==
Though, people first living in the town of Çarşıbaşı are unknown, legend has it that the “Miletus” tribe were the first group of people to settle in the town of Çarşıbaşı. Miletus moved to Black Sea because of economic purposes, hoping to explore new monetary resources. The Miletus tribe, first settled in on cities on the coast such as Sinop and established colonies, and then advanced to the East of Black Sea. The Miletus then enhanced their authority in Çarşıbaşı by taking control of the surrounding regions and continued their jurisdiction for over 700 years. In the meantime, they controlled Trabzon and territories in the Black Sea by sending missionaries.

After the reign of the Miletus, the Persians ruled Çarşıbaşı and held their power until the Hellenistic period. After the rule of the Persians, the Romans took over Çarşıbaşı and ruled until year 395. During this time, the Roman Empire divided into two and Çarşıbaşı, along with Trabzon went under the control of the East Roman Empire. Latins, then took over the Romans. Then, the Romans with the help of the Bulgarians, came to Trabzon and established the Portus Roman Empire.

The rule of the Portus Roman Empire came to an end as Mehmed II conquered Trabzon in 1461. Following the victory of Sultan Mehmed II, Çarşıbaşı followed strict policies and became a Turkish and Muslim district, along with many other towns in the Black Sea coast.

== Composition ==
There are 23 neighbourhoods in Çarşıbaşı District:

- Burunbaşı
- Büyükdere
- Çallı
- Çarşıbaşı
- Erenköy
- Fenerköy
- Gülbahçe
- Kadıköy
- Kaleköy
- Kavaklı
- Kerem
- Kovanlı
- Küçükköy
- Pınarlı
- Şahinli
- Salova
- Samsun
- Serpilköy
- Taşlıtepe
- Veliköy
- Yavuzköy
- Yeniköy
- Zeytinlik
