= Yomra =

- District and municipality
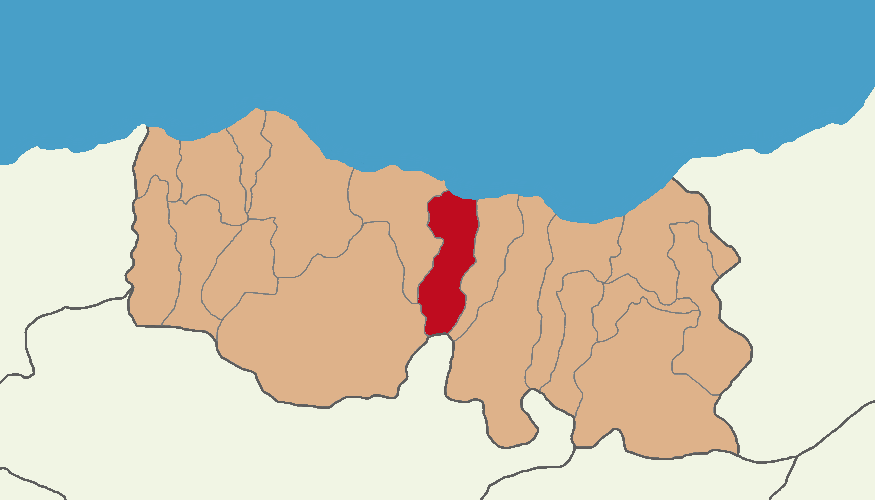
- Map showing Yomra District in Trabzon Province

- Location within Turkey
- Coordinates: 40°57′32″N 39°50′49″E
- Country: Turkey
- Province: Trabzon

Government
  - Mayor: Mustafa Bıyık (CHP)
- Area: 200 km^{2} (77 sq mi)
- Population (2022): 47,283
  - Density: 240/km^{2} (610/sq mi)
- Time zone: UTC+3 (TRT)
- Postal code: 61250
- Area code: 0462
- Climate: Cfa
- Website: www.yomra.bel.tr

Yomra (Greek: Γέμουρα) is a municipality and district of Trabzon Province, Turkey. Its area is 200 km^{2}, and its population is 47,283 (2022). The town lies on the Black Sea coast, east of the city of Trabzon. The mayor is Mustafa Bıyık (CHP).

== Composition ==
There are 25 neighbourhoods in Yomra District:

- Çamlıca
- Çamlıyurt
- Çınarlı
- Demirciler
- Gülyurdu
- Gürsel
- İkisu
- Kaşüstü
- Kayabaşı
- Kılıçlı
- Kıratlı
- Kömürcü
- Madenköy
- Namık Kemal
- Ocak
- Oymalı
- Özdil
- Pınarlı
- Sancak
- Şanlı
- Tandırlı
- Taşdelen
- Tepeköy
- Yenice
- Yokuşlu
