= Düzköy =

- District and municipality
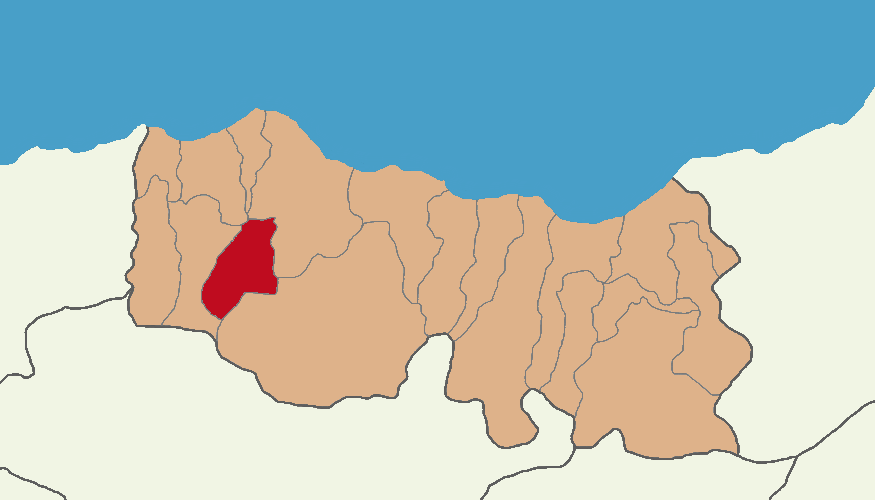
- Map showing Düzköy District in Trabzon Province

- Location within Turkey
- Coordinates: 40°52′27″N 39°25′32″E
- Country: Turkey
- Province: Trabzon

Government
  - Mayor: Yılmaz Ankara (AKP)
- Area: 125 km^{2} (48 sq mi)
- Population (2022): 13,312
  - Density: 106/km^{2} (276/sq mi)
- Time zone: UTC+3 (TRT)
- Postal code: 61390
- Area code: 0462
- Climate: Cfb
- Website: www.duzkoy.bel.tr

Düzköy (formerly Haçka) is a municipality and district of Trabzon Province, Turkey. Its area is 125 km^{2}, and its population is 13,312 (2022). The mayor is Yılmaz Ankara (AKP).

== Composition ==
There are 22 neighbourhoods in Düzköy District:

- Alazlı
- Aykut
- Büyükmahalle
- Çal Camili
- Çal Çeşmeler
- Çal Orta
- Çayırbağı Doğankaya
- Çayırbağı Gülcana
- Çayırbağı Orta
- Çayırbağı Yusuflu
- Çayırbağı Zeliha
- Cevizlik
- Çiğdemli
- Düzalan
- Gökçeler
- Gürgendağ
- Küçüktepeköy
- Ortamahalle
- Taşocağı
- Tepecik
- Yenimahalle
- Yerlice
