= Trabzon Province =

Province of Turkey

Coordinates: 40°46′50″N 39°48′44″E

Trabzon Province Trabzon ili
- Province and metropolitan municipality
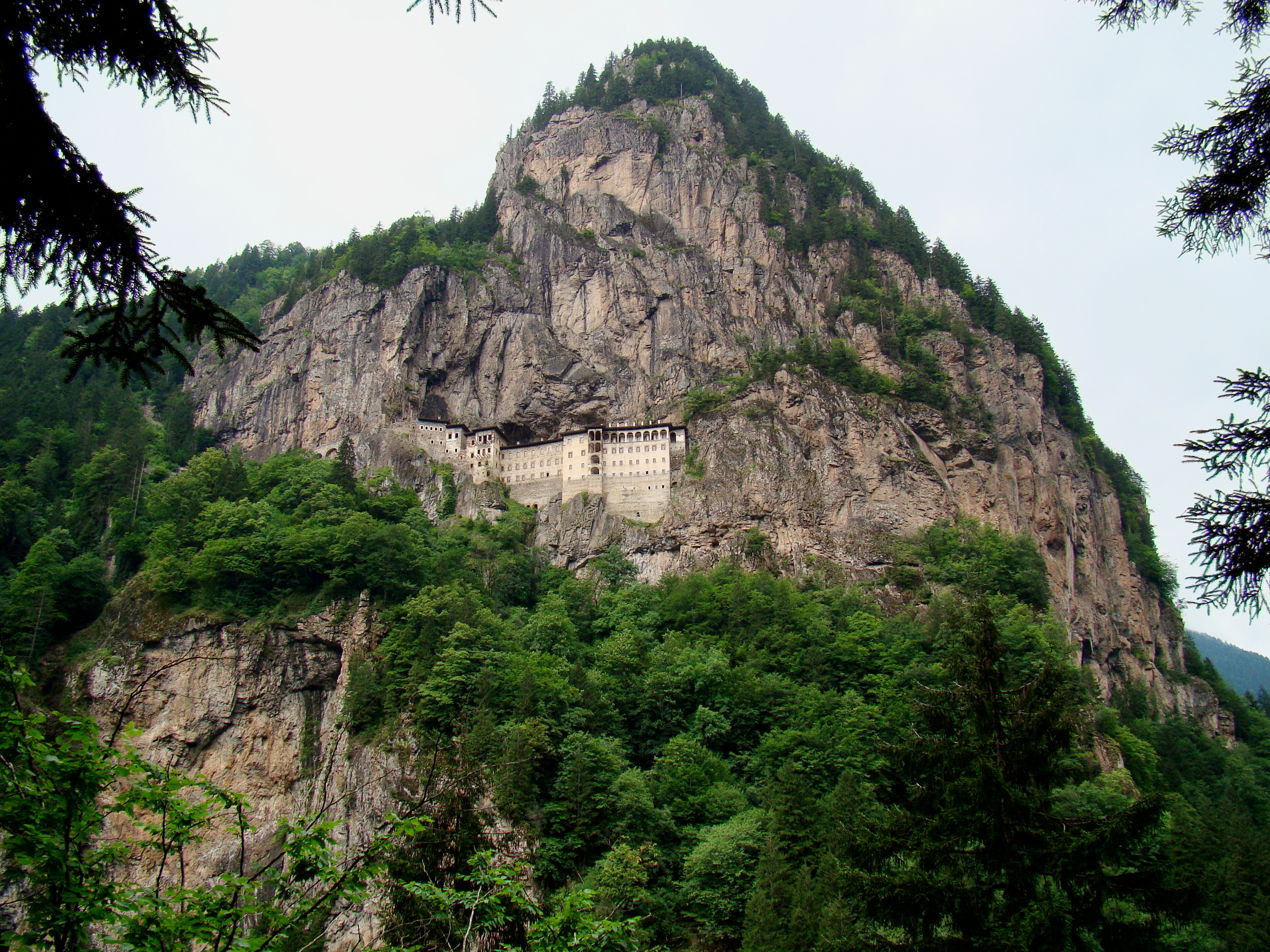
- Sumela Monastery

- Location of the province within Turkey
- Country: Turkey
- Seat: Trabzon

Government
  - Vali: Tahir Sahin
- Area: 4,628 km^{2} (1,787 sq mi)
- Population (2022): 818,023
  - Density: 176.8/km^{2} (457.8/sq mi)
- Time zone: UTC+3 (TRT)
- Area code: 0462
- Website: www.trabzon.bel.tr www.trabzon.gov.tr

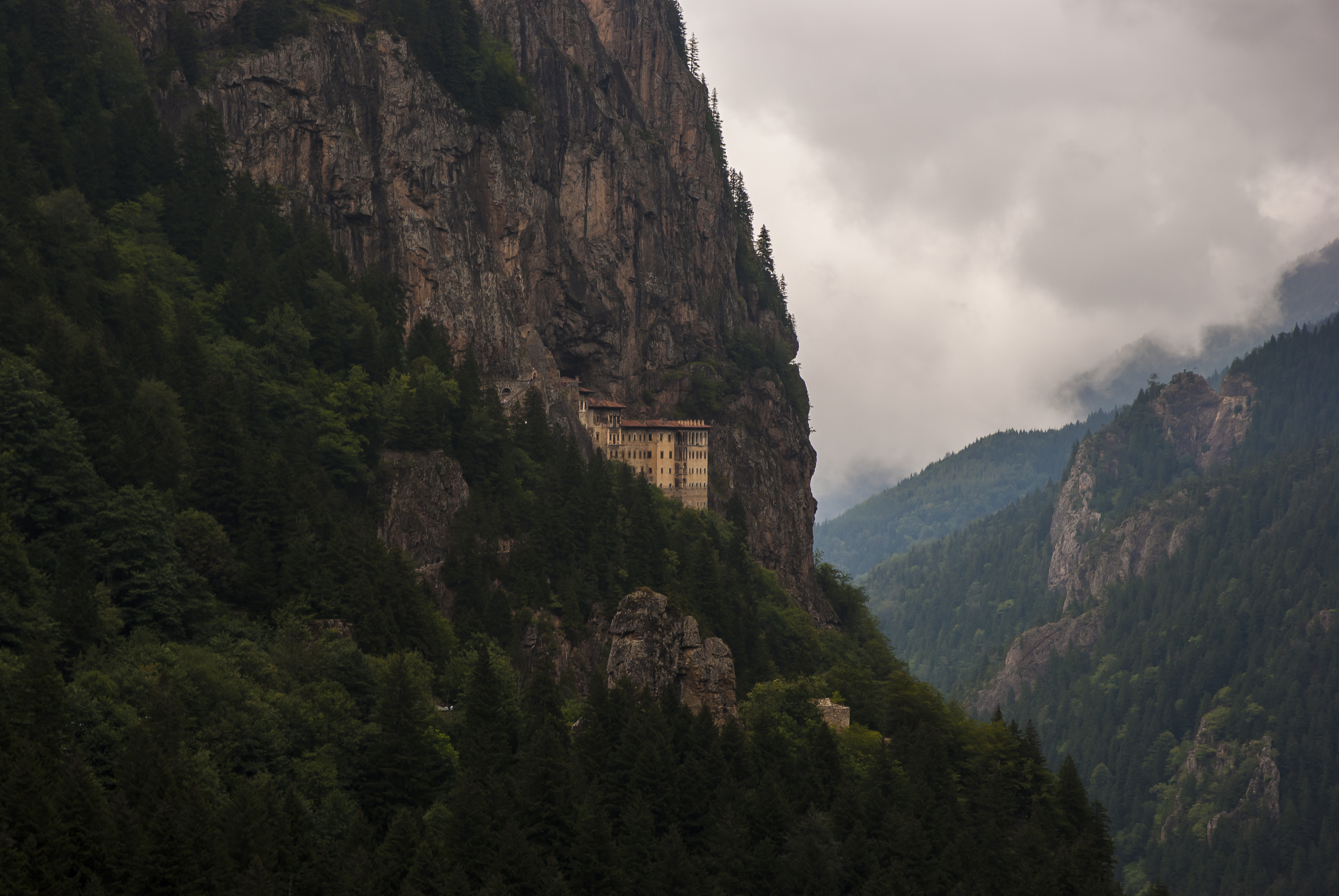
Altindere Sumela.

Trabzon Province (Turkish: Trabzon ili) is a province and metropolitan municipality of Turkey on the Black Sea coast. Its area is 4,628 km^{2}, and its population is 818,023 (2022). Located in a strategically important region, Trabzon is one of the oldest trade port cities in Anatolia. Neighbouring provinces are Giresun to the west, Gümüşhane to the southwest, Bayburt to the southeast and Rize to the east. Aziz Yıldırım was appointed Governor of the province in August 2023. The capital of the province is Trabzon.

== Districts ==
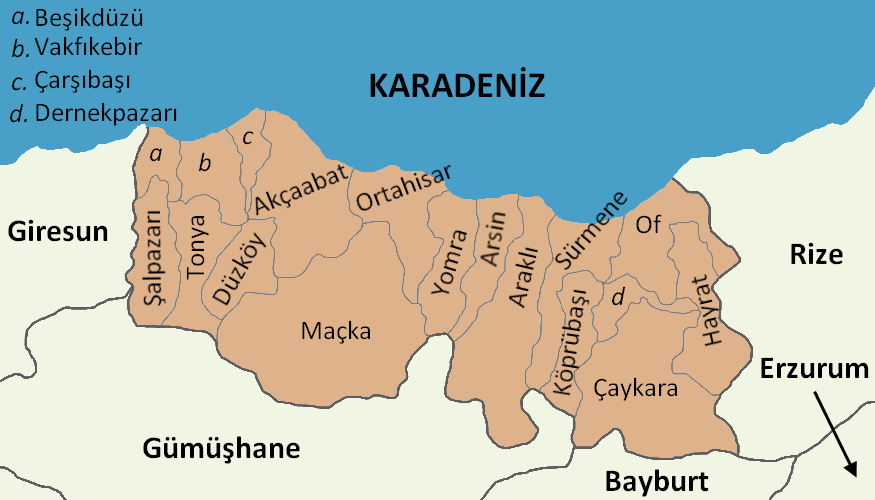

Trabzon province is divided into 18 districts:

- Akçaabat
- Araklı
- Arsin
- Beşikdüzü
- Çarşıbaşı
- Çaykara
- Dernekpazarı
- Düzköy
- Hayrat
- Köprübaşı
- Maçka
- Of
- Ortahisar
- Şalpazarı
- Sürmene
- Tonya
- Vakfıkebir
- Yomra

Districts along the 114 km coastline (from west to east): Beşikdüzü, Vakfıkebir, Çarşıbaşı, Akçaabat, Ortahisar, Yomra, Arsin, Araklı, Sürmene and Of.
Districts inland: Tonya, Düzköy, Şalpazarı, Maçka, Köprübaşı, Dernekpazarı, Hayrat and Çaykara.

Beşikdüzü and Şalpazarı gained district status in 1988, Çarşıbaşı, Düzköy, Köprübaşı, Dernekpazarı and Hayrat in 1990. The district Ortahisar was created from the former central district of Trabzon Province at the 2013 Turkish local government reorganisation.

== History ==
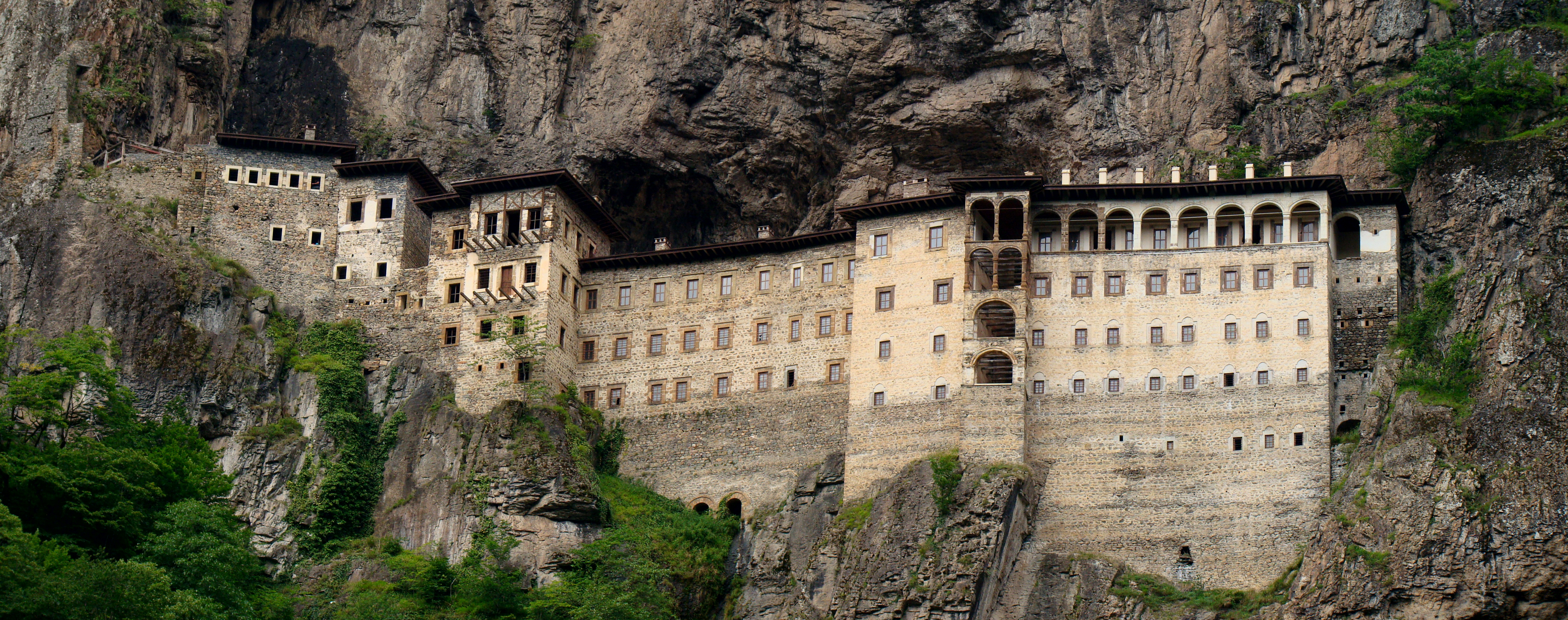
Sümela Monastery in the, near Maçka

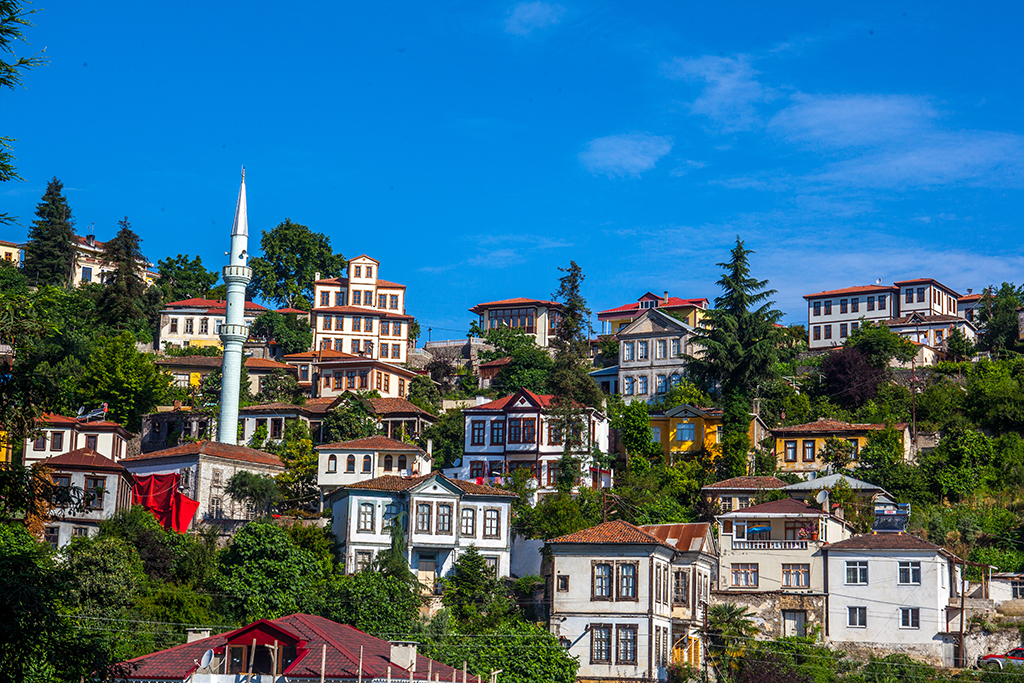
Ortamahalle in Akçaabat district

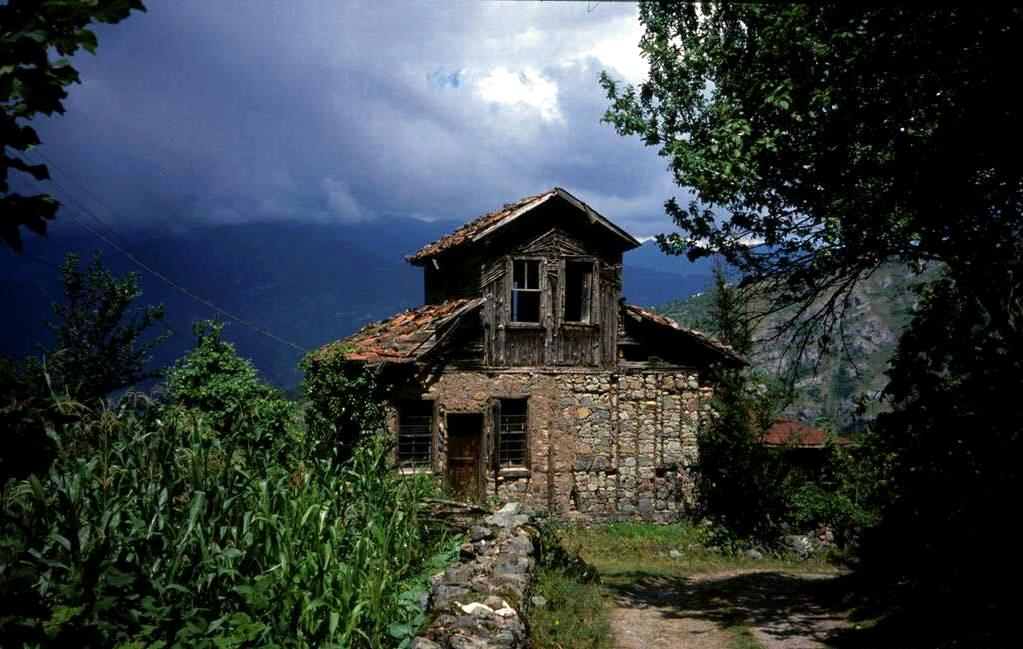
A traditional rural Pontic house in Livera village, Maçka district

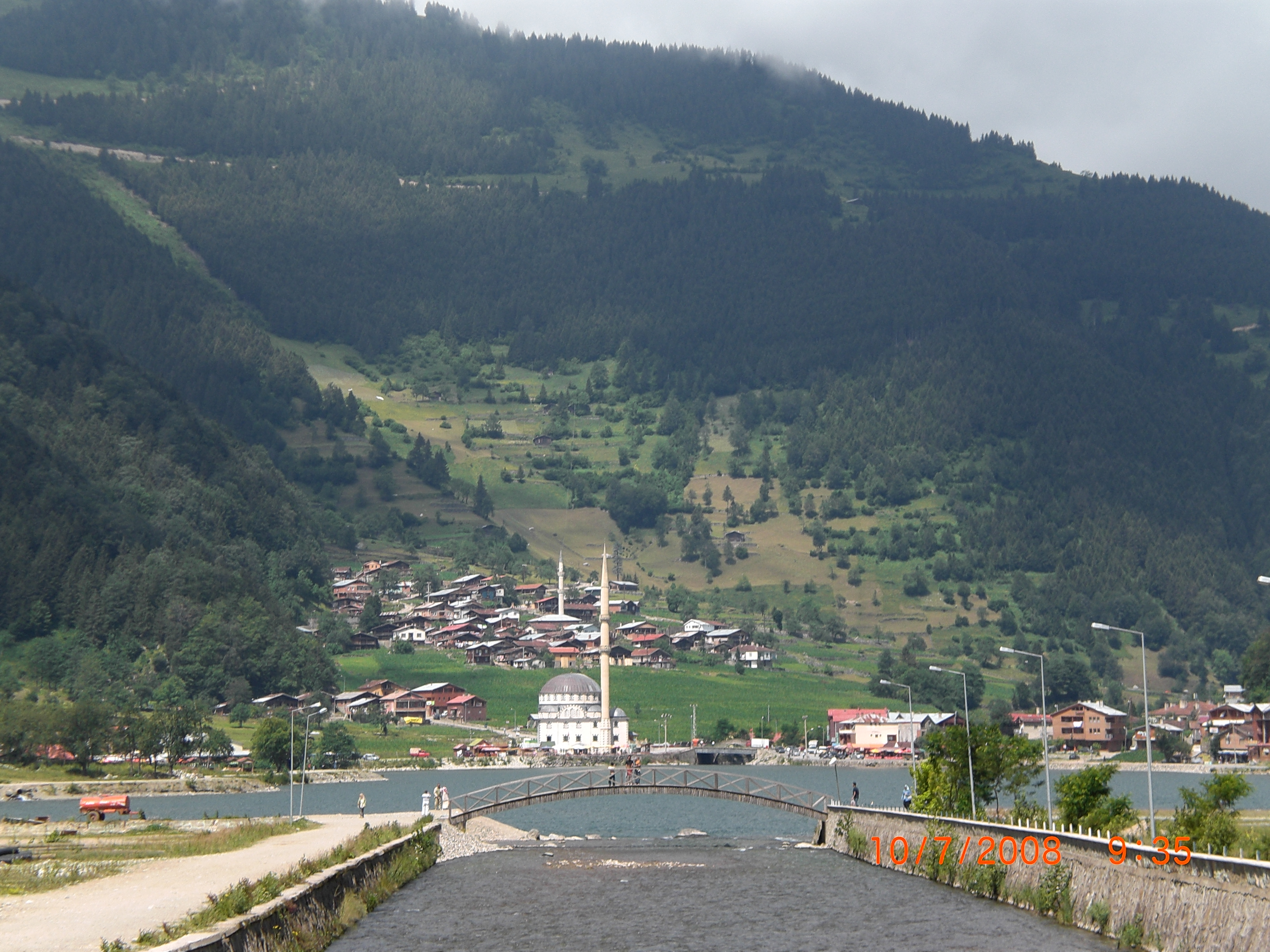
Uzungöl village and lake in Çaykara

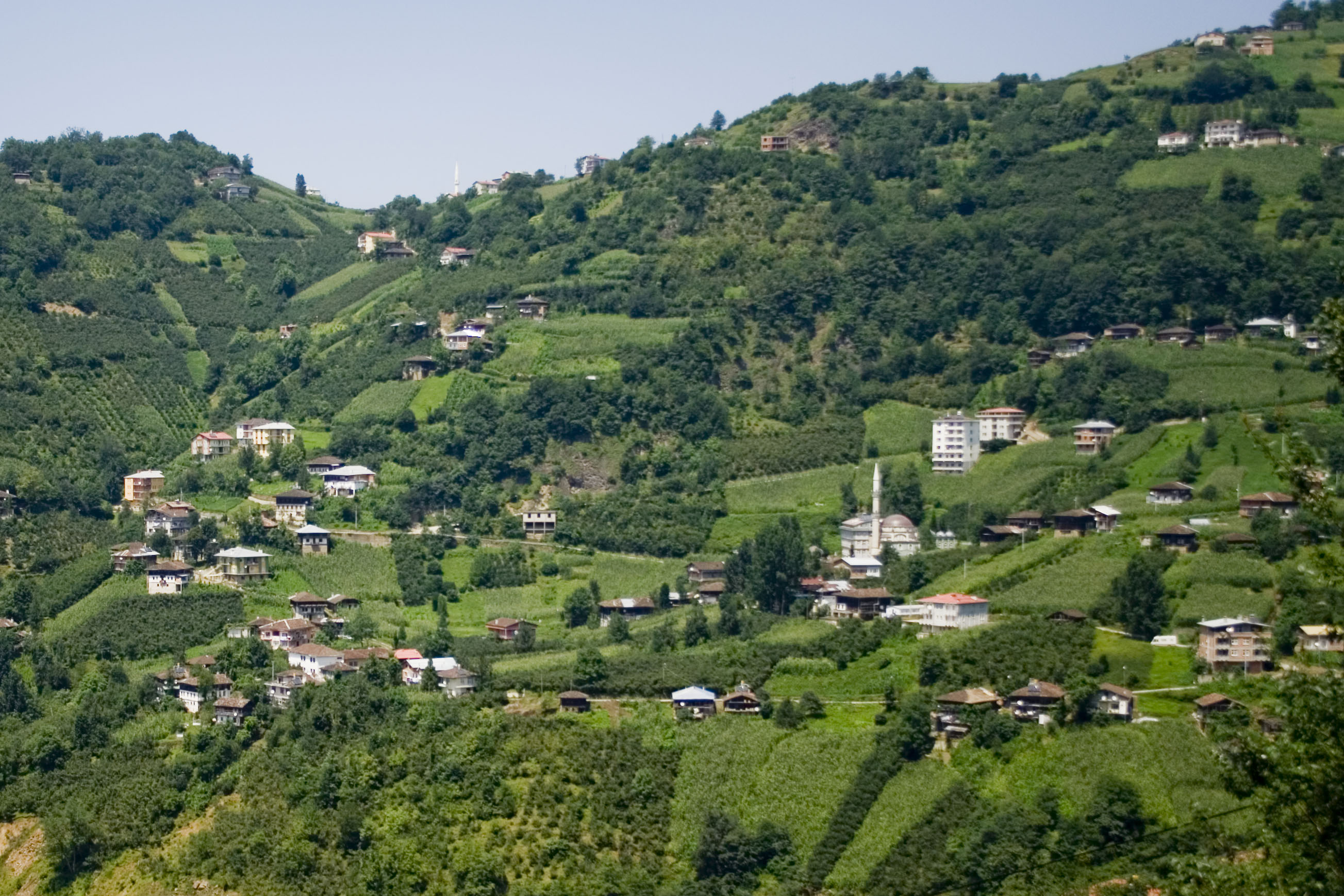
Another village in Çaykara

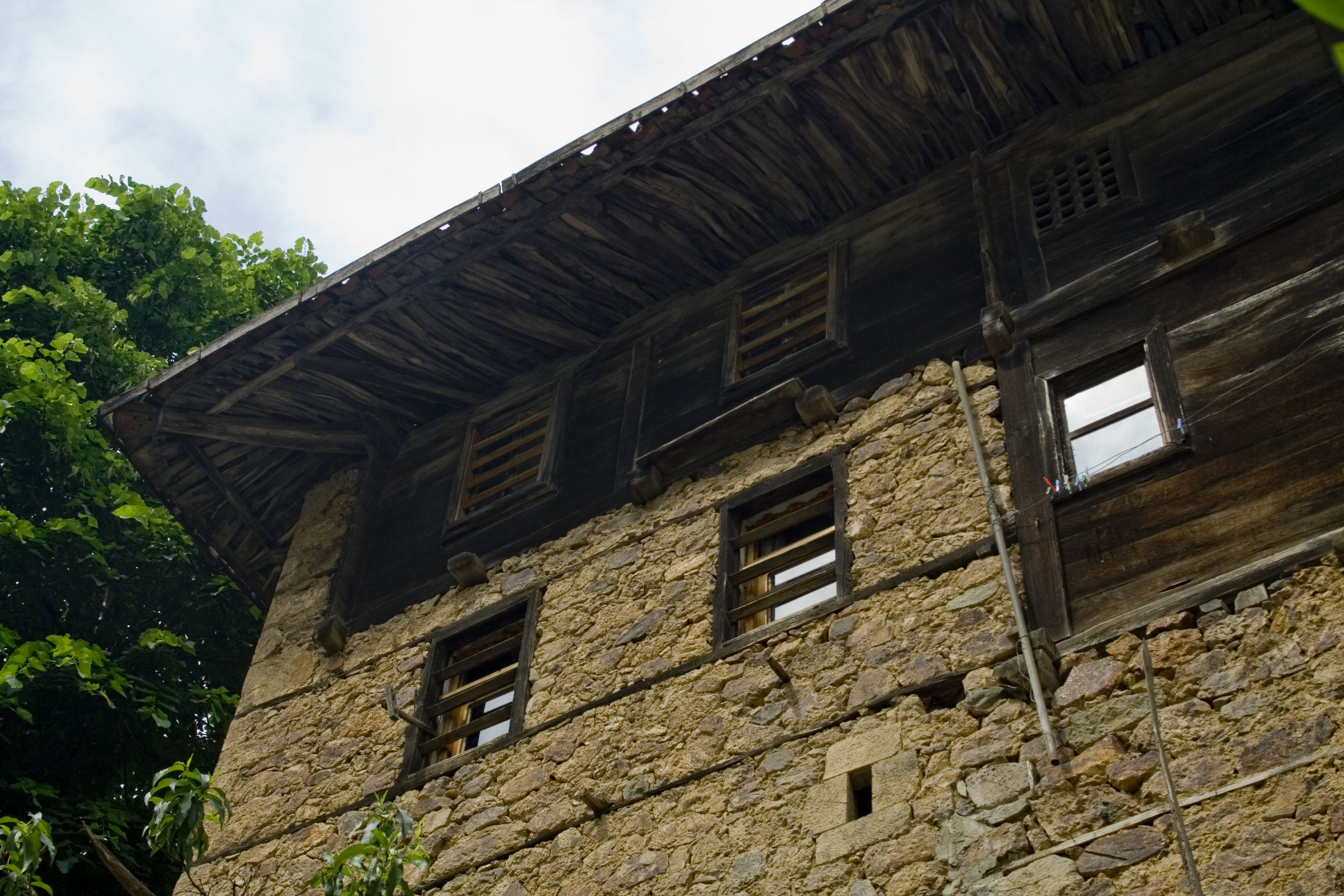
A traditional house in Çaykara

Remarkably attractive throughout its history, Trabzon was the subject of hundreds of travel books by western travellers, some of whom had named it "city of tale in the East." The capital city Trabzon was founded, as Trapezus, by Greek colonists from Sinope, modern Sinop, Turkey. Starting from the 9th century BC, the city had also been mentioned by historians such as Homeros, Herodotus, Hesiodos. The first written source regarding Trabzon is Anabasis, authored by Xenophon.

An important Roman and Byzantine centre, it was the capital of the Empire of Trebizond from 1204 to 1461. Trabzon was subsequently made part of the Ottoman Empire by Mehmet the Conqueror. After the region was conquered in 1461, the Fatih Medrese (1462), Hatuniye Medrese (1515), İskender Pasha Medrese (1529) and Hamza Pasha Medrese (1543) were established as important medreses (educational centers; some of them within külliye complexes) of the period. It was initially a sanjak before gaining the status of eyalet, and finally became a vilayet in 1868.

The province was a site of major fighting between Ottoman and Russian forces during the Caucasus Campaign of World War I, which resulted in the capture of the city of Trabzon by the Russian army under command of Grand Duke Nicholas and Nikolai Yudenich in April 1916. The province was restored to Turkish control in early 1918 following Russia's exit from World War I with the Treaty of Brest-Litovsk.

1914-1923: Turkish Genocide of Pontic Greeks https://en.wikipedia.org/wiki/Pontic_Greek_genocide.

=== In Turkey ===
In September 1935 the third Inspectorate General (Umumi Müfettişlik, UM) was created. Its creation was based on the Law 1164 from June 1927, which was passed in order to Turkefy the population. The Trabzon province was included in this area. The third UM span over the provinces of Erzurum, Artvin, Rize, Trabzon, Kars, Gümüşhane, Erzincan and Ağrı. It was governed by an Inspector General seated in the city of Erzurum. The Inspectorate General was dissolved in 1952 during the Government of the Democrat Party.

=== Archaeology ===
In April 2021, archaeologists announced the discovery of Roman and Byzantine period archeological remains in the Ortahisar district. The southern part of the wicker columns and fortifications of the Roman emperor Hadrian's period, trench walls of Byzantine period dating back to 1460 have been discovered. Remains of Roman tiles and pottery were also discovered during the excavations. According to the Trabzon City Municipality, the excavation area is planned to be turned into an open-air museum.

== Attractions ==
- Hagia Sophia of Trabzon
- Trabzon Castle
- Kalepark
- Sümela Monastery
- Kuştul Monastery
- Kaymaklı Monastery
- Vazelon Monastery
- Kızlar Monastery
- Fatih Mosque
- Yeni Cuma Mosque
- Nakip Mosque
- İskender Pasha Mosque
- Lake Uzungöl
- Pontic Mountains
- Saint Michael Church, also known as 'Saint Joseph Kilisesi', Akçaabat, Ortamahalle.

== Demographics ==
Historical population

Year	Pop.	±% p.a.
1927	290,303	—
1935	360,679	+2.75%
1940	390,733	+1.61%
1945	395,733	+0.25%
1950	420,279	+1.21%
1955	462,249	+1.92%
1960	532,999	+2.89%
1965	595,782	+2.25%
1970	659,120	+2.04%
1975	719,008	+1.75%

Year	Pop.	±% p.a.
1980	731,045	+0.33%
1985	786,194	+1.47%
1990	795,849	+0.24%
1997	858,687	+1.09%
2000	979,081	+4.47%
2007	740,569	−3.91%
2012	757,898	+0.46%
2017	786,326	+0.74%
2022	818,023	+0.79%

Source: TÜIK (2007–2022)

== See also ==
- World Trade Center Trabzon
- Trabzon Museum
- Chepni
- Pontic Greeks
- Kadirga Festival
