= Araklı Arena =

Indoor volleyball venue in Turkey

- Interactive map of Araklı Arena
- Full name: Araklı Spor Salonu
- Location: Araklı, Trabzon, Turkey
- Coordinates: 40°55′40.4″N 40°02′59.5″E
- Capacity: 500
- Surface: Wood flooring
- Scoreboard: yes

Construction
- Built: 2006

Tenants
- 2007 Black Sea Games; 2011 European Youth Summer Olympic Festival

Araklı Arena (Turkish: Araklı Spor Salonu) is an indoor volleyball venue located in Araklı town of Trabzon Province, Turkey. Built in 2006, the arena has a capacity of 500 spectators.

In 2007, the venue hosted the 1st Black Sea Games. Volleyball matches for boys were played at this arena during the 2011 European Youth Summer Olympic Festival.

== See also ==
- Araklı
- World Trade Center Trabzon
- Trabzon Museum
- Trabzon
- Chepni
- Pontic Greeks
- Kadirga Festival
