= Trabzon 19 Mayıs Arena =

Indoor basketball venue in Trabzon, Turkey

- Interactive map of Trabzon 19 Mayıs Arena
- Full name: Trabzon 19 Mayıs Spor Salonu
- Coordinates: 41.00414°N 39.70750°E
- Capacity: 1,100
- Surface: Wood flooring
- Scoreboard: yes

Construction
- Built: 1951
- Renovated: 2010

Tenants
- 2007 Black Sea Games; 2011 European Youth Summer Olympic Festival

Trabzon 19 Mayıs Arena (Turkish: Trabzon 19 Mayıs Spor Salonu) is an indoor basketball venue located in Trabzon, Turkey.

Built in 1951, the venue hosted the 2007 Black Sea Games. Following renovation works in 2010, basketball matches for girls were played at this arena during the 2011 European Youth Summer Olympic Festival.

The arena is home to the basketball teams of the clubs Trabzonspor Basketball, Trabzon İdmanocağı and Trabzon Belediyesi S.K.
