= World Trade Center Trabzon =

Building complex in Trabzon, Turkey

Coordinates: 40.9683°N 39.8372°E

World Trade Center Trabzon (AWTCT) (Turkish: Trabzon Dünya Ticaret Merkezi, AWTCT) is under development by Armada Holding Sti (part of Armada Group) by Build-Operate-Transfer (BOT) agreement with Trabzon Dünya Ticaret Merkezi A.Ş. The construction started in December 2016 and expected to be completed in 18 months When completed it is expected to have 4 and 5-Star Hotels and to organize trade delegation programs, operates fair areas and offers Office, Convention and Meeting Halls.

The complex of World Trade Center Trabzon is situated close to Trabzon Airport.

== Services and facilities ==
There are multiple exhibition halls, a mixed-usage building with offices and residential units in addition to retail space.

=== WTC Trabzon Business Center ===
Offers office space in three separate plazas with buildup area of 80,000 m^{2} (860,000 sq ft). In addition, its parking lot is capable of 700 Cars.

=== Convention Center ===
The complex also houses the biggest convention center in Trabzon with a seating capacity for 2100 visitors.

=== Hotels ===
There are two Hotels, a Five-Star Hotel and a Four-Star Hotel.

== See also ==
- Trabzon Province
- Trabzon Museum
- Trabzon
- Chepni
- Pontic Greeks
- Kadirga Festival
- Araklı
- Araklı Arena
