= Alperay Demirciler =

Turkish volleyball player

Personal information
- Nationality: Turkish
- Born: 1 February 1993 (age 33)
- Height: 1.78 m (5 ft 10 in)
- Weight: 72 kg (159 lb)
- Spike: 375 cm (148 in)
- Block: 263 cm (104 in)

Volleyball information
- Position: Libero
- Current club: Develi Belediyespor

Career
Teams
- TVF Sports High School
- Galatasaray Volleyball junior's
- Fenerbahçe

National team
2011–	Turkey
Honours
Men's volleyball
Representing Turkey
European League
Silver medal – second place	2012 Ankara
- Last updated: 1 September 2013

Alperay Demirciler (born 1 February 1993) is a Turkish volleyball player. The 1.78 m (5 ft 10 in) tall athlete plays in the libero position. He is a member of Develi Belediyespor (men volleyball team) Demirciler plays for the Turkey men's junior national team and Turkey national team. He took part also in the boys' youth national team.

He is a member of the Member of the Turkish Men's Junior National Team and the Turkish National Team.

== Career ==
Demirciler received his primary and middle school education at Turkish-Swedish Friendship School in Esenler, Istanbul. He finished later the TVF Fine Arts and Sports High School in Ankara.

He won the gold medal with the boys' youth national team at the 2011 European Youth Olympic Festival held in Trabzon, Turkey. At the 2012 Men's European Volleyball League, he took the silver medal with the Turkey national team.

== Awards ==
=== Individual ===
- 2013 FIVB Volleyball Men's U21 World Championship "Best Libero"

=== National team ===
- 2011 European Youth Olympic Festival - Gold Medal
- 2012 Men's European Volleyball League - Silver Medal
