= Yomra Arena =

Sport arena

- Interactive map of Yomra Arena
- Full name: Yomra Spor Salonu
- Location: Yomra, Trabzon, Turkey
- Coordinates: 40°57′23.1″N 39°51′55.4″E
- Capacity: 500
- Surface: Wood flooring
- Scoreboard: yes

Tenants
- 2007 Black Sea Games; 2011 European Youth Summer Olympic Festival

Yomra Arena (Turkish: Yomra Spor Salonu) is an indoor multi-purpose sports venue located in Yomra town of Trabzon Province, Turkey. The arena has a seating capacity of 500 spectators.

The arena hosted the wrestling events at the 2007 Black Sea Games and gymnastics event for girls during the 2011 European Youth Summer Olympic Festival.
