= Vakfıkebir Arena =

Indoor sports stadium in Vakfıkebir, Trabzon, Turkey

- Interactive map of Vakfıkebir Arena
- Full name: Vakfıkebir Spor Salonu
- Location: Vakfıkebir, Trabzon, Turkey
- Coordinates: 41°02′19.9″N 39°16′43.9″E
- Capacity: 10.787
- Surface: Wood flooring
- Scoreboard: yes

Tenants
- 2007 Black Sea Games; 2011 European Youth Summer Olympic Festival

Vakfıkebir Arena (Turkish: Vakfıkebir Spor Salonu) is an indoor multi-purpose sports venue located in Vakfıkebir town of Trabzon Province, Turkey. The arena has a capacity of 10.787 spectators.

The arena hosted the Taekwonde events at the 2007 Black Sea Games and handball event for girls during the 2011 European Youth Summer Olympic Festival.
