= Söğütlü Athletics Stadium =

Sports venue in Trabzon, Turkey

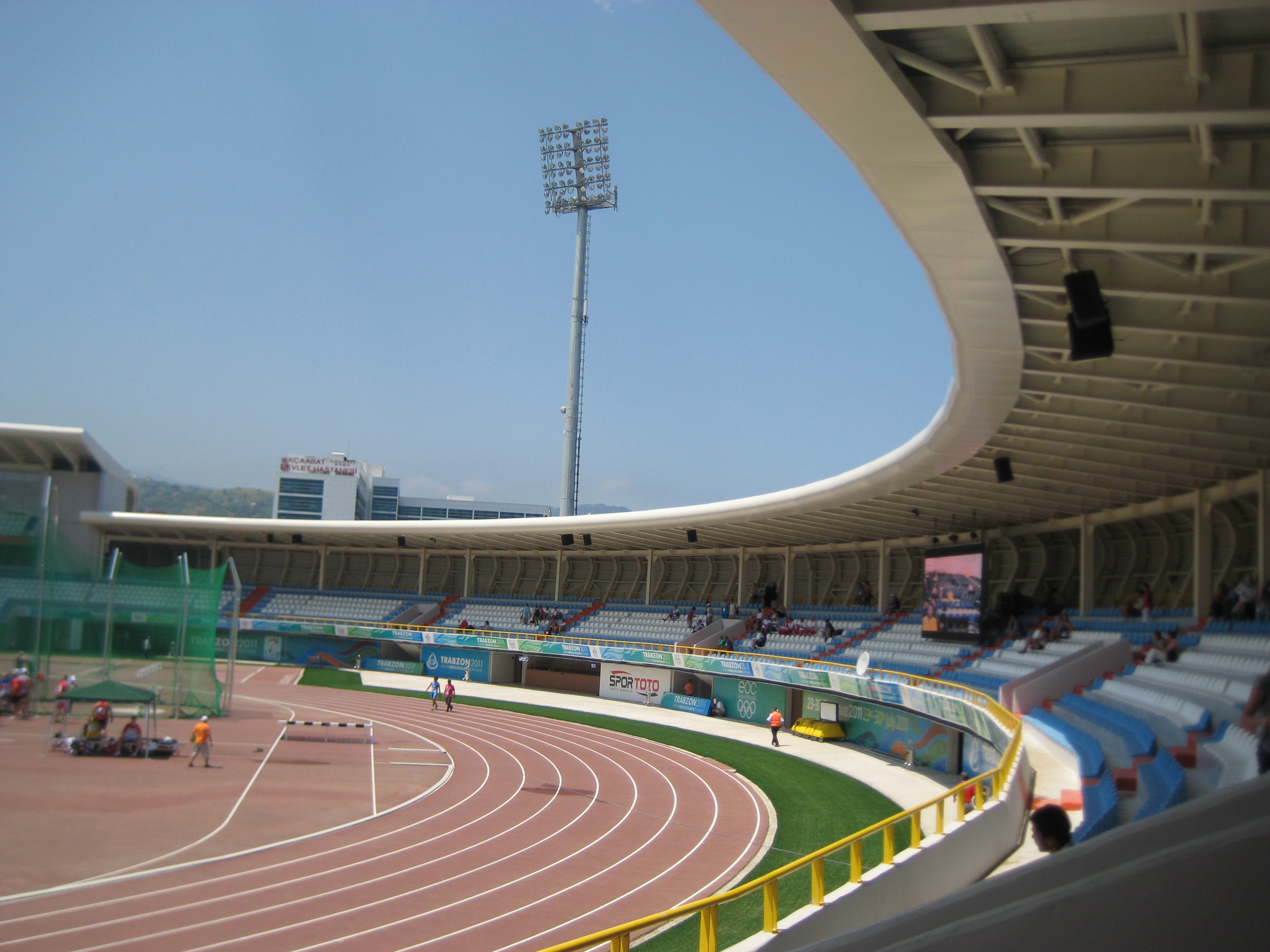
- Interactive map of Söğütlü Athletics Stadium
- Full name: Söğütlü Atletizm Sahası
- Location: Söğütlü, Akçaabat, Trabzon Province, Turkey
- Coordinates: 41.01650°N 39.59732°E
- Capacity: 7,200
- Surface: grass

Construction
- Built: 2007
- Opened: 2007
- Renovated: 2011

Tenants
- 2007 Black Sea Games; 2011 European Youth Summer Olympic Festival

Söğütlü Athletics Stadium (Turkish: Söğütlü Atletizm Sahası) is a sports venue for athletics competitions in track and field located in Trabzon, Turkey.

It was built 2007 at Söğütlü neighborhood of Akçaabat town in Trabzon Province as a stadium with movable seating to host the 1st Black Sea Games. In 2011, the venue's stands were replaced by concrete ones with a seating capacity of 7,200, and floodlights were installed for the 2011 European Youth Summer Olympic Festival. It is situated 2 km (1.2 mi) east of Akçaabat and 11 km (6.8 mi) west of Trabzon at the Black Sea coastal highway D.010.

The stadium has two eight-lane tracks, one for warm-up activities. There are also two training halls, a fitness center and rooms for health care, doping test and press.
