= Beşirli Tennis Courts =

Tennis venue in Trabzon, Turkey

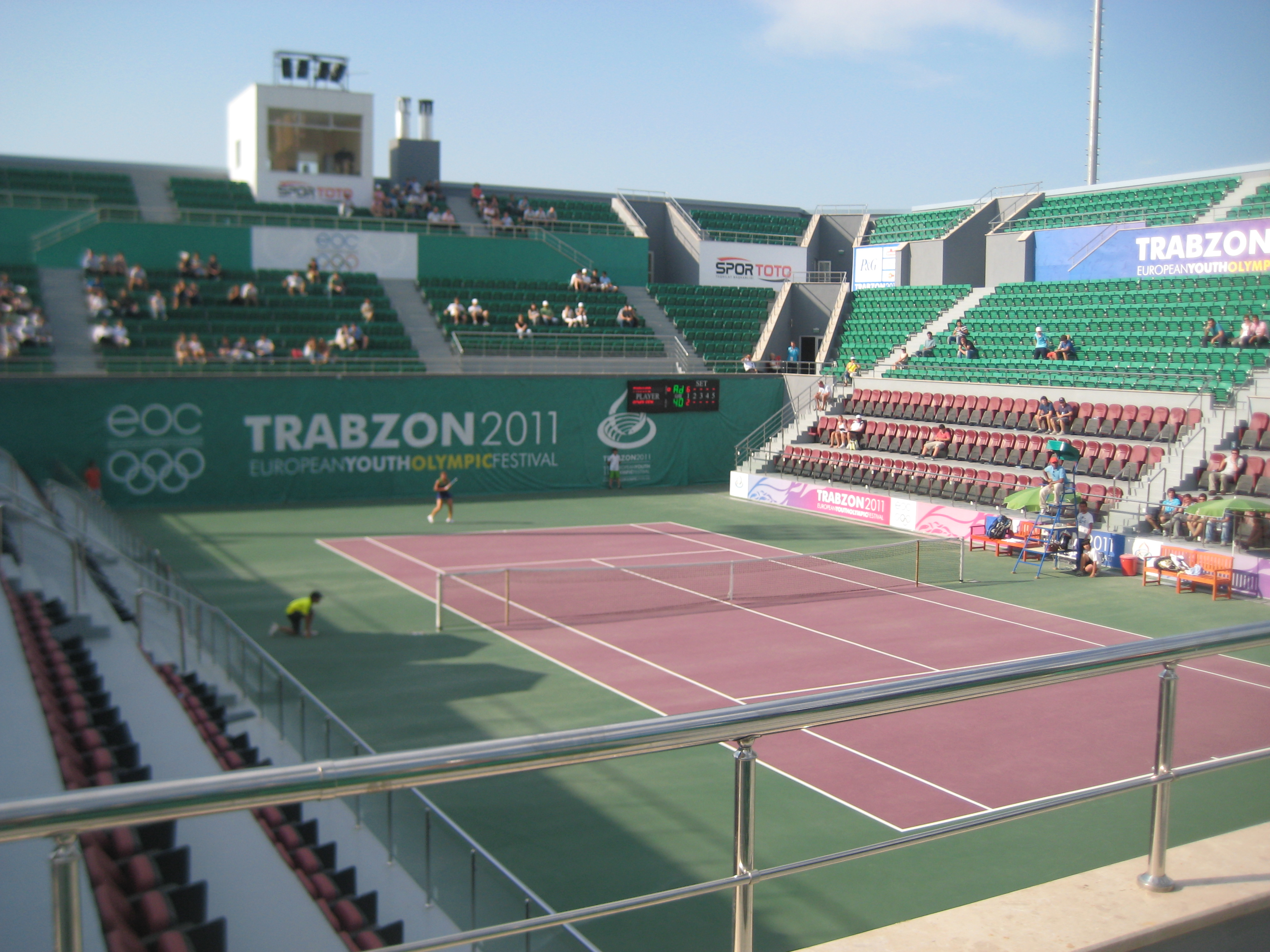
- Interactive map of Beşirli Tennis Courts
- Full name: Beşirli Tenis Kortları
- Location: Trabzon, Turkey
- Coordinates: 40°59′50.9″N 39°40′22.7″E
- Capacity: 4,500 (center court)
- Scoreboard: yes

Construction
- Built: 2011
- Cost: ₺ 20 million (approx. US$ 12.5 million)

Tenant
- 2011 European Youth Summer Olympic Festival

Beşirli Tennis Courts (Turkish: Beşirli Tenis Kortları), also known as Beşirli Tennis Complex, is a tennis venue located in Trabzon, Turkey.

Completed in 2011 at a cost of ₺ 20 million (approx. US$12.5 million), the complex consists of a center court with 4,500 seating capacity, three indoor courts, twelve outdoor courts and a children's court. There are also social and leisure facilities in addition to rooms for health care, doping test and press. The complex is the biggest of its kind in Turkey.

The Beşirli Courts hosted the tennis events during the 2011 European Youth Summer Olympic Festival.
