= Hayri Gür Arena =

Sports hall in Trabzon, Turkey

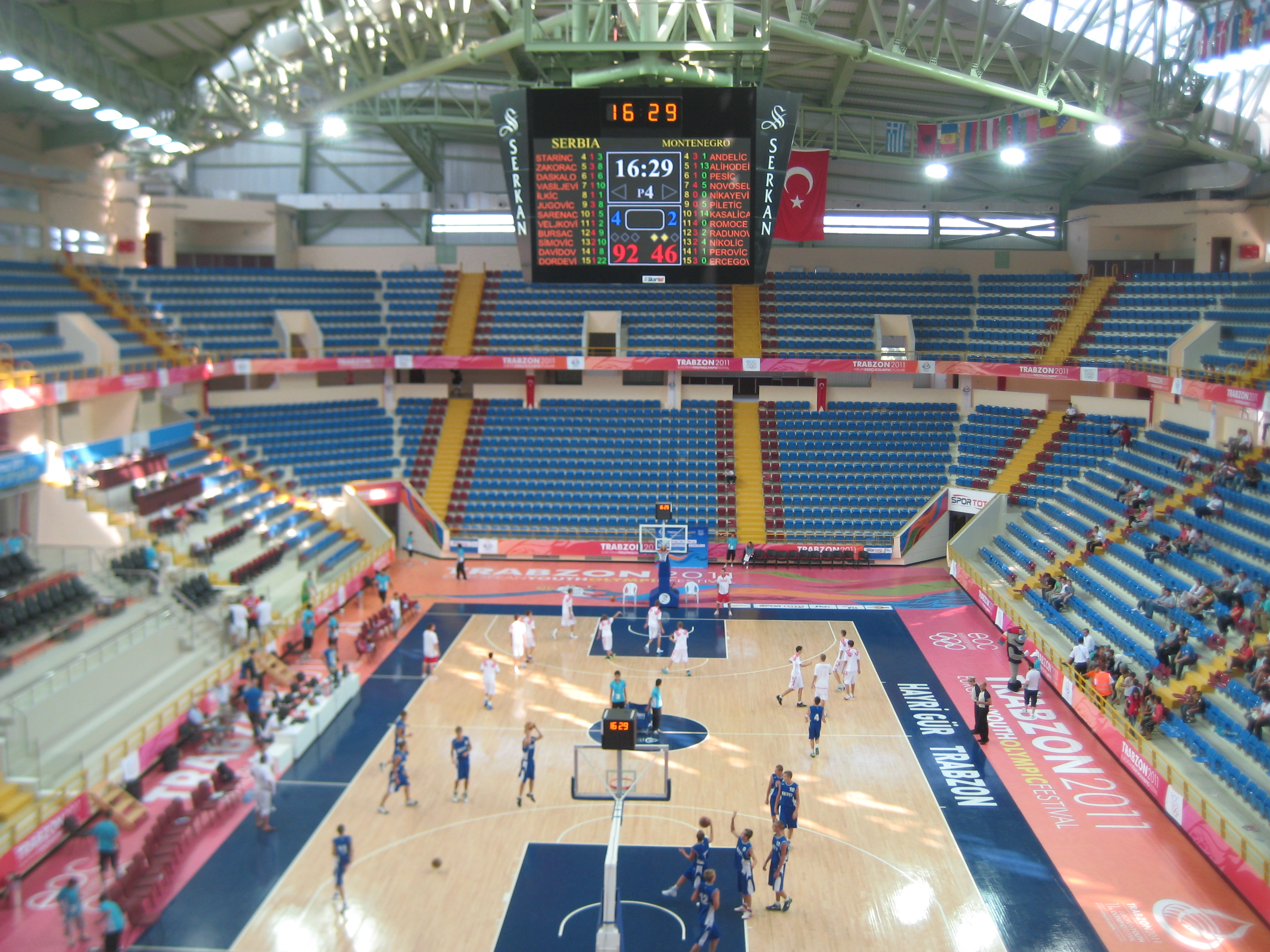
- Interactive map of Hayri Gür Arena
- Full name: Hayri Gür Spor Salonu
- Location: Pelitli, Trabzon, Turkey
- Coordinates: 40°59′11.6″N 39°48′19.0″E
- Owner: Trabzon Municipality
- Capacity: 7,500
- Surface: Wood flooring
- Scoreboard: yes

Construction
- Built: 2009-2010
- Opened: 9 May 2011; 15 years ago
- Cost: ₺23 million $14 million €8 million

Tenant
- Trabzonspor Basketball

Hayri Gür Arena (Turkish: Hayri Gür Spor Salonu), a.k.a. Pelitli Arena is an indoor sporting arena and multi-purpose venue located in the suburban town of Pelitli, Trabzon Province, Turkey.

== Construction ==
Built between 2009 and 2010 at a cost of ₺ 23 million (approx. $ 14 million), the venue was initially designed for a seating capacity of 5,000, however, it was later extended to hold 7,500 spectators. The building has two training halls, rooms for health care, doping test and press. In addition, there are social and leisure facilities. The arena's parking lot can hold 456 cars.

== History ==
In the beginning, it was called Pelitli Arena from the location of the venue. Later, the arena was renamed Hayri Gür to honor Trabzonspor's first coach and long-time board member, who died in 2010, aged 98.

== Events ==
The venue is home to the basketball team of Trabzonspor Basketball. It hosted the basketball matches for boys during the 2011 European Youth Summer Olympic Festival.

== See also ==
- List of indoor arenas in Turkey
