= Handball at the 2011 European Youth Summer Olympic Festival =

Handball contests at the 2011 European Youth Summer Olympic Festival were held from July 25, 2011 to July 29, 2011. Competitions for boys were played at the Çarşıbaşı Arena and for the girls at the Vakfıkebir Arena in Trabzon, Turkey. Eight nations each for boys and girls took part at the event.

== Medal summary ==
=== Medal table ===
Rank	Nation	Gold	Silver	Bronze	Total
1	Denmark	1	0	1	2
2	Russia	1	0	0	1
3	Germany	0	1	0	1
3	Sweden	0	1	0	1
5	Serbia	0	0	1	1
Totals (5 entries)		2	2	2	6

=== Medalist events ===
Event	Gold	Silver	Bronze
Boys	Denmark	Germany	Serbia
Girls	Russia	Sweden	Denmark

== Boys ==
=== Group round ===
==== Group A ====
#	Team	MP	W	D	L	GF	GA	GD	Pts
1	France	3	3	0	0	76	48	+8	6
2	Germany	3	2	0	1	80	74	+6	4
3	Croatia	3	1	0	2	69	75	−6	2
4	Switzerland	3	0	0	3	78	86	−8	0

2011–07–25, Çarşıbaşı Arena
France	27–26	Switzerland
Croatia	20–28	Germany
2011–07–26, Çarşıbaşı Arena
France	28–22	Germany
Switzerland	26–29	Croatia
2011–07–27, Çarşıbaşı Arena
France	21–20	Croatia
Germany	30–26	Switzerland

==== Group B ====
#	Team	MP	W	L	SW	SL	PS	PL	Pts
1	Serbia	3	3	0	0	117	84	+33	6
2	Denmark	3	2	0	1	99	73	+26	4
3	Spain	3	1	0	2	79	89	−10	2
4	Turkey	3	0	0	3	70	119	−49	0

2011–07–25, Çarşıbaşı Arena
Spain	29–35	Serbia
Denmark	44–16	Turkey
2011–07–26, Çarşıbaşı Arena
Spain	33–23	Turkey
Serbia	40–24	Denmark
2011–07–27, Çarşıbaşı Arena
Spain	17–31	Denmark
Turkey	31–42	Serbia

=== Final round ===
Semifinal 1–4
July 28–Trabzon
France	23
Denmark	24
July 28–Trabzon
Germany	36
Serbia	33

Gold medal match
July 29–Trabzon
Denmark	28
Germany	26
Bronze medal match
July 29–Trabzon
France	28
Serbia	31

Semifinal 5–8
July 28–Trabzon
Switzerland	29
Spain	36
July 28–Trabzon
Croatia	30
Turkey	13

Fifth place match
July 29–Trabzon
Spain	28
Croatia	24
Seventh place match
July 29–Trabzon
Switzerland	26
Turkey	27

== Girls ==
=== Group round ===
==== Group A ====
#	Team	MP	W	D	L	GF	GA	GD	Pts
1	Netherlands	3	3	0	0	90	77	+13	6
2	Denmark	3	2	0	1	83	68	+15	4
3	Norway	3	1	0	2	78	85	−7	2
4	Austria	3	0	0	3	72	93	−21	0

2011–07–25, Çarşıbaşı Arena
Norway	18–28	Denmark
Netherlands	31–24	Austria
2011–07–26, Çarşıbaşı Arena
Norway	30–24	Austria
Denmark	23–26	Netherlands
2011–07–27, Çarşıbaşı Arena
Norway	30–33	Netherlands
Austria	24–32	Denmark

==== Group B ====
#	Team	MP	W	L	SW	SL	PS	PL	Pts
1	Russia	3	3	0	0	110	64	+47	6
2	Sweden	3	2	0	1	78	82	−4	4
3	Poland	3	1	0	2	68	86	−18	2
4	Turkey	3	0	0	3	69	94	−25	0

2011–07–25, Vakfıkebir Arena
Sweden	30–24	Turkey
Russia	35–21	Poland
2011–07–26, Vakfıkebir Arena
Sweden	28–21	Poland
Turkey	22–38	Russia
2011–07–27, Vakfıkebir Arena
Sweden	20–37	Russia
Poland	26–23	Turkey

=== Final round ===
Semifinal 1–4
July 28–Trabzon
Netherlands	22
Sweden	31
July 28–Trabzon
Denmark	20
Russia	38

Gold medal match
July 29–Trabzon
Sweden	20
Russia	38
Bronze medal match
July 29–Trabzon
Netherlands	22
Denmark	26

Semifinal 5–8
July 28–Trabzon
Austria	21
Poland	38
July 28–Trabzon
Norway	30
Turkey	27

Fifth place match
July 29–Trabzon
Poland	31
Norway	25
Seventh place match
July 29–Trabzon
Austria	26
Turkey	35
