= Konstantinos Theofylaktos =

Turkish mayor

Personal details
- Born: Trapezunta
- Spouse: Eleni
- Children: Adam
- Occupation: Banker & Merchant

Konstantinos Theofylaktos (Greek: Κωνσταντίνος Θεοφύλακτος, born in Trapezunta), was a banker and mayor of Trabzon, Turkey from 1916 until 1918. He owned one of the five banks in the town. He was the owner of Kostaki Mansion built between 1889–1913 as a large family accommodation, which is reorganised as the Trabzon Museum.
