= Arsin Arena =

Indoor volleyball venue in Arsin, Trabzon, Turkey

- Interactive map of Arsin Arena
- Full name: Arsin Spor Salonu
- Location: Arsin, Trabzon, Turkey
- Coordinates: 40°57′00.6″N 39°55′52.5″E
- Capacity: 500
- Surface: Wood flooring
- Scoreboard: yes

Construction
- Built: 2010

Tenant
- 2011 European Youth Summer Olympic Festival

Arsin Arena (Turkish: Arsin Spor Salonu) is an indoor volleyball venue located in Arsin town of Trabzon Province, Turkey. Built in 2010, the arena has a capacity of 500 spectators.

Volleyball matches for girls were played at this arena during the 2011 European Youth Summer Olympic Festival.
