= 2011 European Youth Summer Olympic Festival =

2011 European Youth Olympic Festival
- Host city: Trabzon
- Country: Turkey
- Nations: 49
- Athletes: 3,138
- Sport: 9
- Events: 109
- Opening: 23 July 2011
- Closing: 29 July 2011
- Opened by: Recep Tayyip Erdoğan
- Main venue: Hüseyin Avni Aker Stadium

Summer

Winter

The 2011 European Youth Summer Olympic Festival was held in Trabzon, Turkey, between 23 and 29 July 2011.

== Sports ==
There were nine sports at the 2011 Festival, two branches, table tennis and water polo, less than compared with the 2007 Youth Olympic Festival's programme. Medals were awarded in a total of 109 events.

2011 European Youth Summer Olympic Festival Sports Programme
- Athletics (36)
- Basketball (2)
- Cycling (3)
- Gymnastics (14)
- Handball (2)
- Judo (15)
- Swimming (31)
- Tennis (4)
- Volleyball (2)

== Venues ==
For the 2011 European Youth Summer Olympic Festival's eight events except cycling, eleven sports venues were needed in and around Trabzon. Existing sport halls were renovated and new arenas were built for this purpose with a total investment cost mounting up to TL 350 million (approx. US$210 million), inclusive the construction of additional accommodation facilities at a cost of TL 90 million (approx. US$54 million) for the Olympic Village within the campus of the Black Sea Technical University. The noteworthy new structures are Hayri Gür Arena, Söğütlü Athletics Stadium, Mehmet Akif Ersoy Indoor Swimming Pool and Beşirli Tennis Courts. Cycling events were held on the Trabzon-Rize section of the Black Sea Coastal Highway.

Venue	Location	Sports
19 Mayıs Arena	Trabzon	Basketball
Araklı Arena	Trabzon	Volleyball
Arsin Arena	Trabzon	Volleyball
Beşirli Tennis Courts	Trabzon	Tennis
Çarşıbaşı Arena	Trabzon	Handball
Mehmet Akif Ersoy Indoor Swimming Pool	Trabzon	Swimming
Of Arena	Trabzon	Judo
Hayri Gür Arena	Trabzon	Basketball
Söğütlü Athletics Stadium	Trabzon	Athletics
Trabzon-Rize Highway	Trabzon	Cycling
Vakfıkebir Arena	Trabzon	Handball
Yomra Arena	Trabzon	Gymnastics

== Nations ==
Participating National Olympic Committees
- Albania
- Andorra
- Armenia
- Austria
- Azerbaijan
- Belarus
- Belgium (82)
- Bosnia and Herzegovina
- Bulgaria
- Croatia
- Cyprus
- Czech Republic
- Denmark
- Estonia (44)
- Finland
- France
- Georgia
- Germany
- Great Britain
- Greece
- Hungary
- Iceland
- Ireland
- Israel
- Italy
- Latvia
- Liechtenstein
- Lithuania (51)
- Luxembourg
- Malta
- Moldova
- Monaco
- Montenegro
- Netherlands
- Norway
- Poland
- Portugal
- Romania
- Russia
- San Marino
- Serbia
- Slovakia
- Slovenia
- Spain
- Sweden
- Switzerland
- Turkey
- Ukraine

== Calendar ==
OC	Opening ceremony	●	Event competitions	1	Event finals	CC	Closing ceremony

July 2011	24th Sun	25th Mon	26th Tue	27th Wed	28th Thu	29th Fri	Gold Medals
Ceremonies	OC					CC	
Athletics		2	9	5	10	10	36
Basketball		●	●	●	●	2	2
Cycling			1	1	1		3
Gymnastics		●	●	●	●	14	14
Handball		●	●	●	●	2	2
Judo			4	4	4	3	15
Swimming		8	7		8	8	31
Tennis		●	●	●	●	4	4
Volleyball		●	●	●	●	2	2
Total Gold Medals		10	21	10	23	45	109
Cumulative Total		10	31	41	64	109	

== Medal table ==
* Host nation (Turkey)

Rank	Nation	Gold	Silver	Bronze	Total
1	Russia	21	17	16	54
2	Great Britain	17	10	6	33
3	Ukraine	8	4	3	15
4	Italy	7	12	12	31
5	Romania	6	7	1	14
6	Hungary	5	3	5	13
7	Germany	4	12	8	24
8	France	4	7	5	16
9	Belarus	4	1	4	9
10	Lithuania	3	4	3	10
11	Slovenia	3	3	3	9
12	Spain	3	0	2	5
13	Belgium	2	5	8	15
14	Czech Republic	2	2	5	9
15	Switzerland	2	2	2	6
16	Netherlands	2	1	6	9
17	Poland	2	1	5	8
18	Ireland	2	1	4	7
19	Sweden	2	1	0	3
20	Turkey*	2	0	7	9
21	Denmark	2	0	3	5
22	Latvia	1	3	1	5
23	Azerbaijan	1	2	0	3
24	Georgia	1	1	4	6
25	Croatia	1	1	2	4
26	Greece	1	1	0	2
27	Israel	1	0	1	2
28	Serbia	0	3	2	5
29	Finland	0	2	1	3
30	Austria	0	1	1	2
30	Cyprus	0	1	1	2
32	Bulgaria	0	1	0	1
33	Armenia	0	0	1	1
33	Bosnia and Herzegovina	0	0	1	1
33	Slovakia	0	0	1	1
Totals (35 entries)		109	109	124	342
