= Of Arena =

Indoor sporting venue in Trabzon, Turkey

- Interactive map of Of Arena
- Full name: Of Spor Salonu
- Location: Of, Trabzon, Turkey
- Coordinates: 40°55′49.0″N 40°16′35.9″E
- Capacity: 1,000
- Surface: Wood flooring
- Scoreboard: yes

Tenant
- 2011 European Youth Summer Olympic Festival

Of Arena (Turkish: Of Spor Salonu) is an indoor multi-purpose sports venue located in Of town of Trabzon Province, Turkey. The arena has a capacity of 1,000 spectators.

It hosted the judo events during the 2011 European Youth Summer Olympic Festival.
