= Judo at the 2011 European Youth Summer Olympic Festival =

Judo competition

Judo Judo at the 2011 European Youth Summer Olympic Festival
- Venue: Of Arena
- Location: Trabzon, Turkey
- Dates: 26–29 July 2011

Competition at external databases
- Links: EJU • JudoInside

The Judo at the 2011 European Youth Summer Olympic Festival contests were held from 26 to 29 July 2011. The competitions took place at the Of Arena in Trabzon, Turkey. Boys and girls born 1995/1996 or later participated at following 8 disciplines for boys and 7 for girls.

== Results ==
=== Boys ===
| Event | Gold | Silver | Bronze |
|---|---|---|---|
| –50 kg | Walide Khyar (FRA) | Elios Manzi (ITA) | Vahagn Hovsepyan (ARM); Karim Maekelberg (BEL) |
| –55 kg | Dzmitry Minkou (BLR) | Samuel Hall (GBR) | Pavlo Skopnenko (UKR); Nico Spindler (AUT) |
| –60 kg Extra-lightweight | Alexander Raskopine (ISR) | Adrian Gomboc (SLO) | Oleg Sanin (RUS); Tamazi Kirakozashvili (GEO) |
| –66 kg Half-lightweight | Uruskhan Bek Balaev (RUS) | Huseyn Rahimli (AZE) | Giorgi Muzashvili (GEO); Murat Bektas (TUR) |
| –73 kg Lightweight | Firudin Dadashov (AZE) | Temurbek Nuraliev (RUS) | Levan Gugava (GEO); Kenzo Breda (BEL) |
| –81 kg Half-middleweight | Beka Gviniashvili (GEO) | Arturs Sokolovskis (LAT) | Ivan Zoran Grubic (CRO); Aleksandr Petrunia (RUS) |
| –90 kg Middleweight | Anton Savytskiy (UKR) | Jalil Shukurov (AZE) | Glebs Talalujevs (LAT); Akhmed Magomedov (RUS) |
| +90 kg | Sergii Zvieriev (UKR) | Matej Grubisa (CRO) | Vladimir Molodykh (RUS); Giorgi Lazuashvili (GEO) |

=== Girls ===
| Event | Gold | Silver | Bronze |
|---|---|---|---|
| –44 kg | Irina Dolgova (RUS) | Borislava Emilova Damyankova (BUL) | Evi Vermandere (BEL); Hayley Willis (GBR) |
| –48 kg Extra-lightweight | Anja Stangar (SLO) | Natalia Golomidova (RUS) | Demi Van Schijndel (NED); Marie Holcakova (CZE) |
| –52 kg Half-lightweight | Alexandra Larisa Florian (ROU) | Zarina Babinyan (RUS) | Katja Carolin Stiebeling (GER); Daniela Raia (ITA) |
| –57 kg Lightweight | Kevser Cevik (TUR) | Stefania Adelina Dobre (ROU) | Vivien Koteles (HUN); Do Velema (NED) |
| –63 kg Half-middleweight | Diana Dzhigaros (RUS) | Krisztina Polyak (HUN) | Bar Farin (ISR); Patricija Brolih (SLO) |
| –70 kg Middleweight | Brigita Matic (CRO) | Aja Gacnik Zupanc (SLO) | Sanne Van Dijke (NED); Beata Anna Pacut (POL) |
| +70 kg | Yelyzaveta Kalanina (UKR) | Vera Davydenko (RUS) | Kübra Kara (TUR); Michelle Goschin (GER) |
