= Çarşıbaşı Arena =

Indoor handball venue in Çarşıbaşı, Trabzon, Turkey

- Interactive map of Çarşıbaşı Arena
- Full name: Çarşıbaşı Spor Salonu
- Location: Çarşıbaşı, Trabzon, Turkey
- Coordinates: 41°04′49.9″N 39°23′00.5″E
- Capacity: 500
- Surface: Wood flooring
- Scoreboard: yes

Tenant
- 2011 European Youth Summer Olympic Festival

Çarşıbaşı Arena (Turkish: Çarşıbaşı Spor Salonu) is an indoor handball venue located in Çarşıbaşı town of Trabzon Province, Turkey. The arena has a capacity of 500 spectators.

The arena hosted the handball event for boys during the 2011 European Youth Summer Olympic Festival.
