= Trabzon Museum =

- Trabzon Müzesi
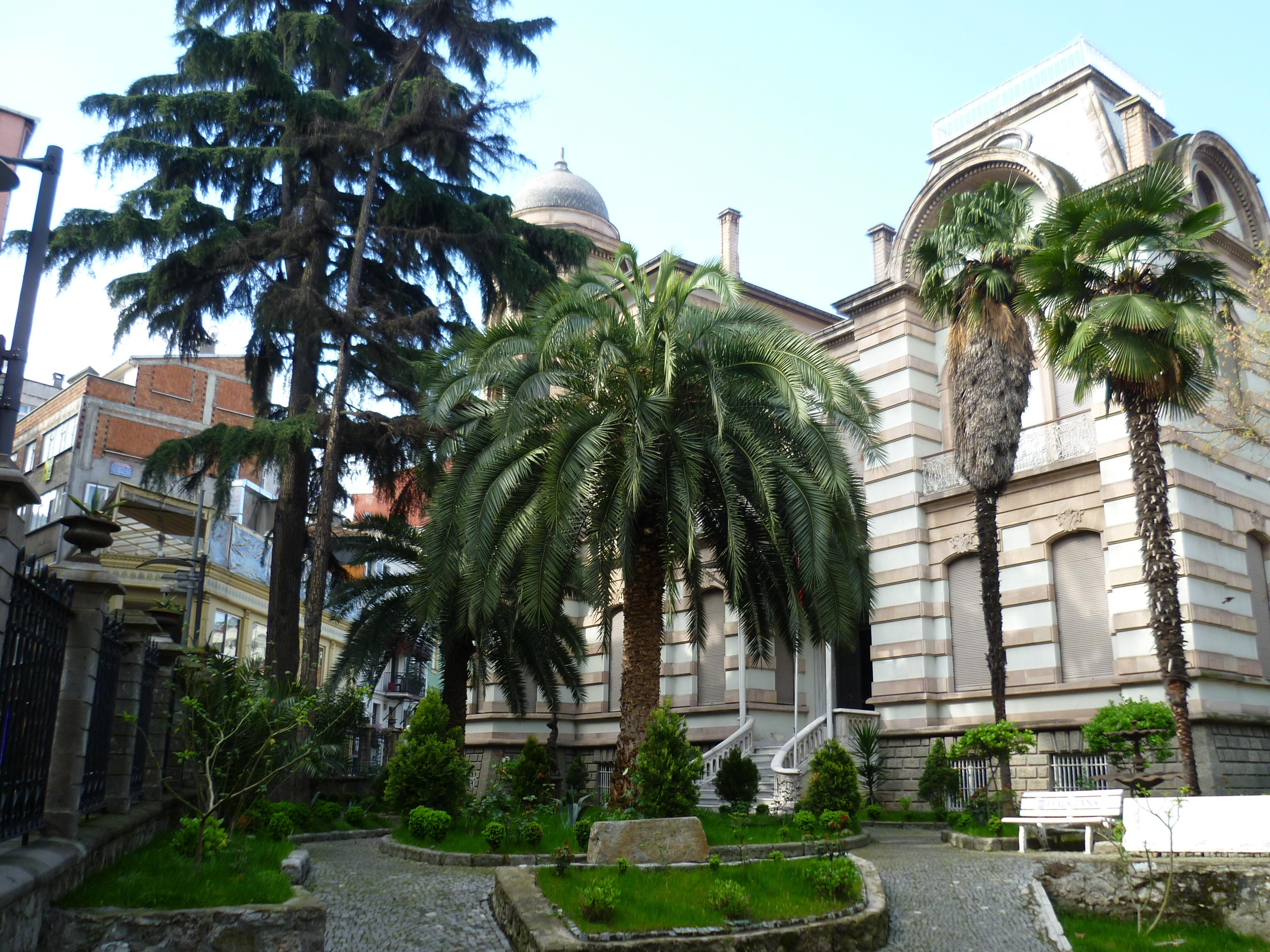

- Location of Trabzon Museum
- Established: April 22, 2001
- Location: Trabzon, Turkey
- Coordinates: 41.00505°N 39.72657°E
- Type: House museum, Archeological museum, Ethnographic museum
- Collection size: 3,651
- Website: www.trabzonmuseum

The Trabzon Museum (Turkish: Trabzon Müzesi), also known as Kostaki Mansion (Kostaki Konağı), is a historic house museum with archeological and ethnographic exhibitions located in Trabzon, Turkey.

== History ==
The mansion was built in the beginning of the 1900s as a private residence for Kostaki Teophylaktos, a notable banker of Greek origin. The architect of the mansion was Alexandros Kakoulidis, who was also the architect of the Greek College of Tebizond (Φροντιστήριον Τραπεζούντας), the Kapagiannidis villa, and other famous buildings in Trebizond.

Teophylaktos went bankrupt in 1917 and all his properties were confiscated, among them his mansion. The building was acquired by the Nemlioğlu family.

During the timespan of Turkish War of Independence (1919–1923), the mansion was used as the headquarters for the military in the region. In 1924, it was prepared for the first visit of Mustafa Kemal, the founder of the Turkish Republic, to Trabzon. Between September 15–17, he and the First Lady Latife stayed in the mansion.

In 1927, the building was nationalized by the Governor of Trabzon Ali Galip Bey, and served until 1931 as the Governor's House. Between 1931 and 1937, it was used as the inspector's office.

The Kostaki Mansion was assigned in 1937 to the Ministry of National Education, and was used for fifty years long as a vocational high school for girls. Finally, in 1987, the building was handed over to the Ministry of Culture and Tourism to be transformed into a museum.

== Museum ==
The building, one of the outstanding examples of the civil architecture in Turkey, was restored between 1988 and 2001. On April 22, 2001, it was opened to public as the Trabzon Museum. A total of 3,651 items are found in the museum's inventory.

The building is on three levels in addition to a basement. The basement comprises archeological works, while the first floor is the section for ethnographic collections. On the ground floor, items belonging to the architecture and history of the mansion are exhibited. The attic is reserved for the administration.

=== Archeological section ===
In this section, old coins and a wide range of items are exhibited, among them of marble, basalt, ceramic, metal and glass from Bronze Age (3300–1200 BCE), Classic period (480–323 BC), Hellenistic (323-146 BC), Roman and Byzantine periods.

=== About the Mansion ===
The ground floor is prepared to show the architecture of the building and history of the mansion in chronological order. The walls of all the rooms are decorated with near Baroque style hand carved ornamental works.

=== Ethnographic section ===
In this section, items are on display that are characteristic for the region. Also exhibited are Islamic works and items from the Ottoman period (1299-1923).

== Gallery ==
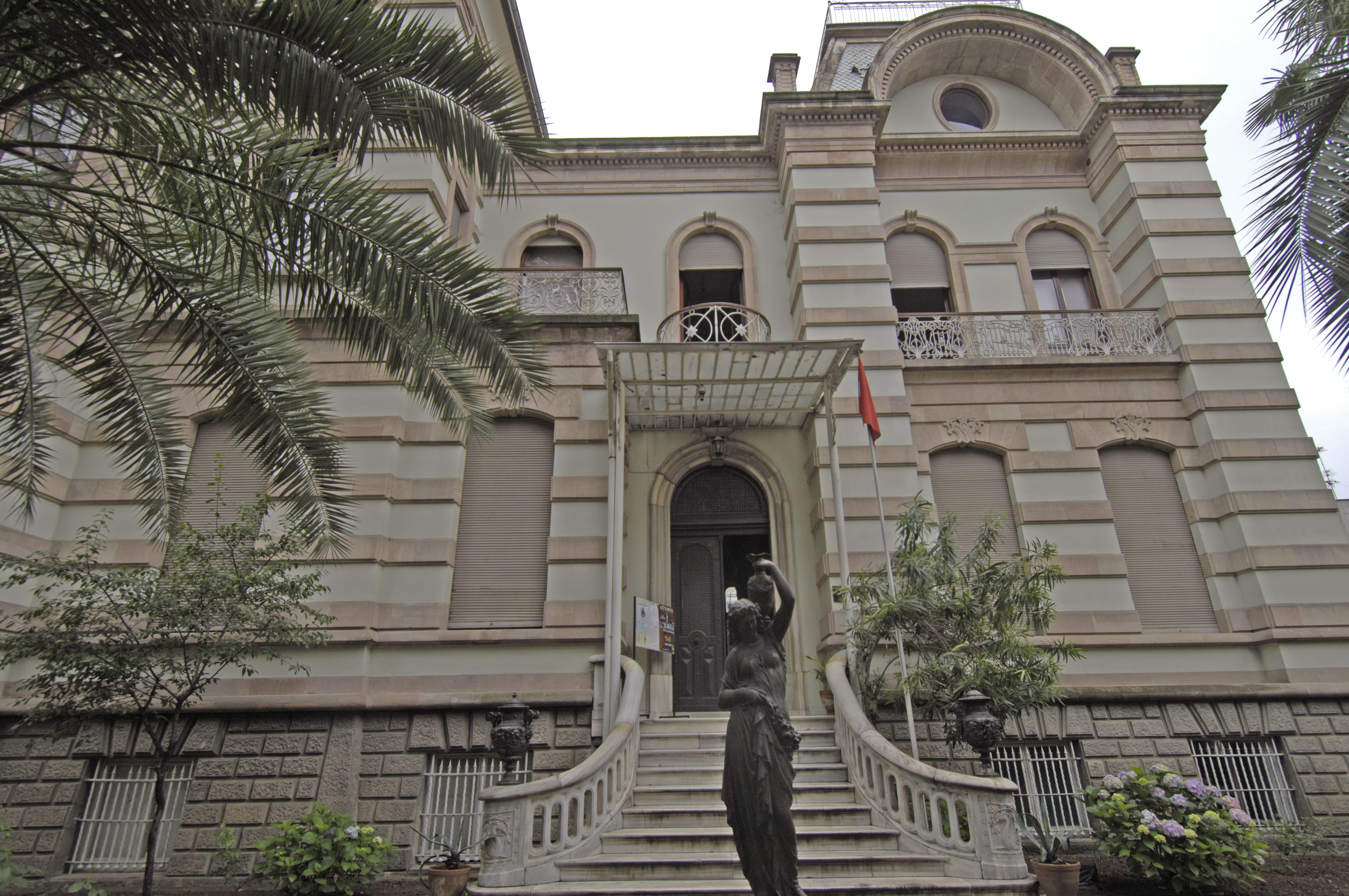
Trabzon Museum Front

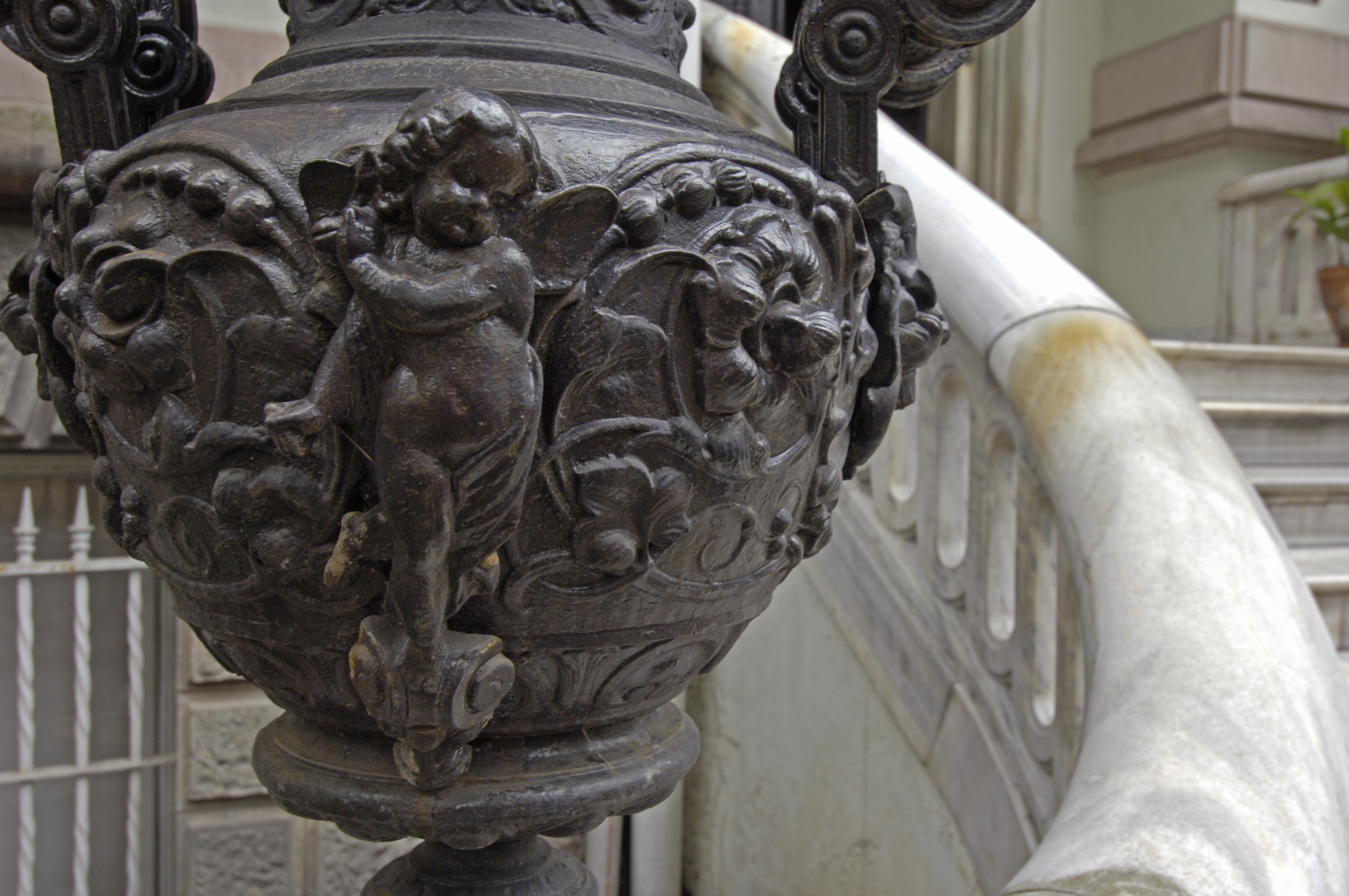
Trabzon Museum Front decoration of stairs

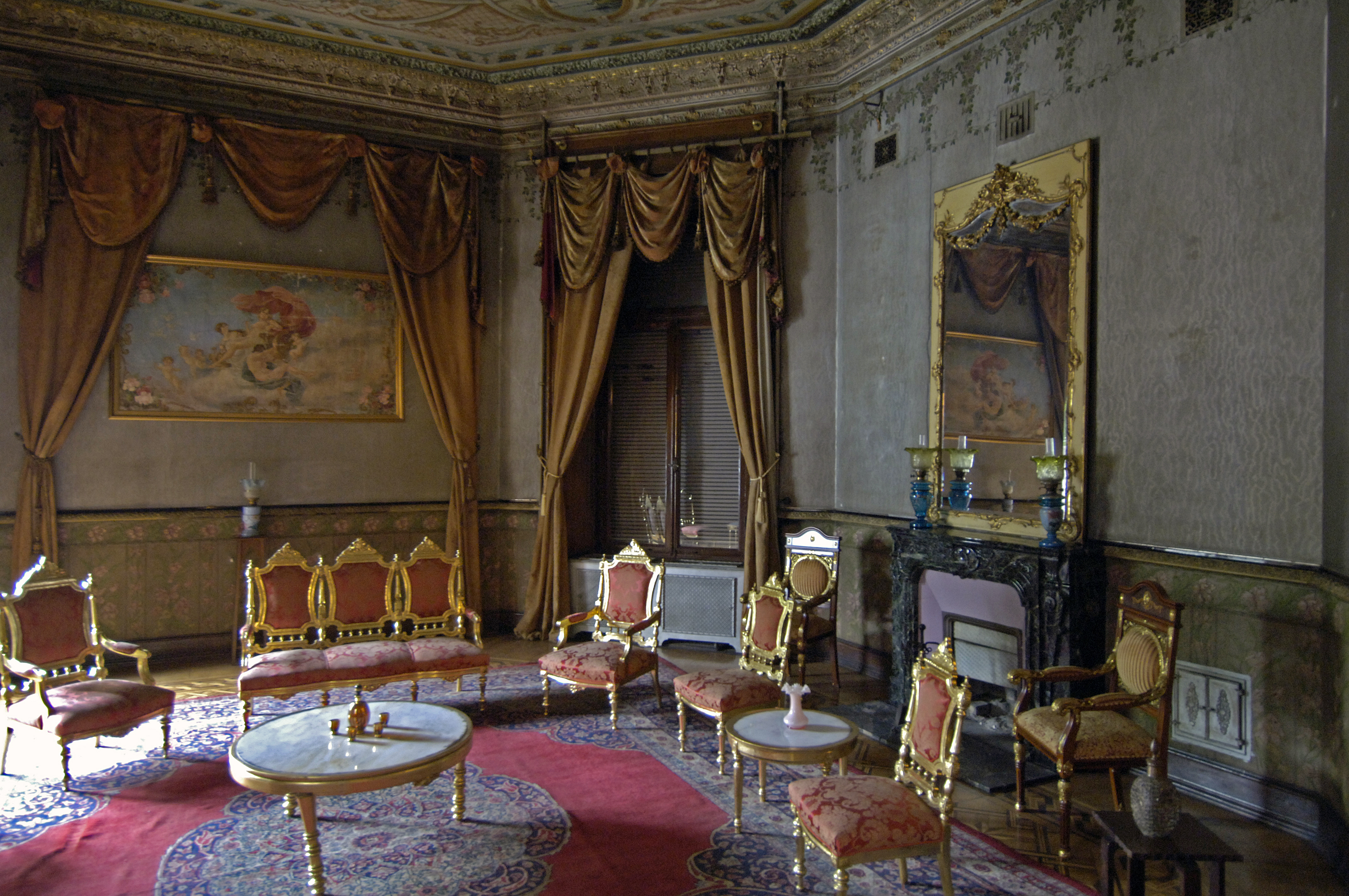
Trabzon Museum Salon

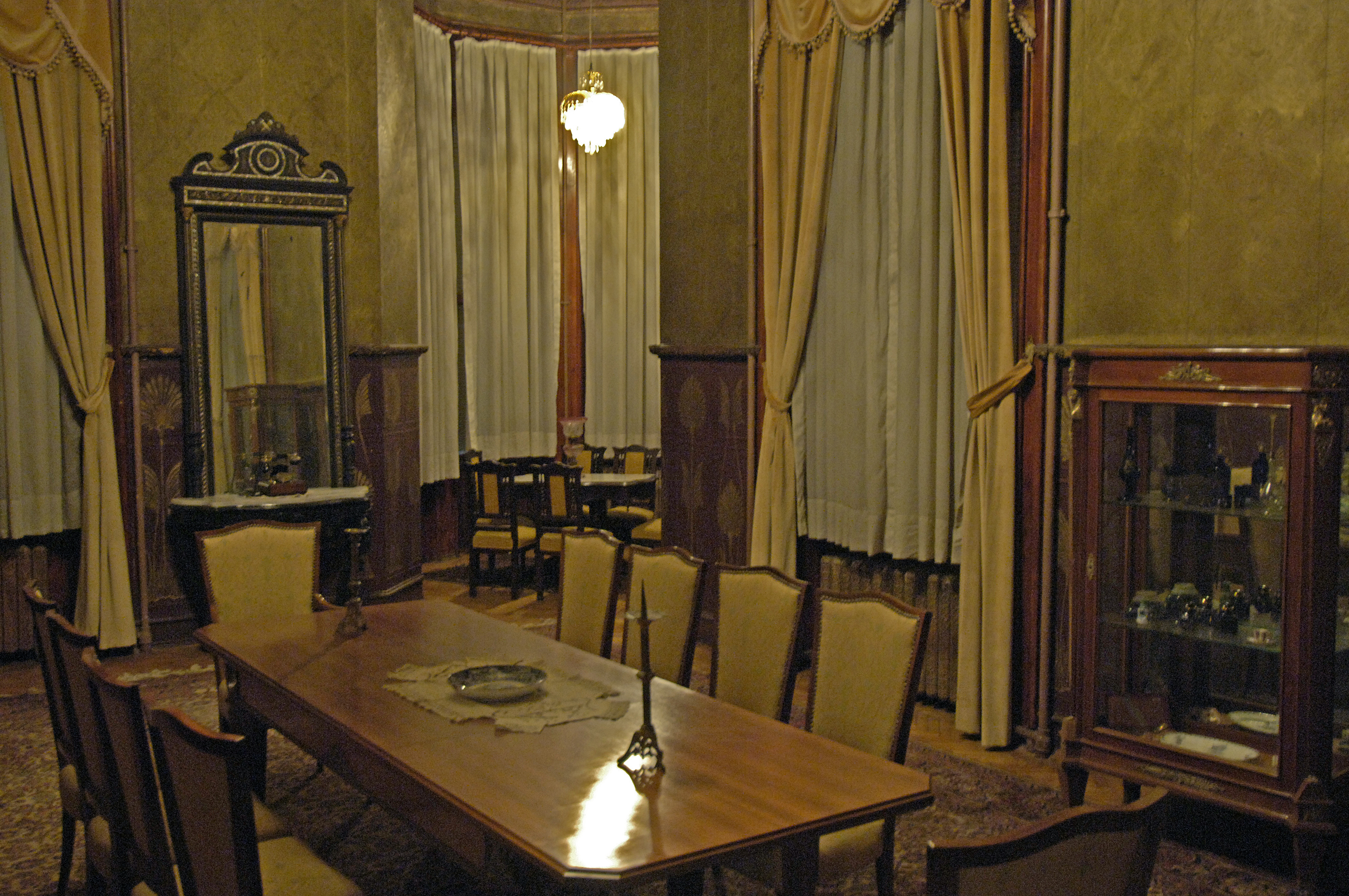
Trabzon Museum Dining room

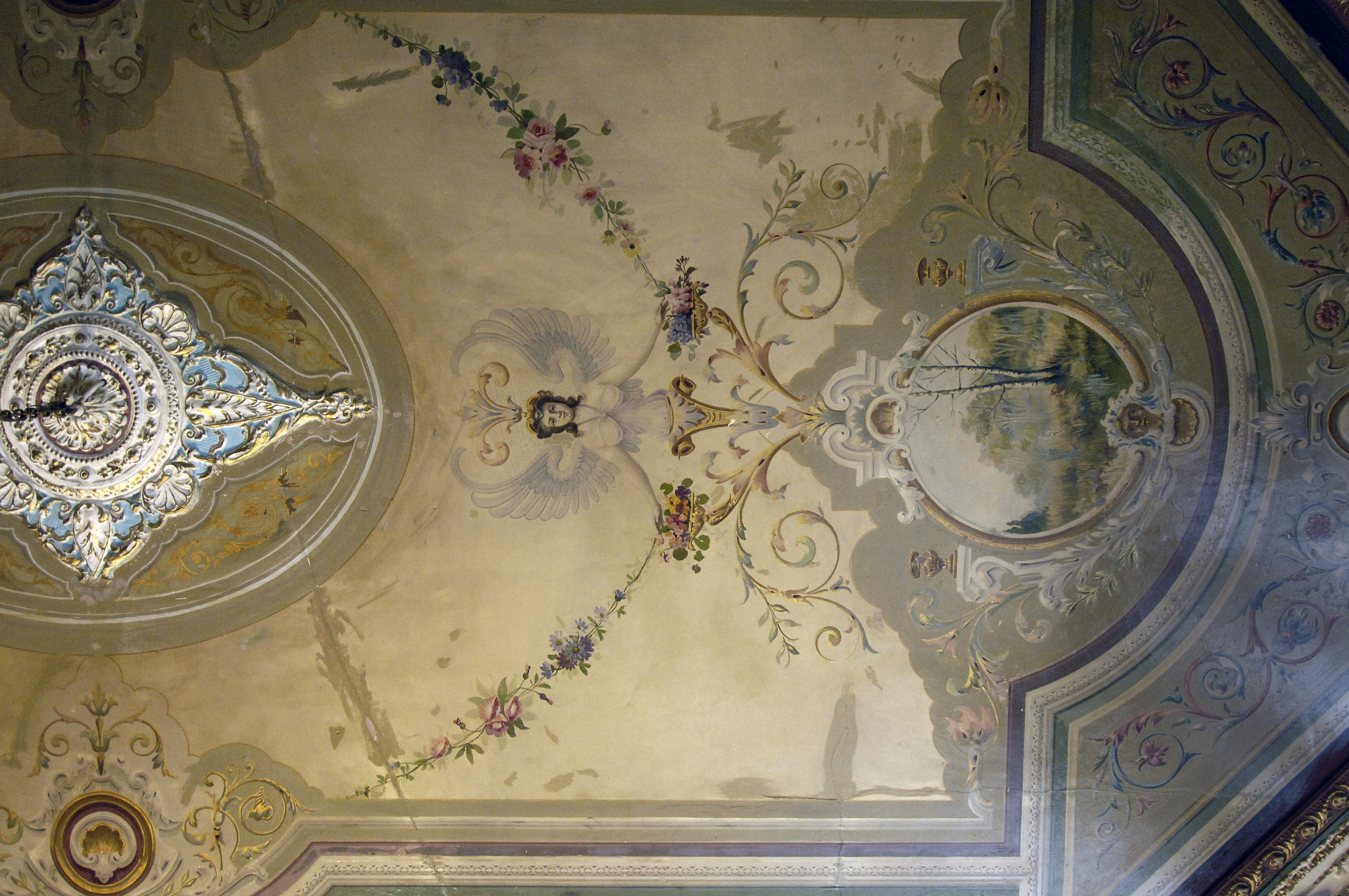
Trabzon Museum Ceiling

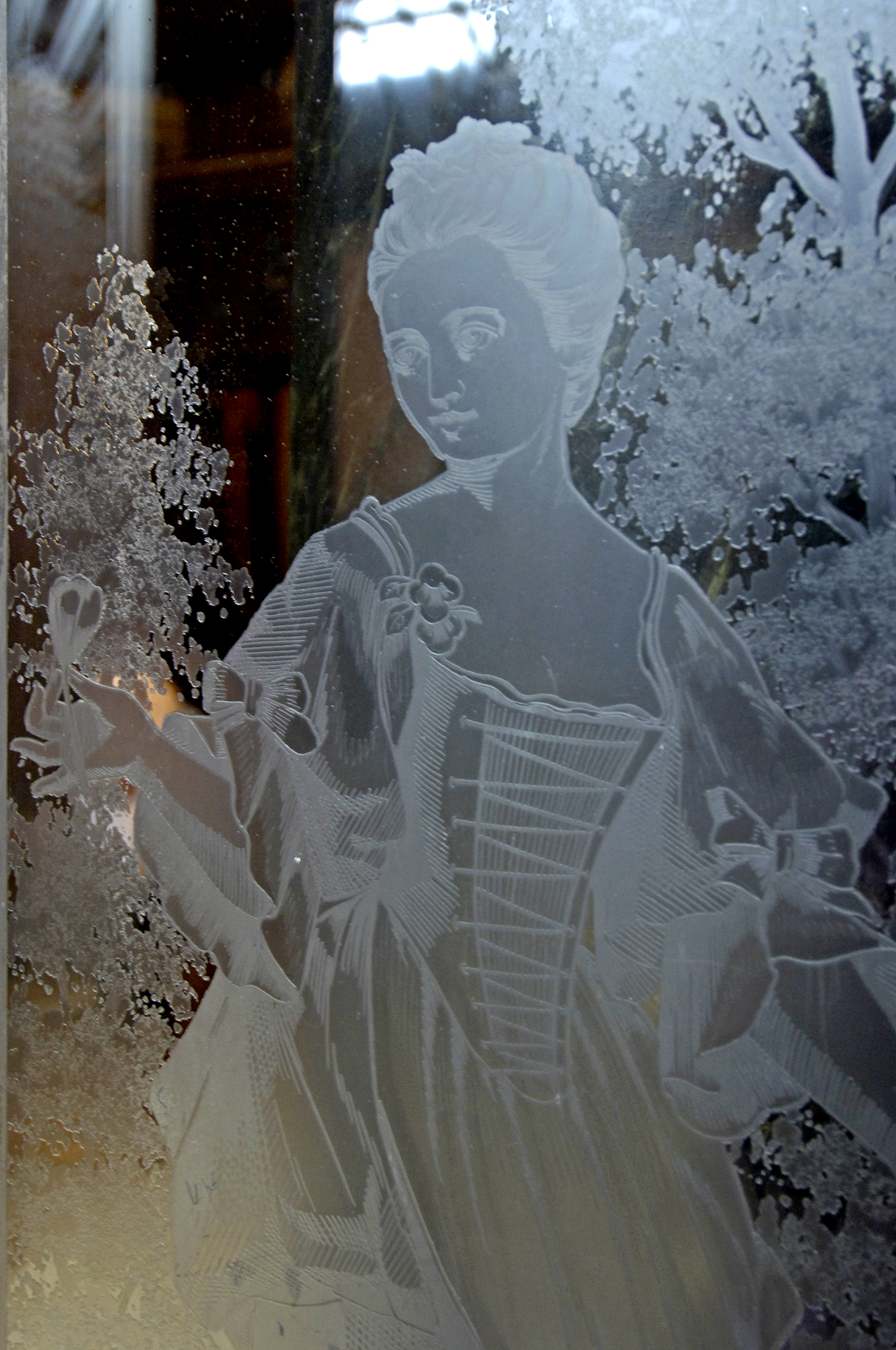
Trabzon Museum Glass panel

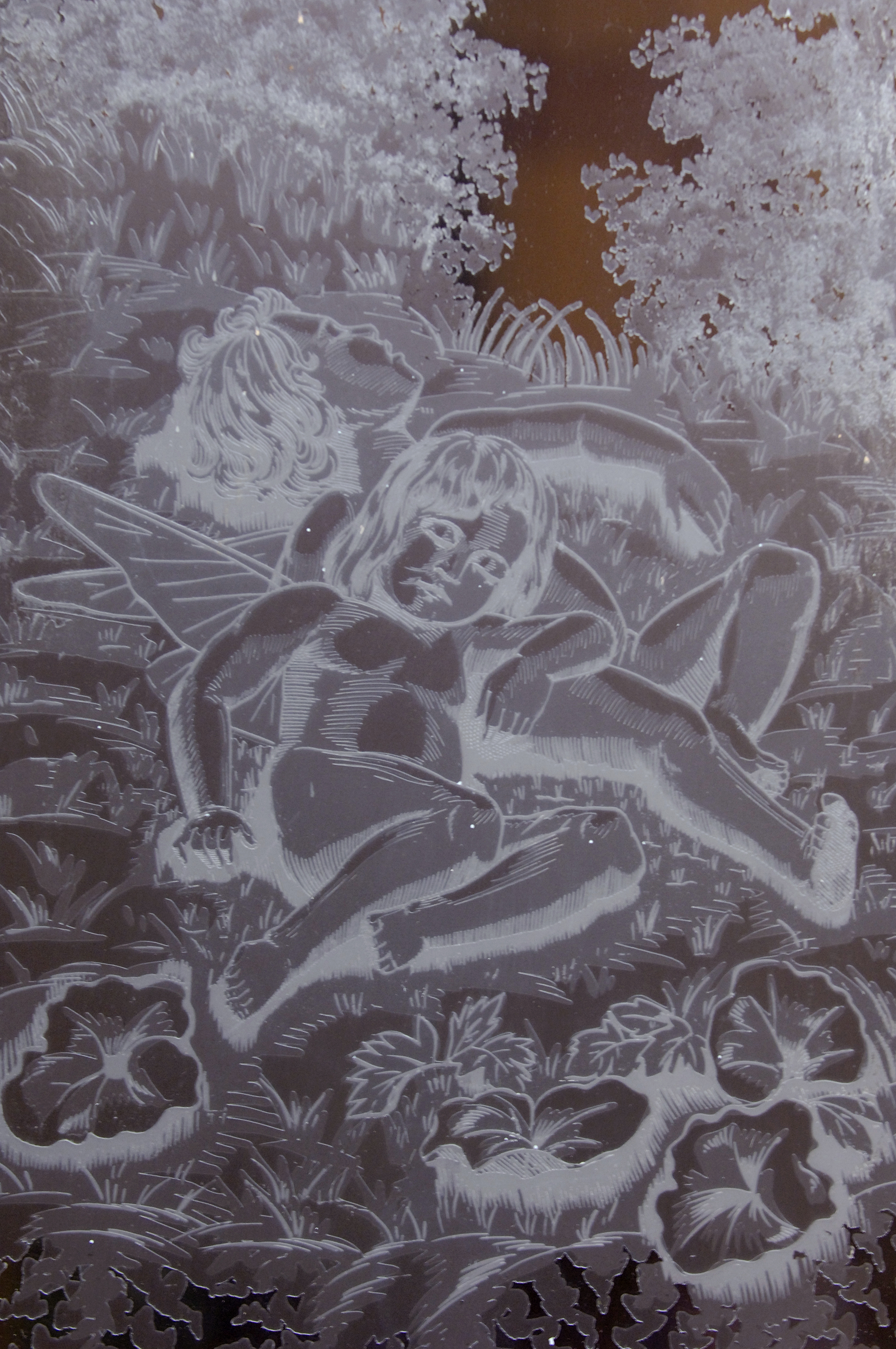
Trabzon Museum Glass panel

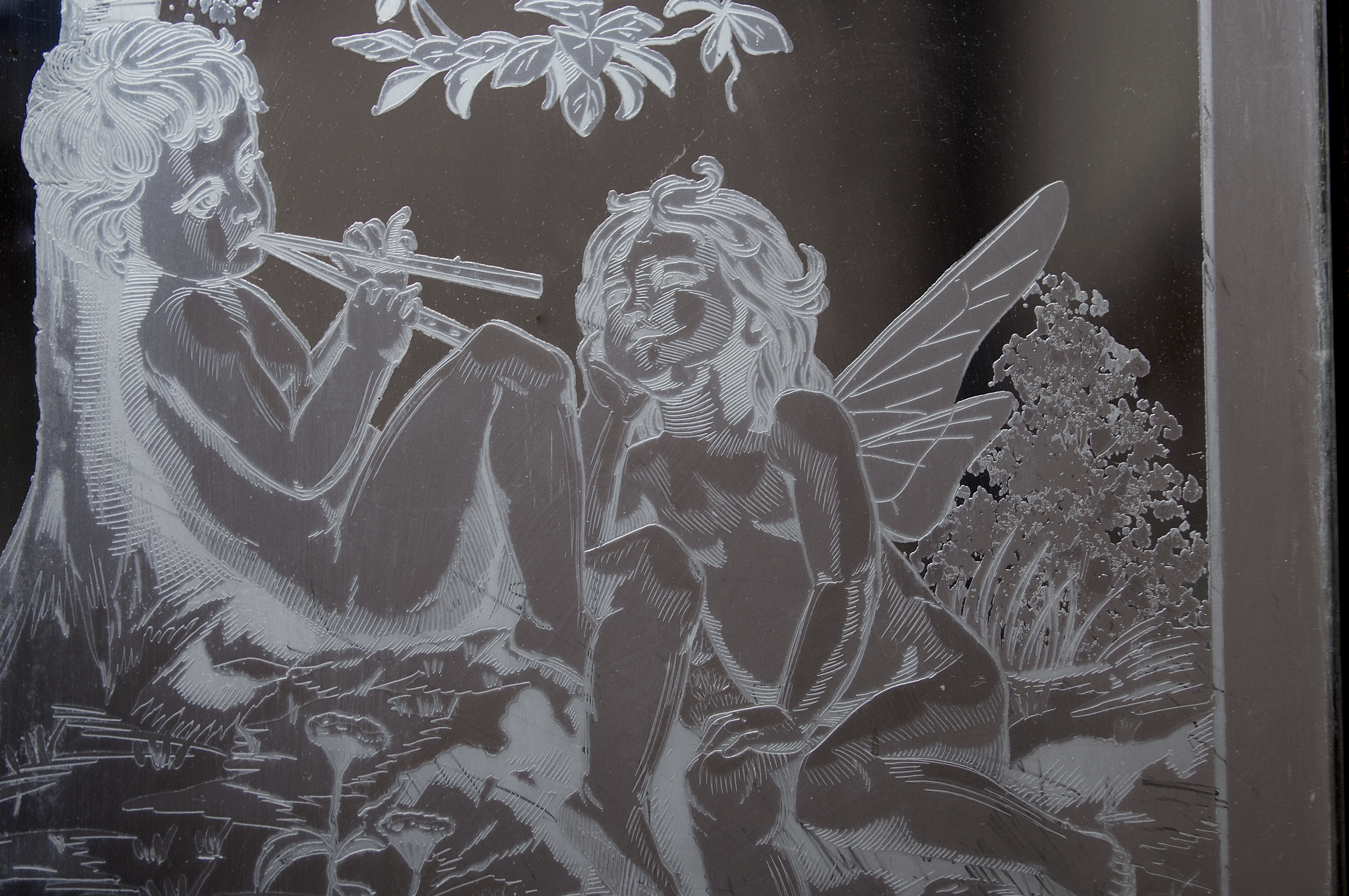
Trabzon Museum Glass panel

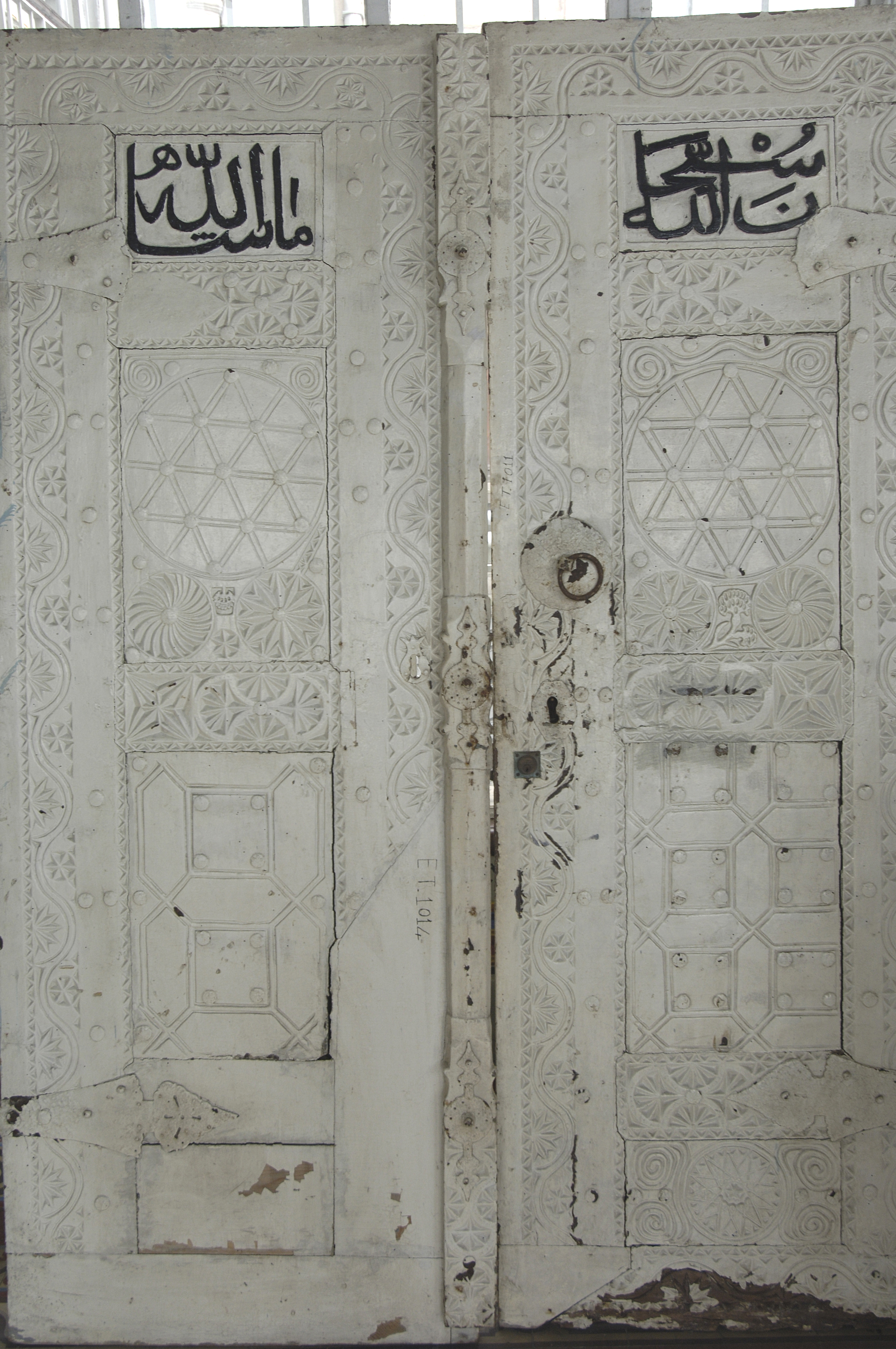
Trabzon Museum Mosque door

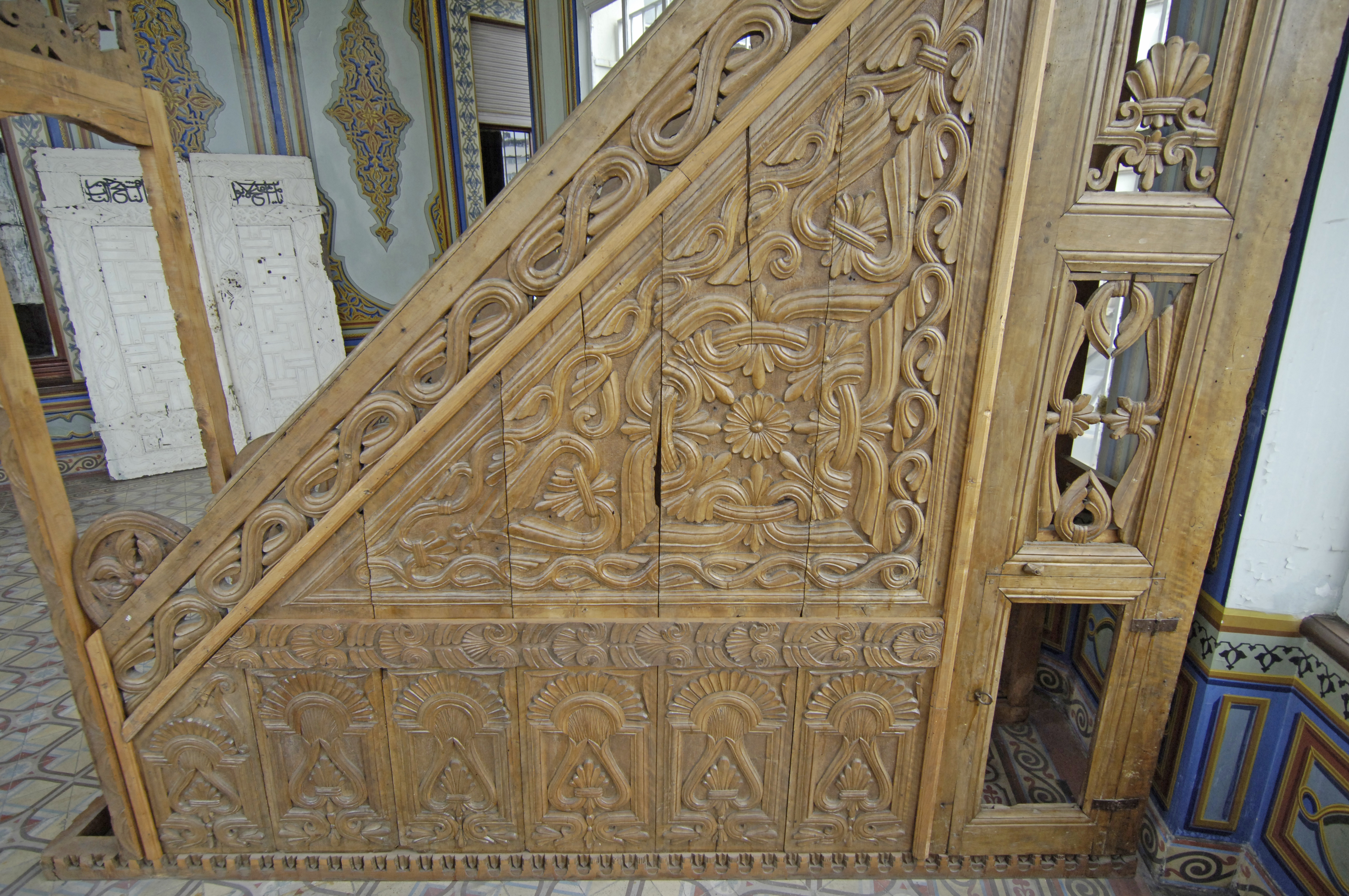
Trabzon Museum Detail of mihrab

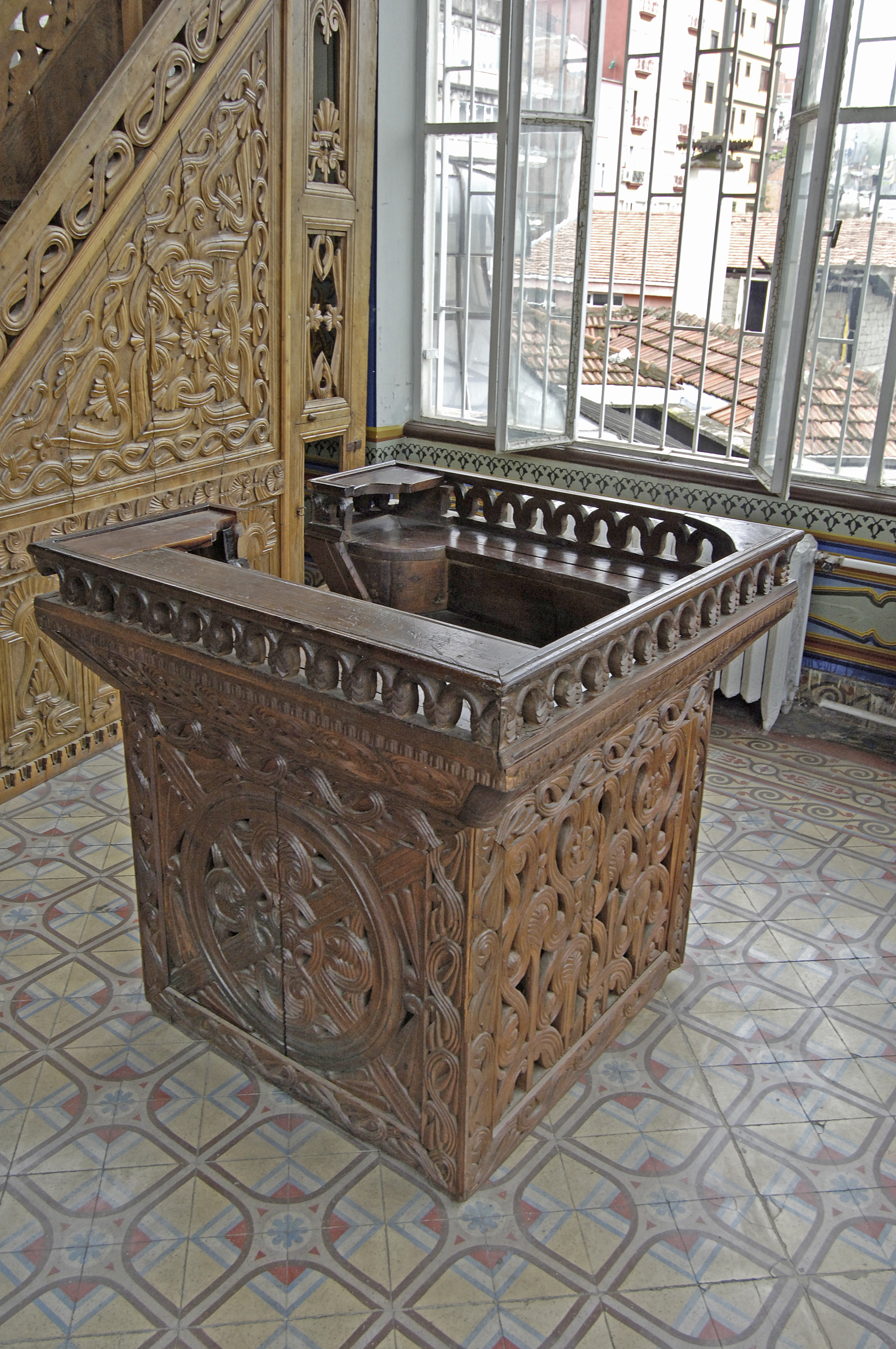
Trabzon Museum Religious objects

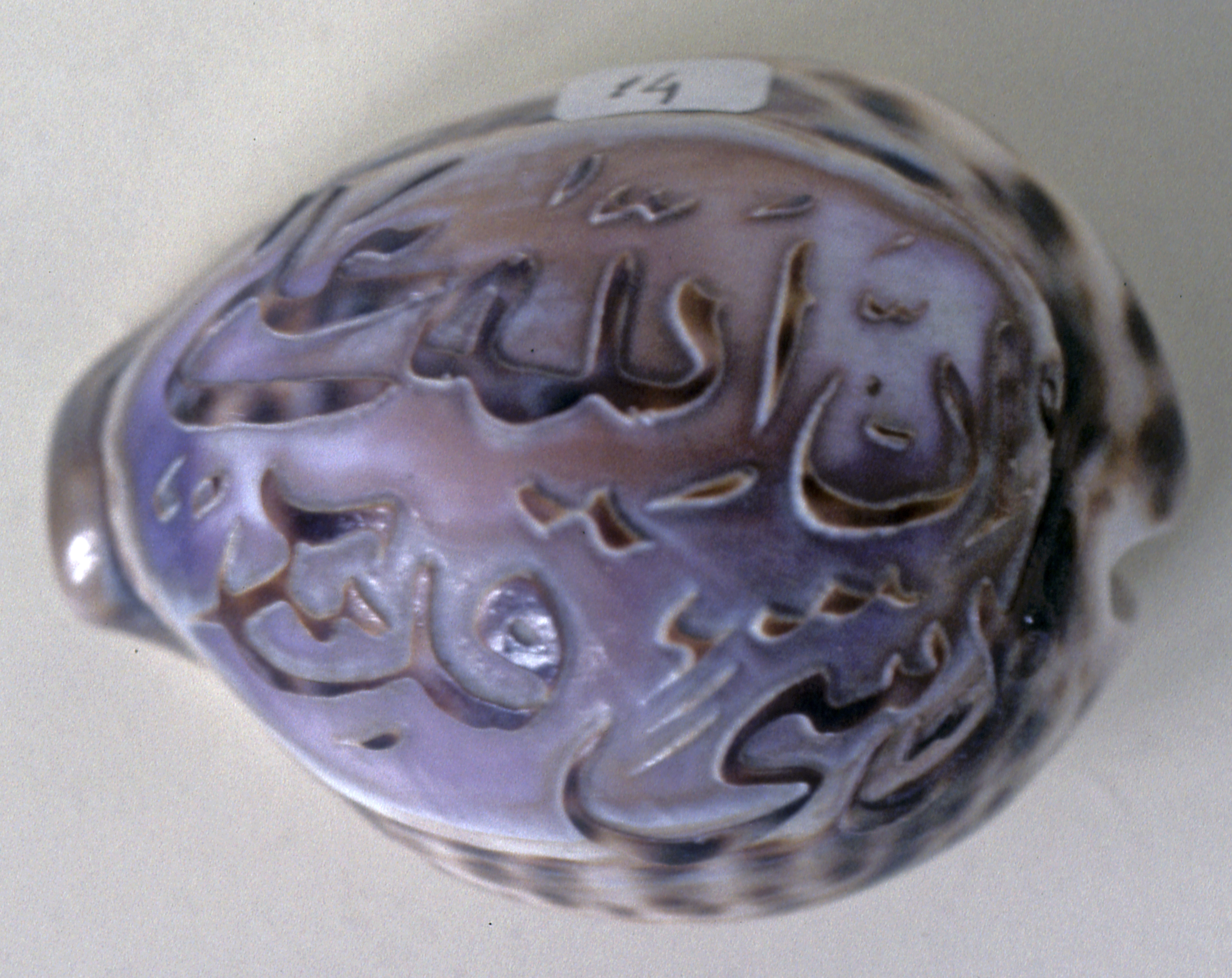
Trabzon Museum Cut shell

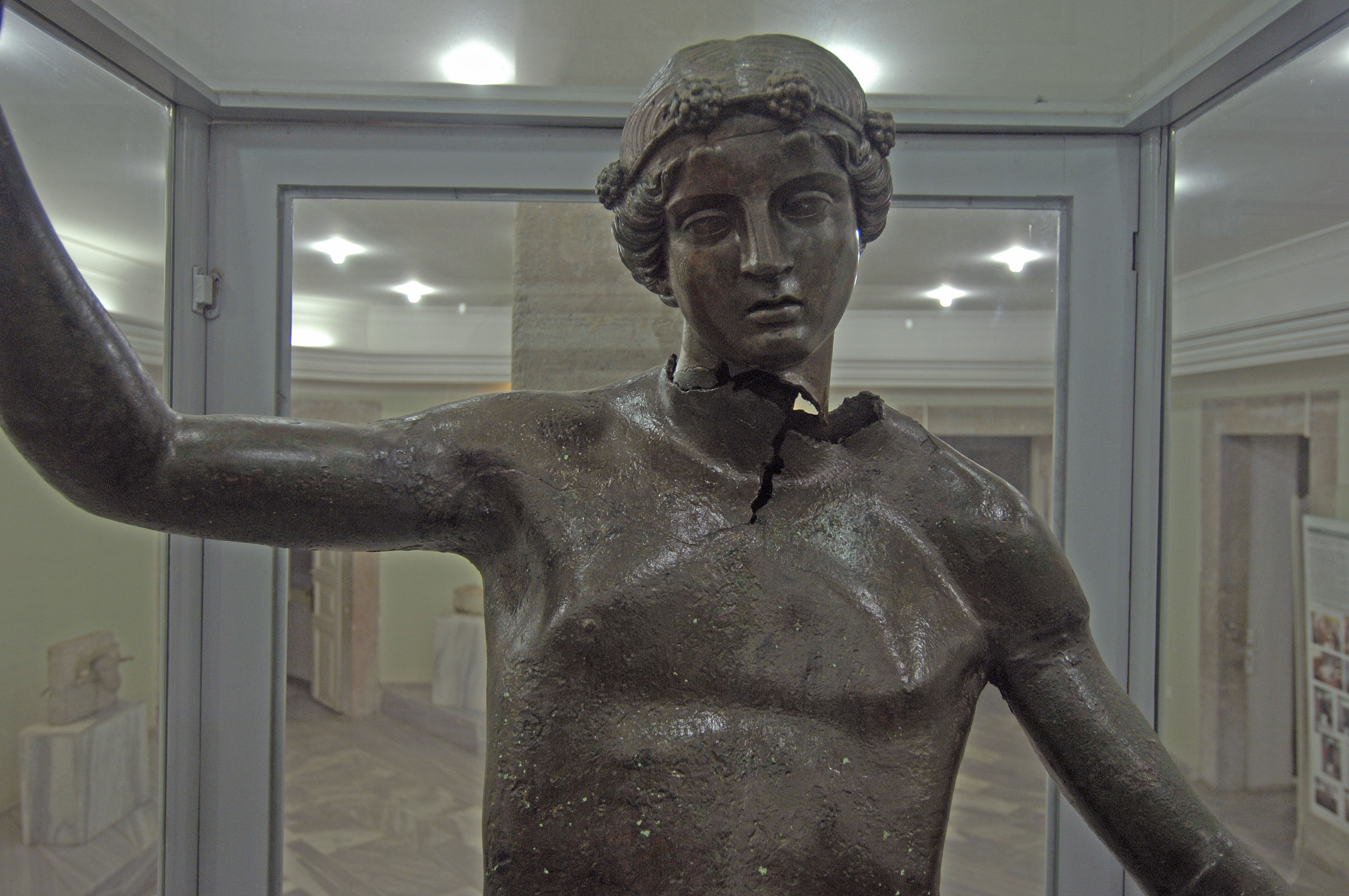
Trabzon Museum Hermes statue

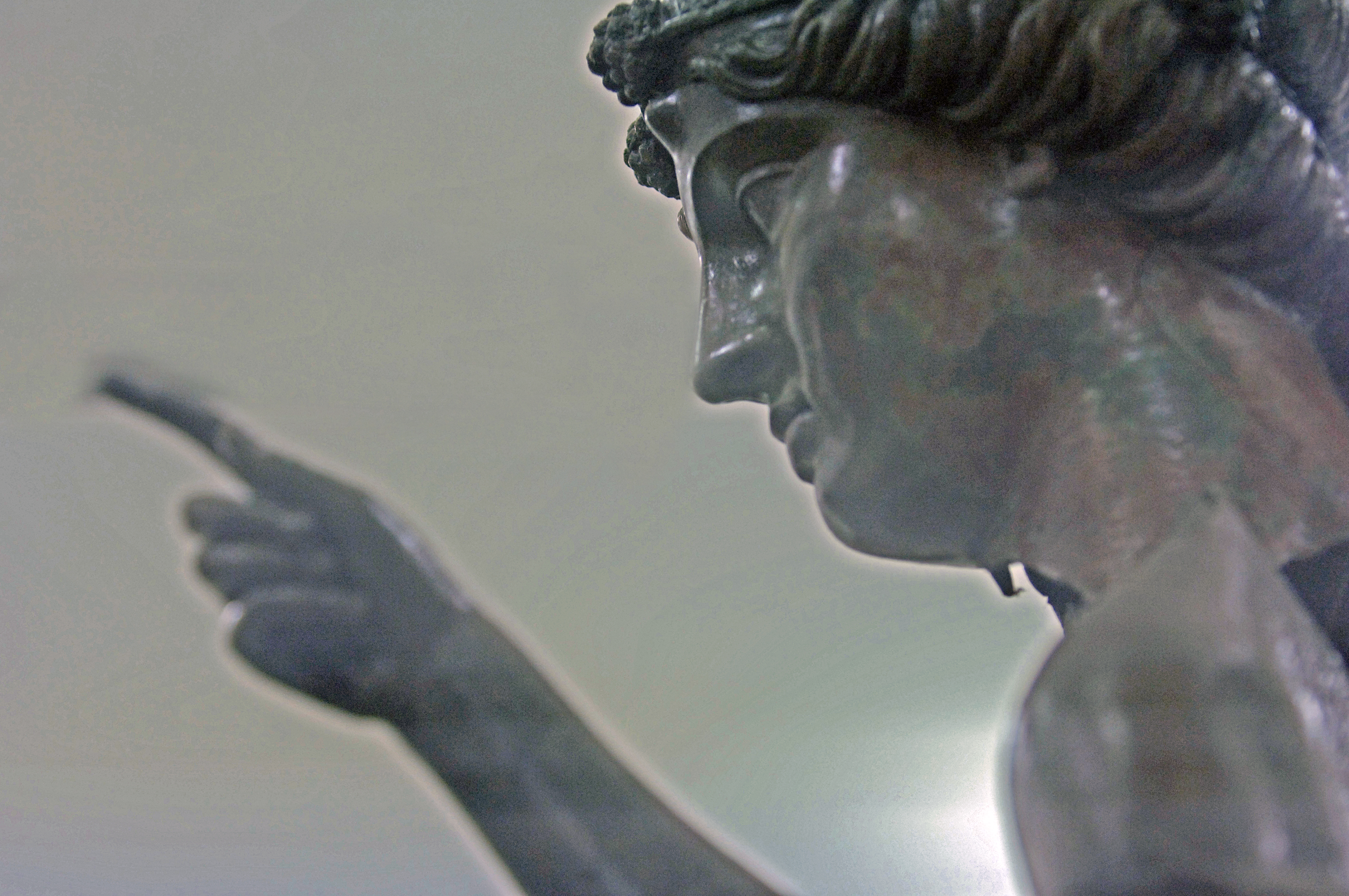
Trabzon Museum Hermes statue

== See also ==
- World Trade Center Trabzon
- Trabzon Province
- Trabzon
