= Tennis at the 2011 European Youth Summer Olympic Festival =

Tennis at the 2011 European Youth Summer Olympic Festival was held from 25 to 29 July 2011. The competitions took place at the Beşirli Court in Trabzon, Turkey. Boys and girls born 1996/1997 or later participated at following 2 disciplines for boys and 2 for girls.

== Medal summary ==
=== Medal table ===
Rank	Nation	Gold	Silver	Bronze	Total
1	Czech Republic	1	1	1	3
2	Latvia	1	0	0	1
2	Poland	1	0	0	1
2	Sweden	1	0	0	1
5	Russia	0	2	0	2
6	Italy	0	1	0	1
7	Belgium	0	0	2	2
8	Lithuania	0	0	1	1
Totals (8 entries)		4	4	4	12

=== Medal events ===
Event	Gold	Silver	Bronze
Boys Singles	Elias Wondwosen; Sweden	Daniil Medvedev; Russia	Clement Geens; Belgium
Girls Singles	Jeļena Ostapenko; Latvia	Ulyana Ayzatulina; Russia	Kateřina Siniaková; Czech Republic
Boys Doubles	Poland; Phillip Gresk; Kamil Majchrzak	Czech Republic; Pavel Staubert; Jaroslav Vondrasek	Belgium; Clement Geens; Omar Salman
Girls Doubles	Czech Republic; Kristýna Roučková; Kateřina Siniaková	Italy; Deborah Chiesa; Beatrice Lombardo	Lithuania; Justina Mikulskytė; Akvilė Paražinskaitė

== See also ==
- European Youth Olympic Festival
