= Basketball at the 2011 European Youth Summer Olympic Festival =

Basketball contests at the 2011 European Youth Summer Olympic Festival were held from July 25, 2011, to July 29, 2011. Competitions for boys teams were played at the Pelitli Arena and for the girls teams at the 19 May Arena in Trabzon, Turkey. Eight nations in two groups of four teams each for boys and girls born 1994/1995 or later took part at the event.

== Medal summary ==
=== Medal table ===
Rank	Nation	Gold	Silver	Bronze	Total
1	Belgium	1	0	0	1
1	Lithuania	1	0	0	1
3	France	0	1	0	1
3	Serbia	0	1	0	1
5	Russia	0	0	1	1
5	Turkey	0	0	1	1
Totals (6 entries)		2	2	2	6

=== Medalist events ===
Event	Gold	Silver	Bronze
Boys	Lithuania	Serbia	Turkey
Girls	Belgium	France	Russia

== Boys ==
=== Group round ===
==== Group A ====
Team	Pld	W	L	PF	PA	PD	Pts
Serbia	3	2	1	267	171	+96	5
Turkey	3	2	1	223	219	+4	5
Montenegro	3	2	1	223	258	–35	5
Latvia	3	0	3	233	298	–65	3

July 25
14:17

Report

Serbia	92–46	Montenegro
Scoring by quarter: 21–4, 24–20, 27–14, 20–8
Pts: Doravic 22; Rebs: Doravic 10; Asts: Vasiljevic, Jugovic, Starincevic, Ililic 3		Pts: Alihodlic 14; Rebs: Alihodlic, Ercegovic 6 Asts: Kasalica, Novosel 2

Hayri Gür Arena, Trabzon
Referees: Sergey Belyankov (RUS), Alexander Romanov (RUS), Abdurrahman Semercioğlu (TUR)

July 25
18:26

Report

Turkey	85–80	Latvia
Scoring by quarter: 25–8, 22–23, 23–28, 15–21
Pts: Baykan 21; Rebs: Baykan 10; Asts: Uğurlu 5		Pts: Itis 21; Rebs: Itis, Stradnieks 9 Asts: Melderis 4

Hayri Gür Arena, Trabzon
Referees: Andrius Maleckas (LTU), Laurent Beck (BEL), Abdurrahman Semercioğlu (TUR)

July 26
14:12

Report

Latvia	55–107	Serbia
Scoring by quarter: 17–32, 16–17, 11–35, 11–23
Pts: Stradnieks 19; Rebs: Arnitis 7 Asts: Melderis 4		Pts: Doravic 22; Rebs: Doravic 13; Asts: Jugovic 11

Hayri Gür Arena, Trabzon
Referees: Andrius Maleckas (LTU), Aurelie Vidot (FRA), Abdurrahman Semercioğlu (TUR)

July 26
18:31

Report

Montenegro	71–68	Turkey
Scoring by quarter: 17–14, 22–20, 15–19, 17–15
Pts: Kasalica 16; Rebs: Pesic, Radunovic 9 Asts: Kasalica 3		Pts: Uğurlu 21; Rebs: Çakmak 8 Asts: Uğurlu 4

Hayri Gür Arena, Trabzon
Referees: Anastasios Manos (GRE), Johannes Jaakko Kaunisto (FIN), Ziya Pala (TUR)

July 27
14:18

Report

Latvia	98–106 (4OT)	Montenegro
Scoring by quarter: 13–21, 12–22, 22–9, 17–12, Overtime: 10–10, 9–9, 11–11, 4–12
Pts: Zonne 27; Rebs: Arnitis 15; Asts: Melderis 10		Pts: Nikolic 24; Rebs: Pesic 17; Asts: Kasalica 3

Hayri Gür Arena, Trabzon
Attendance: 74
Referees: Laurent Beck (BEL), Joske Kuut (NED), Ziya Pala (TUR)

July 27
19:16

Report

Serbia	68–70	Turkey
Scoring by quarter: 23–17, 14–11, 15–18, 16–24
Pts: Simovic 21; Rebs: Simovic 18; Asts: Jugovic 3		Pts: Baygur, Baykan 16; Rebs: Baykan 6 Asts: Ugurlu 6

Hayri Gür Arena, Trabzon
Referees: Alexander Romanov (RUS), Sergey Belyakov (RUS), Emre Turegun (TUR)

==== Group B ====
Team	Pld	W	L	PF	PA	PD	Pts
Lithuania	3	3	0	229	161	+68	6
Greece	3	2	1	228	188	+40	5
Russia	3	1	2	200	184	+16	4
Estonia	3	0	3	137	261	–124	3

July 25
12:11

Report

Lithuania	70–66	Greece
Scoring by quarter: 14-13, 18–20, 16–20, 22–13
Pts: Krimelis 24; Rebs: Sabonis 14; Asts: Zupkauskas 7		Pts: Fakopoulidis 18; Rebs: Michalopoulos 8 Asts: Fakopoulidis 4

Hayri Gür Arena, Trabzon
Referees: Sami Özgök (TUR), Ali Şakacı (TUR), Abdurrahman Semercioğlu (TUR)

July 25
16:15

Report

Russia	72–52	Estonia
Scoring by quarter: 16–11, 16–15, 15–13, 25–13
Pts: Zherdev 13; Rebs: Morozov 6 Asts: Gavrilov 3		Pts: Lill 12; Rebs: Kukk 11; Asts: Meimer 3

Hayri Gür Arena, Trabzon
Referees: Veskovic (SRB), Joske Kuut (NED), Abdurrahman Semercioğlu (TUR)

July 26
12:00

Report

Estonia	38–100	Lithuania
Scoring by quarter: 15–18, 4–31, 8–23, 11–28
Pts: Kukk 12; Rebs: Meimer 4 Asts: Lill 4		Pts: Rupkus 18; Rebs: Sabonis 10; Asts: Montvila 5

Hayri Gür Arena, Trabzon
Referees: Miroslav Kaluderovic (MNE), Danijela Cikic (CRO), Abdurrahman Semercioğlu (TUR)

July 26
16:18

Report

Russia	71–73	Greece
Scoring by quarter: 16–21, 23–16, 13–19, 19–17
Pts: Gavrilov 20; Rebs: Korolyatin, Zherdev 6 Asts: Gavrilov 6		Pts: Fakopoulidis 16; Rebs: Kousiantzas 12; Asts: Pilitsis 6

Hayri Gür Arena, Trabzon
Referees: Elif İnci (TUR), Sami Özel (TUR), Ziya Pala (TUR)

July 27
12:00

Report

Greece	89–47	Estonia
Scoring by quarter: 28-14, 21-7, 17-15, 23-11
Pts: Vaggelis 19; Rebs: Michalopoulos 8 Asts: Athiniotis 6		Pts: Jurno 16; Rebs: Meimer 13; Asts: Talisainen 3

Hayri Gür Arena, Trabzon
Referees: Marcis Senkevics (LAT), Aurelie Vidot (FRA), Ziya Pala (TUR)

July 27
17:04

Report

Russia	57–59	Lithuania
Scoring by quarter: 17–22, 21–4, 10–18, 9–15
Pts: Korolyatin 17; Rebs: Gavrilov 6 Asts: Gavrilov 4		Pts: Krimelis 23; Rebs: Rupkus 9 Asts: Rupkus, Zupkauskas 3

Hayri Gür Arena, Trabzon
Referees: Ali Sakaci (TUR), Vlademir Veskovic (SRB), Emre Turegun (TUR)

=== Final round ===
==== Championship bracket ====
Semifinals
28 July - Trabzon
Lithuania	75
Turkey	50
28 July - Trabzon
Serbia	62
Greece	59

Final
29 July - Trabzon
Lithuania	86
Serbia	79
3rd place
29 July - Trabzon
Turkey	71
Greece	62

==== 5th–8th places bracket ====
5th–8th places
28 July - Trabzon
Montenegro	66
Estonia	54
28 July - Trabzon
Russia	65
Latvia	72

5th place
29 July - Trabzon
Montenegro	61
Latvia	70
7th place
29 July - Trabzon
Estonia	64
Russia	71

==== 5th–8th places ====
July 28
09:57

Report

Montenegro	66–54	Estonia
Scoring by quarter: 17–6, 10–12, 18–19, 21–17
Pts: Kasalica 20; Rebs: Nikolic 10; Asts: Nikolic 5		Pts: Jurno, Andrei 13; Rebs: Meimer 9 Asts: Lill 4

Hayri Gür Arena, Trabzon
Referees: Alexander Romanov (RUS), Ivana Ivanovic (SRB), Emre Turegun (TUR)

July 28
12:16

Report

Russia	65–72	Latvia
Scoring by quarter: 19–14, 22–19, 11–20, 13–19
Pts: Zherdev 20; Rebs: Korolyatin 11; Asts: Gavrilov 3		Pts: Arnitis 22; Rebs: Melderis 14; Asts: Melderis 7

Hayri Gür Arena, Trabzon
Referees: Alper Ozgok (TUR), Danijela Cikic (CRO), Emre Turegun (TUR)

==== Semifinals ====
July 28
14:21

Report

Lithuania	75–50	Turkey
Scoring by quarter: 20–12, 22–15, 12–14, 21–9
Pts: Krimelis 21; Rebs: Pavlovskis 14; Asts: Zupkauskas 4		Pts: Ugurlu 13; Rebs: Baygur 11; Asts: Ugurlu, Ozkaradumas 2

Hayri Gür Arena, Trabzon
Referees: Anastasios Manos (GRE), Marcis Senkevics (LAT), Ziya Pala (TUR)

July 28
16:36

Report

Serbia	62–59	Greece
Scoring by quarter: 10–18, 26–8, 10–13, 16–20
Pts: Doravic 16; Rebs: Doravic 18; Asts: Starincevic 3		Pts: Mantzios 13; Rebs: Fotopoulas 6 Asts: Fakopoulidis 3

Hayri Gür Arena, Trabzon
Referees: Ali Sakaci (TUR), Andrius Maleckas (LTH), Ziya Pala (TUR)

==== 7th place ====
July 29
10:13

Report

Estonia	64–71	Russia
Scoring by quarter: 12–22, 12–15, 16–18, 24–16
Pts: Jurno 26; Rebs: Meimer, Lips 5 Asts: Lill 3		Pts: Morozdov 17; Rebs: Morozdov, Zherdev, Ivanov 7 Asts: Shantaley 4

Hayri Gür Arena, Trabzon
Referees: Sami Ozel (TUR), Johannes Jaakko Kaunisto (FIN), Ziya Pala (TUR)

==== 5th place ====
July 29
12:12

Report

Montenegro	61–70	Latvia
Scoring by quarter: 20–16, 11–21, 16–8, 14–25
Pts: Kasalica 15; Rebs: Pesic, Ercegovic 9 Asts: Andelic 4		Pts: Stradinieks 16; Rebs: Treimanis 12; Asts: Melderis, Arnitis, Treimanis 4

Hayri Gür Arena, Trabzon
Referees: Sergey Belyakov (RUS), Laurent Beck (BEL), Ziya Pala (TUR)

==== 3rd place ====
July 29
14:26

Report

Turkey	71–62	Greece
Scoring by quarter: 18–13, 21–15, 8–14, 24–20
Pts: Baykan 23; Rebs: Baykan 13; Asts: Ugurlu 5		Pts: Pilitsis 17; Rebs: Fotopoulos 9 Asts: Fakopoulidis 3

Hayri Gür Arena, Trabzon
Referees: Miroslav Kaluderovic (MNE), Vlademir Veskovic (SRB), Ziya Pala (TUR)

==== Final ====
July 29
16:46

Report

Lithuania	86–79	Serbia
Scoring by quarter: 22–19, 24–15, 14–17, 26–28
Pts: Paliukenas 27; Rebs: Sabonis 13; Asts: Zupkauskas 8		Pts: Jugovic, Davidovac 14; Rebs: Doravic 12; Asts: Jugovic 4

Hayri Gür Arena, Trabzon
Referees: Elýf Inci (TUR), Alexander Romanov (RUS), Ziya Pala (TUR)

== Girls ==
=== Group round ===
==== Group A ====
Team	Pld	W	L	PF	PA	PD	Pts
Russia	3	3	0	174	132	+42	6
France	3	2	1	147	142	+5	5
Netherlands	3	1	2	195	191	+4	4
Finland	3	0	3	137	188	–51	3

July 25
14:17

Report

France	64–61 (OT)	Netherlands
Scoring by quarter: 16–11, 16–15, 11–12, 12–17, Overtime: 9–6
Pts: Devillers 12; Rebs: Kone 11; Asts: Devillers, Dinga Mbomi 3		Pts: Slim 20; Rebs: Lammerink 6 Asts: Cornelius, Hof 2

19 Mayıs Arena, Trabzon
Referees: Elif İnci (TUR), Ivana Ivanovic (SRB), Ebru Bilaç (TUR)

July 25
18:40

Report

Russia	66–37	Finland
Scoring by quarter: 17–9, 19–11, 22–8, 8–9
Pts: Degtyarskaya 11; Rebs: Degtyarskaya 7 Asts: Komarova 4		Pts: Aijanen 11; Rebs: Aijanen, Menna 7 Asts: Melderis 4

19 Mayıs Arena, Trabzon
Referees: Marcis Senkevic (LAT), Danijela Cikic (CRO), Ebru Bilaç (TUR)

July 26
14:16

Report

Finland	36–49	France
Scoring by quarter: 5–20, 9–9, 9–11, 13–9
Pts: Dolivo 7 Rebs: Jamsa 5 Asts: Noponen 3		Pts: Guapo 11; Rebs: Gaye 13; Asts: Dinga Mbomi, Millavet 2

19 Mayıs Arena, Trabzon
Referees: Ali Şakacı (TUR), Laurent Beck (BEL), Emre Türegün (TUR)

July 26
18:33

Report

Netherlands	61–63	Russia
Scoring by quarter: 15–16, 10–14, 17–19, 19–14
Pts: Slim 18; Rebs: Hof 8 Asts: Rikhof 3		Pts: Ilinova 15; Rebs: Degtyarskaya 9 Asts: Fedorova 5

19 Mayıs Arena, Trabzon
Referees: Alper Özgök (TUR), Vlademir Veskovic (SRB, Ebru Bilaç (TUR)

July 27
14:23

Report

Finland	64–73	Netherlands
Scoring by quarter: 17-20, 18-18, 13-14, 16-21
Pts: Aijanen 16; Rebs: Aijanen 9 Asts: Jamsa 3		Pts: Lammerink 23; Rebs: Lammerink, Guijt 6 Asts: Slim 4

19 Mayıs Arena, Trabzon
Referees: Elif İnci (TUR), Ivana Ivanovic (SRB), Ebru Bilaç (TUR)

July 27
18:46

Report

France	34–45	Russia
Scoring by quarter: 14–8, 4–14, 11–11, 5–12
Pts: Devillers 12; Rebs: Gaye 8 Asts: Gaye, Guapo, Mane 1		Pts: Degtyarskaya 10; Rebs: Chaykovskaya 11; Asts: Safonova 4

19 Mayıs Arena, Trabzon
Referees: Sami Ozel (TUR), Danijela Cikic (CRO), Abdurrahman Semerci (TUR)

==== Group B ====
Team	Pld	W	L	PF	PA	PD	Pts
Turkey	3	3	0	200	176	+20	6
Belgium	3	2	1	184	177	+11	5
Serbia	3	1	2	185	183	+2	4
Croatia	3	0	3	162	195	–33	3

July 25
14:26

Report

Croatia	61–68	Belgium
Scoring by quarter: 15–19, 18–23, 13–16, 15–10
Pts: Chiabov 14; Rebs: Chiabov 12; Asts: Chiabov, Racki, Saric 2		Pts: Ben Abdelkader 15; Rebs: Bernard 8 Asts: Chiabov 5

19 Mayıs Arena, Trabzon
Referees: Anastasios Manos (GRE), Johannes Jaakko Kaunisto (FIN), Ebru Bilaç (TUR)

July 25
16:23

Report

Turkey	73–69	Serbia
Scoring by quarter: 13-18, 16–24, 14–9, 30-18
Pts: Bodur 14; Rebs: Çoklar 17; Asts: Başaran 4		Pts: Crvendakic 17; Rebs: Crvendakic 10; Asts: Andic 6

19 Mayıs Arena, Trabzon
Referees: Miroslav Kaluderovix (MNE), Aurelie Vidot (FRA), Ebru Bilaç (TUR)

July 26
12:02

Report

Belgium	60–56	Serbia
Scoring by quarter: 23-10, 10–17, 12–20, 15-9
Pts: Ben Abdelkader 15; Rebs: Bernard 14; Asts: Allemand 3		Pts: Crvendakic 17; Rebs: Crvendakic 7 Asts: Mandic 6

19 Mayıs Arena, Trabzon
Referees: Marcis Senkevic (LAT), Sergey Belyankov (RUS), Emre Türegün (TUR)

July 26
16:36

Report

Croatia	51–67	Turkey
Scoring by quarter: 9-15, 15–12, 15–20, 12-20
Pts: Matic 20; Rebs: Chiabov 9 Asts: Matic, Chiabov, Racki 1		Pts: Çoklar, Akbaş, Bodur, Ölçek 10; Rebs: Çoklar 13; Asts: Akbaş, Bodur 4

19 Mayıs Arena, Trabzon
Referees: Alexandra Romanov (RUS), Joske Kut (NED), Ebru Bilaç (TUR)

July 27
12:11

Report

Serbia	60–50	Croatia
Scoring by quarter: 11-14, 16-6, 12-16, 21-14
Pts: Mandic 19; Rebs: Crvendakic, Andjelkovic 7 Asts: Mandic 5		Pts: Matic 14; Rebs: Chiabov, Bura 8 Asts: Racki 2

19 Mayıs Arena, Trabzon
Referees: Miroslav Kaluserovic (MNE), Johannes Jaakko Kaunisto (FIN), Ebru Bilaç (TUR)

July 27
16:40

Report

Turkey	60–56	Belgium
Scoring by quarter: 17–25, 12–7, 17–12, 14–12
Pts: Coklar 19; Rebs: Coklar 13; Asts: Basaran 5		Pts: Bernard 12; Rebs: Nauwelaers 14; Asts: Ben Abdelkader 4

19 Mayıs Arena, Trabzon
Referees: Anastasios Manos (GRE), Andrews Maleckas (LTU), Abdurrahman Semerci (TUR)

=== Final round ===
==== Championship bracket ====
Semifinals
28 July - Trabzon
Turkey	47
France	52
28 July - Trabzon
Russia	59
Belgium	75

Final
29 July - Trabzon
France	58
Belgium	65
3rd place
29 July - Trabzon
Turkey	45
Russia	71

==== 5th–8th places bracket ====
5th–8th places
28 July - Trabzon
Netherlands	64
Croatia	55
28 July - Trabzon
Serbia	74
Finland	80

5th place
29 July - Trabzon
Netherlands	51
Finland	41
7th place
29 July - Trabzon
Croatia	71
Serbia	67

==== 5th–8th places ====
July 28
12:03

Report

Netherlands	64–55	Croatia
Scoring by quarter: 22–15, 12–13, 18–13, 12–14
Pts: Slim 21; Rebs: Hof 7 Asts: Cornelius 5		Pts: Saric 12; Rebs: Chiabov 14; Asts: Butina, Dujic 2

19 Mayıs Arena, Trabzon
Referees: Johannes Jaakko Kaunisto (FIN), Sami Ozel (TUR), Abdurrahman Semerci (TUR)

July 28
14:22

Report

Serbia	74–80	Finland
Scoring by quarter: 17–20, 17–19, 14–19, 26–22
Pts: Mandic 19; Rebs: Andjelkovic 8 Asts: Mandic, Crvendakic 5		Pts: Jamsa 26; Rebs: Menna 8 Asts: Jamsa 6

19 Mayıs Arena, Trabzon
Referees: Laurent Beck (BEL), Joske Kuut (NED), Abdurrahman Semerci (TUR)

==== Semifinals ====
July 28
16:45

Report

Russia	59–75	Belgium
Scoring by quarter: 11–22, 16–24, 19–16, 13–13
Pts: Safonova 13; Rebs: Shomodi 7 Asts: Maiga, Shomodi, Degtyarskaya 2		Pts: Ben Abdelkader 20; Rebs: Ben Abdelkader 8 Asts: Allemand 8

19 Mayıs Arena, Trabzon
Referees: Miroslav Kaluderovic (MNT), Aurelie Vidot (FRA), Ebru Bilac (TUR)

July 28
18:42

Report

Turkey	47–52	France
Scoring by quarter: 17–11, 6–15, 13–9, 11–17
Pts: Coklar 16; Rebs: Coklar 10; Asts: Bodur, Catalbas, Manlaci 2		Pts: Dinga Mbomi 11; Rebs: Millavet 8 Asts: Devillers 2

19 Mayıs Arena, Trabzon
Referees: Sergey Belyankov (RUS), Vlademir Veskovic (SRB), Ebru Bilac (TUR)

==== 7th place ====
July 29
09:03

Report

Croatia	71–67	Serbia
Scoring by quarter: 8–21, 21–17, 19–11, 23–18
Pts: Matic 18; Rebs: Chiabov 19; Asts: Matic, Butina 6		Pts: Nikitovic 19; Rebs: Ristic 7 Asts: Nikitovic 2

19 Mayıs Arena, Trabzon
Referees: Ali Sakaci (TUR), Joske Kuut (NED), Abdurrahman Semerci (TUR)

==== 5th place ====
July 29
11:15

Report

Netherlands	51–41	Finland
Scoring by quarter: 14–11, 10–13, 12–10, 5–7
Pts: Lammerink 16; Rebs: Slim 12; Asts: Lammerink, Guijt 3		Pts: Purhonen 10; Rebs: Purhonen 8 Asts: Jamsa, Hamalainen 2

19 Mayıs Arena, Trabzon
Referees: Aurelie Vidot (FRA), Ivana Ivanovic (SRB), Abdurrahman Semerci (TUR)

==== 3rd place ====
July 29
13:30

Report

Turkey	45–71	Russia
Scoring by quarter: 6–26, 16–17, 17–9, 6–19
Pts: Akbaş 13; Rebs: Çoklar 13; Asts: Catalbas 2		Pts: Komarova 16; Rebs: Tsukanova 15; Asts: Ilinova 5

19 Mayıs Arena, Trabzon
Referees: Anastasios Manos (GRE), Andrius Maleckas (LTU), Ebru Bilaç (TUR)

==== Final ====
July 29
15:45

Report

France	58–65	Belgium
Scoring by quarter: 12–17, 7–18, 19–15, 20–15
Pts: Morateur, Kone 12; Rebs: Kone 8 Asts: Devillers 4		Pts: Ben Abdelkader 34; Rebs: Nauwelaers 8 Asts: Ben Abdelkader 5

19 Mayıs Arena, Trabzon
Referees: Alper Ozgok (TUR), Danijela Cikic (CRO), Ebru Bilaç (TUR)
