= Volleyball at the 2011 European Youth Summer Olympic Festival =

Volleyball contests at the 2011 European Youth Summer Olympic Festival were held from July 25, 2011 to July 29, 2011. Competitions for boys were played at the Araklı Arena and for the girls at the Arsin Arena in Trabzon, Turkey. Eight nations each for boys and girls took part at the event.

== Medal summary ==
=== Medal table ===
Rank	Nation	Gold	Silver	Bronze	Total
1	Turkey	1	0	1	2
2	Italy	1	0	0	1
3	Russia	0	1	0	1
3	Serbia	0	1	0	1
5	France	0	0	1	1
Totals (5 entries)		2	2	2	6

=== Medalist events ===
Event	Gold	Silver	Bronze
Boys	Poland	Bulgaria	Italy
Girls	Turkey	Serbia	Italy

== Boys ==
=== Group round ===
==== Group A ====
#	Team	MP	W	L	SW	SL	PS	PL	Pts
1	Turkey	3	2	1	8	5	282	269	7
2	Serbia	3	2	1	7	4	253	225	6
3	Spain	3	1	2	6	8	289	290	3
4	Bulgaria	3	1	2	4	8	235	275	2

2011–07–25
Serbia	1–3	Turkey	21–25	25–18	14–25	22–25		82–93
Bulgaria	3–2	Spain	25–20	23–25	13–25	25–21	15–13	101–104
2011–07–26
Turkey	2–3	Spain	25–23	25–19	20–25	15–25	8–15	93–107
Serbia	3–0	Bulgaria	25–17	25–19	25–18			75–54
2011–07–27
Turkey	3–1	Bulgaria	25–18	25–18	21–25	25–19		96–80
Spain	1–3	Serbia	20–25	18–25	25–21	15–25		78–96

==== Group B ====
#	Team	MP	W	L	SW	SL	PS	PL	Pts
1	France	3	2	1	8	3	263	241	7
2	Russia	3	2	1	6	4	233	212	6
3	Greece	3	2	1	7	7	306	309	4
4	Belgium	3	0	3	2	9	215	255	1

2011–07–25
France	3–0	Belgium	25–15	25–22	26–24			76–61
Russia	3–1	Greece	21–25	25–18	25–19	25–22		96–84
2011–07–26
Belgium	2–3	Greece	25–16	25–23	22–25	20–25	9–15	101–104
France	3–0	Russia	25–20	25–20	25–22			75–62
2011–07–27
Belgium	0–3	Russia	16–25	18–25	19–25			53–75
Greece	3–2	France	29–31	25–22	23–25	25–20	16–14	118–112

=== Final round ===
Semifinal 1–4
July 28 – Trabzon
Russia	3
France	2
July 28 – Trabzon
Turkey	3
Serbia	2

Gold-medal match
July 29 – Trabzon
Russia	1
Turkey	3
Bronze-medal match
July 29 – Trabzon
France	3
Serbia	1

Semifinal 5–8
July 28 – Trabzon
Spain	3
Belgium	1
July 28 – Trabzon
Bulgaria	3
Greece	2

Fifth place match
July 29 – Trabzon
Spain	1
Bulgaria	3
Sevent place match
July 29 – Trabzon
Belgium	0
Greece	3

==== Semifinal 5–8 ====
2011–07–28
Spain	3–1	Belgium	25–19	25–21	21–25	25–12		96–77
Bulgaria	3–2	Greece	25–22	25–22	19–25	17–25	15–9	101–103

==== Semifinal 1–4 ====
2011–07–28
Russia	3–2	France	21–25	25–19	25–23	16–25	15–11	102–103
Turkey	3–2	Serbia	15–25	25–23	15–25	25–23	15–9	95–105

==== Sevent place match ====
2011–07–28
Belgium	0–3	Greece	14–25	20–25	16–25	50–75

==== Fifth place match ====
2011–07–28
Spain	1–3	Bulgaria	23–25	25–22	22–25	23–25	93–97

==== Bronze-medal match ====
2011–07–28
France	3–1	Serbia	25–16	25–15	22–25	25–20	97–76

==== Gold-medal match ====
2011–07–28
Russia	1–3	Turkey	25–20	20–25	21–25	20–25	86–95

== Girls ==
=== Group round ===
==== Group A ====
#	Team	MP	W	L	SW	SL	PS	PL	Pts
1	Turkey	3	3	0	9	1	242	164	9
2	Poland	3	2	1	7	3	228	211	6
3	Slovakia	3	1	2	3	6	169	209	3
4	Belgium	3	0	3	0	9	172	227	0

2011–07–25
Turkey	3–0	Belgium	25–14	25–20	25–11		75–45
Poland	3–0	Slovakia	25–20	25–16	25–15		75–51
2011–07–26
Belgium	0–3	Slovakia	23–25	23–25	13–25		59–75
Turkey	3–1	Poland	25–20	17–25	25–9	25–22	92–76
2011–07–27
Belgium	0–3	Poland	22–25	25–27	21–25		68–77
Slovakia	0–3	Turkey	14–25	21–25	8–25		43–75

==== Group B ====
#	Team	MP	W	L	SW	SL	PS	PL	Pts
1	Italy	3	3	0	9	3	278	214	8
2	Serbia	3	2	1	8	5	293	248	7
3	Greece	3	1	2	4	7	213	263	3
4	Slovenia	3	0	3	3	9	228	287	0

2011–07–25
Italy	3–1	Slovenia	20–25	25–23	25–9	25–11		95–68
Serbia	3–1	Greece	25–16	22–25	25–15	25–15		97–71
2011–07–26
Slovenia	1–3	Greece	21–25	25–17	24–26	21–25		91–93
Italy	3–2	Serbia	25–19	25–20	23–25	20–25	15–8	108–97
2011–07–27
Slovenia	1–3	Serbia	16–25	26–24	14–25	13–25		69–99
Greece	0–3	Italy	18–25	15–25	16–25			49–75

=== Final round ===
Semifinal 1–4
July 28 – Trabzon
Turkey	2
Serbia	3
July 28 – Trabzon
Italy	3
Poland	1

Gold-medal match
July 29 – Trabzon
Serbia	1
Italy	3
Bronze-medal match
July 29 – Trabzon
Turkey	3
Poland	0

Semifinal 5–8
July 28 – Trabzon
Slovakia	0
Slovenia	3
July 28 – Trabzon
Belgium	3
Greece	0

Fifth place match
July 29 – Trabzon
Slovenia	3
Belgium	2
Sevent place match
July 29 – Trabzon
Slovakia	1
Greece	3

==== Semi Final 5–8 ====
2011–07–28
Slovakia	0–3	Slovenia	21–25	13–25	23–25	57–75
Belgium	3–0	Greece	25–19	25–23	25–18	75–60

==== Semi Final 1–4 ====
2011–07–28
Italy	2–3	Poland	25–22	25–22	24–26	21–25	13–15	108–110
Turkey	3–1	Serbia	25–18	25–27	25–21	25–17		100–83

==== Sevent place match ====
2011–07–28
Slovakia	1–3	Greece	24–26	18–25	25–16	19–25	86–92

==== Fifth place match ====
2011–07–28
Slovenia	3– 2	Belgium	25–21	20–25	27–25	23–25	15–8	110–104

==== Bronze-medal match ====
2011–07–28
Turkey	3–0	Poland	25–12	25–20	25–15	75–47

==== Gold-medal match ====
2011–07–28
Serbia	1–3	Italy	18–25	25–17	14–25	27–29	84–96
