= Araklı =

- District and municipality
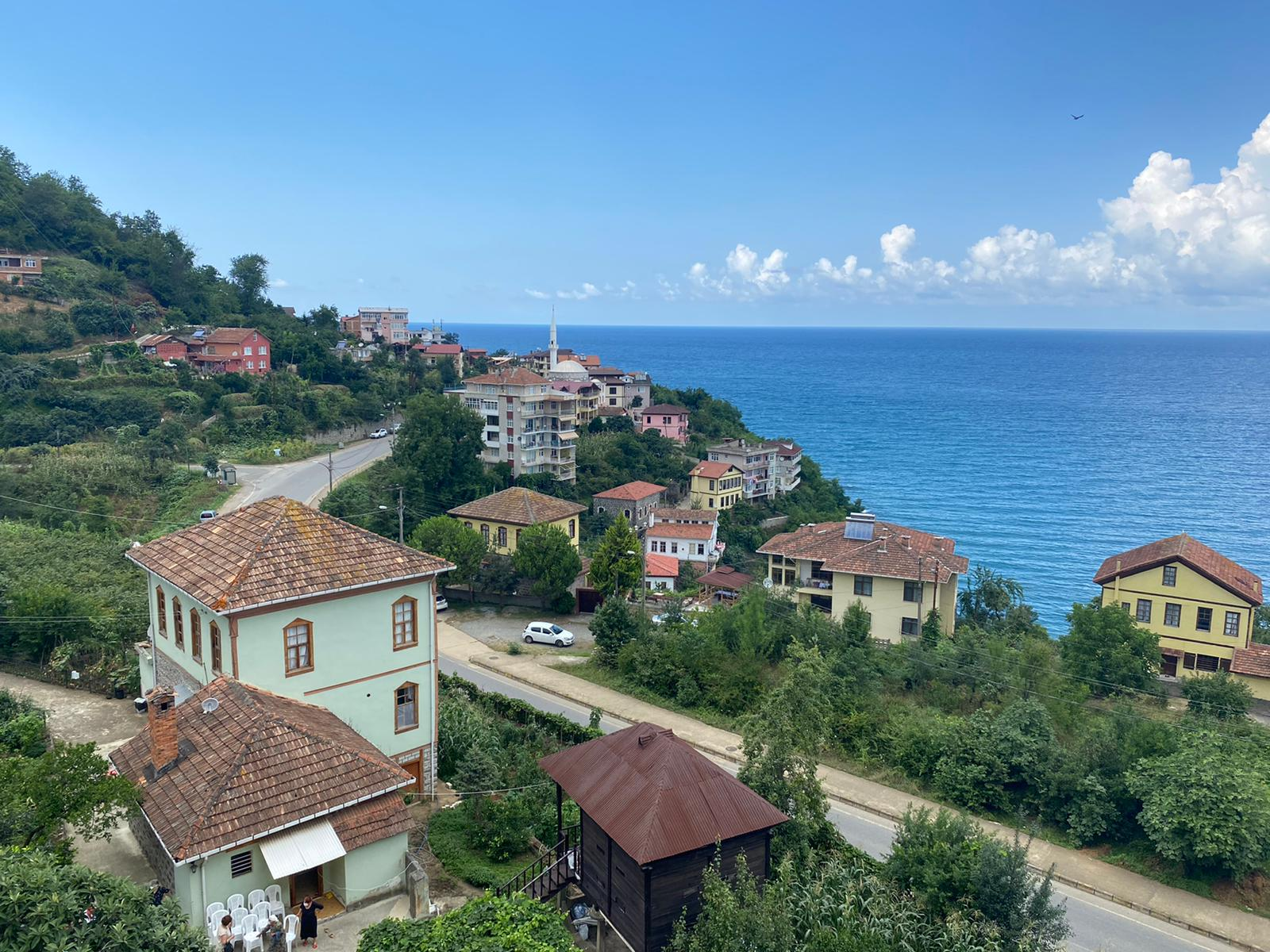

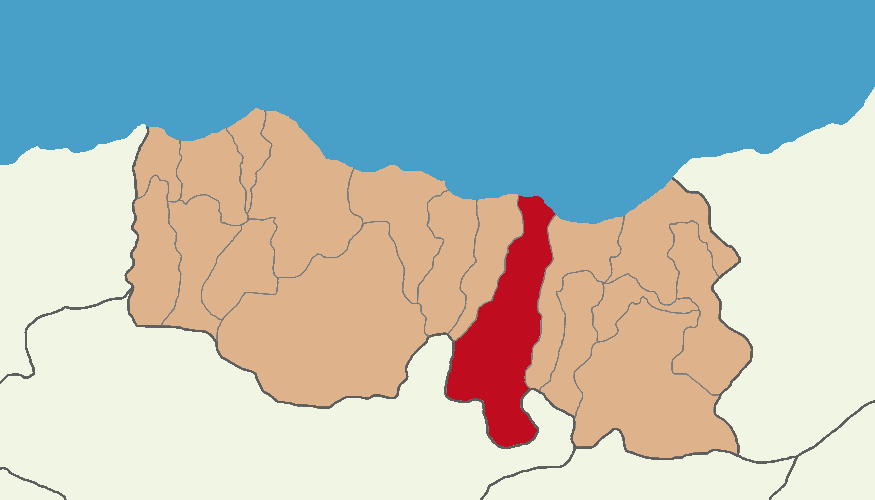
- Map showing Araklı District in Trabzon Province

- Location within Turkey
- Coordinates: 40°56′N 40°03′E
- Country: Turkey
- Province: Trabzon

Government
  - Mayor: Recep Çebi (AKP)
- Area: 464 km^{2} (179 sq mi)
- Population (2022): 48,581
  - Density: 105/km^{2} (271/sq mi)
- Time zone: UTC+3 (TRT)
- Postal code: 61700
- Area code: 0462
- Website: www.arakli.bel.tr

Araklı (from Greek "Ηράκλεια" - Erakleia) is a municipality and district of Trabzon Province, Turkey. Its area is 464 km^{2}, and its population is 48,581 (2022). The mayor is Recep Çebi (AKP). It is also claimed that the name "Araklı" is derived from 'Arakale', "the castle in the middle" in Turkish.

== Composition ==
There are 50 neighbourhoods in Araklı District:

- Aytaş
- Ayvadere
- Bahçecik
- Bereketli
- Birlik
- Buzluca
- Çamlıca
- Çamlıktepe
- Çankaya
- Çiftepınar
- Çukurçayır
- Değirmencik
- Erenler
- Erikli
- Halilli
- Hasköy
- Hürriyet
- İyisu
- Kalecik
- Karatepe
- Karşıyaka
- Kayacık
- Kayaiçi
- Kaymaklı
- Kestanelik
- Köprüüstü
- Kükürtlü
- Merkez
- Merkezköy
- Ortaköy
- Özgen
- Pervane
- Sulakyurt
- Sularbaşı
- Taşgeçit
- Taşönü
- Taştepe
- Türkeli
- Turnalı
- Yalıboyu
- Yassıkaya
- Yeniköy
- Yeşilce
- Yeşilköy
- Yeşilyurt
- Yiğitözü
- Yıldızlı
- Yolgören
- Yoncalı
- Yüceyurt

== See also ==
- Araklı Arena

== Notable natives ==
- Havvanur Kethüda (born 2007), female boxer
