= Kadirga Festival =

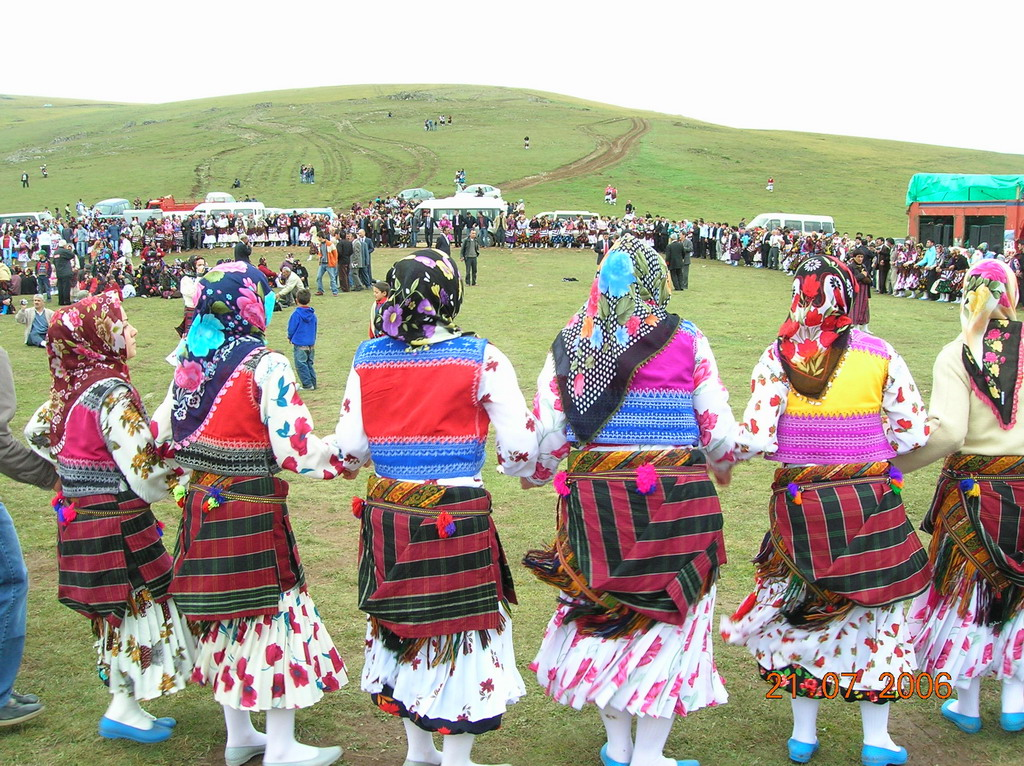
Traditional dancing in festival time

The Kadirga Festival is the most famous of all Turkish festivities. The festival takes place in one of the yayla (plateaus) about 25 kilometers from Tonya (a town in Trabzon Province).

The magnificent treeless mountaintop where the festival takes place is located at the juncture of the territories of Beşikdüzü, Tonya, Maçka, Torul, Eynesil and Görele. People from the four districts gather on the mountaintop during the third week of July for three days of wild revelry. Some of the celebrations suggest a ritualistic origin from ancient and forgotten hostilities related to the delicate issue of yayla demarcation amongst the various communities of the mountains.
