= Black Sea Games =

Multi-sport event

2007 Black Sea Games
- Host city: Trabzon
- Country: Turkey
- Opening: July 2, 2007
- Closing: July 8, 2007

The Black Sea Games was a multi-sport event intended to be held every four years, mainly for nations bordering the Black Sea.

The first such event was held in Trabzon, Turkey July 2 to July 8, 2007. A total of 1,277 athletes (937 men and 340 women) from 11 countries participated, with 186 medals won in 13 different sports.

Subsequent games were originally scheduled for 2010 (Constanța, Romania) and 2014 (Samsun, Turkey), but were not held.

== Participating countries ==
- Albania
- Armenia
- Azerbaijan
- Bulgaria
- Georgia
- Greece
- Moldova
- Romania
- Russia
- Turkey (Host Nation)
- Ukraine

Countries that did not participate during the Games :

- Serbia

== Sports ==
- Archery
- Athletics
- Basketball
- Cycling
- Football
- Gymnastics
- Swimming
- Taekwondo
- Volleyball
- Wrestling

Paralympic events were contested in the archery, athletics, and swimming programmes.

== Medal table ==
* Host nation (Turkey)

Rank	Nation	Gold	Silver	Bronze	Total
1	Russia	86	57	31	174
2	Turkey*	39	40	41	120
3	Ukraine	21	23	12	56
4	Greece	15	23	51	89
5	Romania	10	15	29	54
6	Azerbaijan	9	7	11	27
7	Georgia	6	8	20	34
8	Moldova	0	3	15	18
9	Armenia	0	2	12	14
10	Bulgaria	0	2	3	5
11	Albania	0	2	1	3
Totals (11 entries)		186	182	226	594

== See also ==
- CIS Games
