= List of settlements in the Kozani regional unit =

The following is an extensive alphabetically sorted list of settlements in the Kozani regional unit, in Greece.

== A ==
- Achladia
- Agia Kyriaki
- Agia Paraskevi
- Agia Sotira
- Agiasma
- Agioi Anargyroi
- Agioi Theodoroi
- Agios Charalampos
- Agios Christoforos
- Agios Dimitrios
- Agios Theodoros
- Aiani
- Aidonochori
- Akrini
- Aliakmonas
- Alonakia
- Amygdalea
- Anarrachi
- Anatoliko, Eordaia
- Anatoliko, Kozani
- Ano Komi
- Anthochori
- Anthotopos
- Anthousa
- Apidia
- Ardassa
- Argilos
- Asproula
- Asvestopetra
- Avgerinos
- Avgi
- Avles
- Axiokastro

== C ==
- Charavgi
- Cheimerino
- Chorigos
- Chromio
- Chrysavgi

== D ==
- Dafnero
- Dafni
- Damaskinia
- Dicheimarro
- Dilofo
- Dragasia
- Drepano
- Drosero
- Dryovouno

== E ==
- Elati
- Emporio
- Eratyra
- Ermakia
- Exochi

== F ==
- Foufas

== G ==
- Galateia
- Galatini
- Goules

== I ==
- Imera

== K ==
- Kaisareia
- Kalamia
- Kaloneri
- Kapnochori
- Kardia
- Karyditsa
- Karyochori
- Kastania
- Katafygio
- Kato Komi
- Kerasea
- Kipos
- Kleisoreia
- Kleitos
- Koila
- Koilada
- Koiladi
- Komanos
- Komnina
- Kontovouni
- Koryfi
- Kozani (City)
- Kranidia
- Kremasti
- Krimini
- Krokos
- Kteni

== L ==
- Lefkadi
- Lefkadia
- Lefkara
- Lefkopigi
- Lefkothea
- Lefkovrysi
- Leventis
- Liknades
- Livadero
- Livera
- Loukomi
- Louvri
- Lygeri

== M ==
- Mavrodendri
- Mavropigi
- Mesiani
- Mesolongos
- Mesovouno
- Metamorfosi
- Metaxas
- Mikrokastro
- Mikrovalto
- Milea
- Milochori
- Molocha
- Morfi

== N ==
- Namata
- Nea Nikopoli
- Neapoli
- Neraida

== O ==
- Oinoi
- Olympiada
- Omali

== P ==
- Palaiokastro
- Panareti
- Pelekanos
- Pentalofos
- Pentavrysos
- Peponia
- Perdikkas
- Peristera
- Petrana
- Plakida
- Platania
- Platanorrevma
- Polyfyto
- Polykastano
- Polylakko
- Polymylos
- Polyrracho
- Pontokomi
- Proastio
- Profitis Ilias
- Protochori
- Ptelea
- Pteleonas
- Ptolemaida
- Pylorio
- Pyrgoi
- Pyrgos

== R ==
- Rodiani
- Roditis
- Rodochori
- Ryaki
- Rymnio

== S ==
- Servia
- Siatista
- Sideras
- Simantro
- Sisani
- Skalochori
- Skiti
- Sparto
- Spilia
- Stavrodromi
- Sterna

== T ==
- Tetralofo
- Thymaria
- Tranovalto
- Trapezitsa
- Trigoniko
- Tsotyli

== V ==
- Vatero
- Vathylakkos
- Velanidia
- Velventos
- Vlasti
- Voskochori
- Vouchorina
- Vronti
- Vythos

== X ==
- Xirolimni

== Z ==
- Zoni
- Zoodochos Pigi

== See also ==
- List of towns and villages in Greece
