= Kleisoreia =

Kleisoreia Κλεισώρεια
- Community
- Location within Greece
- Coordinates: 40°19.287′N 21°10.578′E
- Country: Greece
- Administrative region: Western Macedonia
- Regional unit: Kozani
- Municipality: Voio
- Municipal unit: Tsotyli
- Elevation: 870 m (2,850 ft)

Population (2021)
  - Community: 35
- Time zone: UTC+2 (EET)
  - Summer (DST): UTC+3 (EEST)
- Postal code: 500 02
- Area code: +30-2468
- Vehicle registration: ΚΖ

Kleisoreia (Greek: Κλεισώρεια, before 1927: Τραπαντούστιον – Trapantoustion), is a village and a community of the Voio municipality in Western Macedonia, Greece. Before the 2011 local government reform it was part of the municipality of Tsotyli, of which it was a municipal district. The 2021 census recorded 35 inhabitants in the village.

According to the statistics of Vasil Kanchov ("Macedonia, Ethnography and Statistics"), 237 Greek Christians lived in the village in 1900.

Trapantoustion was a mixed village and a part of its population were Greek speaking Muslim Vallahades. The 1920 Greek census recorded 267 people in the village. Following the Greek–Turkish population exchange, Greek refugee families in Trapantoustion were from Pontus (10) in 1926. The 1928 Greek census recorded 211 village inhabitants. In 1928, the refugee families numbered 9 (31 people).

== See also ==
- List of settlements in the Kozani regional unit
