= Kleitos, Kozani =

Kleitos Κλείτος
- Community
- Location within Greece
- Coordinates: 40°15.35′N 21°44.3′E
- Country: Greece
- Administrative region: West Macedonia
- Regional unit: Kozani
- Municipality: Kozani
- Municipal unit: Ellispontos

Area
  - Community: 24.048 km^{2} (9.285 sq mi)
- Elevation: 705 m (2,313 ft)

Population (2021)
  - Community: 374
  - Density: 15.6/km^{2} (40.3/sq mi)
- Time zone: UTC+2 (EET)
  - Summer (DST): UTC+3 (EEST)
- Postal code: 501 50
- Area code: +30-2461
- Vehicle registration: ΚΖ

Kleitos (Greek: Κλείτος) is a village and a community of the Kozani municipality. Before the 2011 local government reform it was part of the municipality of Ellispontos, of which it was a municipal district. The 2021 census recorded 374 inhabitants in the village. The community of Kleitos covers an area of 24.048 km^{2}.

== History ==
Kleitos settlement has been relocated to the current location due to the lignite mines' of the Public Power Corporation of Greece expansion towards the original settlement. The original settlement was located 3 km west of Akrini.

== See also ==
- List of settlements in the Kozani regional unit
