= Stavrodromi, Kozani =

Stavrodromi Σταυροδρόμι
- Community
- Location within Greece
- Coordinates: 40°18.388′N 21°15.5′E
- Country: Greece
- Administrative region: Western Macedonia
- Regional unit: Kozani
- Municipality: Voio
- Municipal unit: Tsotyli
- Elevation: 710 m (2,330 ft)

Population (2021)
  - Community: 42
- Time zone: UTC+2 (EET)
  - Summer (DST): UTC+3 (EEST)
- Postal code: 500 02
- Area code: +30-2468
- Vehicle registration: ΚΖ

Stavrodromi (Greek: Σταυροδρόμι, before 1928: Πλαζουμίστα – Plazoumista), is a village and a community of the Voio municipality. Before the 2011 local government reform it was part of the municipality of Tsotyli, of which it was a municipal district. The 2021 census recorded 42 inhabitants in the village.

Plazoumista was populated by Greek speaking Muslim Vallahades. The 1920 Greek census recorded 294 people in the village, and 250 inhabitants (60 families) were Muslim in 1923. Following the Greek–Turkish population exchange, Greek refugee families in Plazoumista were from Pontus (66) in 1926. The 1928 Greek census recorded 196 village inhabitants. In 1928, the refugee families numbered 66 (233 people).

== See also ==
- List of settlements in the Kozani regional unit
