= Simantro =

Simantro Σήμαντρο
- Community
- Location within Greece
- Coordinates: 40°23.2295′N 21°19.4245′E
- Country: Greece
- Administrative region: Western Macedonia
- Regional unit: Kozani
- Municipality: Voio
- Municipal unit: Neapoli
- Elevation: 770 m (2,530 ft)

Population (2021)
  - Community: 29
- Time zone: UTC+2 (EET)
  - Summer (DST): UTC+3 (EEST)
- Postal code: 500 01
- Area code: +30-2468
- Vehicle registration: ΚΖ

Simantro (Greek: Σήμαντρο, before 1927: Λαμπάνοβον – Lampanovon), is a village and a community of the Voio municipality. Before the 2011 local government reform it was part of the municipality of Neapoli, of which it was a municipal district. The 2021 census recorded 29 inhabitants in the village.

Lampanovon was a mixed village and a part of its population were Greek speaking Muslim Vallahades. The 1920 Greek census recorded 186 people in the village, and 180 inhabitants (35 families) were Muslim in 1923. Following the Greek–Turkish population exchange, Greek refugee families in Lampanovon were from Pontus (49) in 1926. The 1928 Greek census recorded 141 village inhabitants. In 1928, the refugee families numbered 46 (172 people).
