= Vythos =

Vythos Βυθὀς
- Community
- Location within Greece
- Coordinates: 40°16′N 21°19′E
- Country: Greece
- Administrative region: Western Macedonia
- Regional unit: Kozani
- Municipality: Voio
- Municipal unit: Pentalofos

Population (2021)
  - Community: 72
- Time zone: UTC+2 (EET)
  - Summer (DST): UTC+3 (EEST)
- Vehicle registration: KZ

Vythos (Greek: Βυθὀς, before 1927: Ντόλος – Ntolos), is a village in Kozani regional unit, Western Macedonia, Greece. Since the 2011 local government reform it is part of the municipality Voio, of which it is a member of the municipality unit of Pentalofos. Βυθὀς means seabed, which is a paradoxical name for a village typified by its mountainous terrain and high altitude.

People from Vythos are called Vythiotes or Dolianates.

== Topography ==
Vythos is built at an altitude of 1035 metres, in one of the most steep and isolated areas of Voio, into the arms of the mountain. The village is nestled in a steep ravine and surrounded by the dense germination of the Siupotista chestnut forest. The falls of Skotomeno Nero is situated in the forest besides Mavri Rahi or Mavriaha, a mountain chain which bonds Vythos to the peak of Prophet Ilias, through old macadam roads. This mountain world is dominated by towering beech, oak, chestnut and pine trees. Behind Mavriaha, following the big crest of the mountain, at an altitude of 1784 metres, is Petritsi - the third highest and most imposing peak of Voio.

The lower part of Vythos is 1 kilometre from the adjacent village of Pentalofos and the upper part is situated under the huge rocks of Karaouli, or Mopunr Skopos, which overhangs at a height of 200 metres. This mountain is included in the record program of special sceneries of the National Technical University of Athens.

Vythos lies in mountainous terrain, and no other village in Voio is built in such a remote, rugged location. The surrounding mountains hide most of the village, and only a small part of it can be seen, from the village of Koryfi in the Tsotyli area.

=== Springs ===
Vythos has by analogy, the most springs due to the many steep mountains that surround the village. The water that comes down from the chestnut forest of “Sioust” is so plentiful that the bigger spring has two pipes in order to best serve the inhabitants. The “Mpnaria” spring is located at the nether Vythos. The “Magianadiko”, “Doumousiariko”, “Giouradiko Mpnari” and “Kerasoftades” springs are situated in the upper part of the village and flow from Karaouli. At the centre of the two quarters, near the village school building is the “Pigadouli” spring. and a little bit further by the village. The “Stavros”, or “Agioneri”, spring can be found on the road that leads to the Monastery of Aghia Triada.

== Population ==
Vythos is big in amplitude and used to have around 800 residents. Like many villages in Greece, Vythos has experienced significant urban drift as people move to the city where employment is more plentiful. Significant residents migrated overseas, most prolifically in the period 1940 - 1970, and primarily to New Zealand, Australia and the United States of America.

Nowadays, 180 residents keep the village alive during the tough winter months, while in August the residents are more than 350 as expat villagers, from throughout Greece and overseas, return to their family homes for the summer holidays.

== History ==
Although it is not known when Vythos was first settled local tradition dates the village’s establishment between 1600 and 1620. The village's first inhabitants were farming families, including families from the old village of “Iskiodolos” (situated at the eastern of Vythos, near the church of the Archangels). About the years 1630–1640 the central part of the village was built by farming families from the old village of “Fteri” (at the foot of Ailias, near “Paliomonastiro”). Around 1700 - 1720 the eastern settlement was built by families resettling from the old villages of “Calogritsa” and Zaltsi” (placed behind Karaouli). Between 1720 and 1740, the highest settlement was constructed by families evicted from the “Cerasovo” of Epirus. Later, people from the destroyed village of “Paliocrimini”, from Cipseli and Souli, settled there. The people who moved from the old villages took to this wild ravine, in order to be able to resist effectually the incursions of the conquerors. Saint Kosmas, Kosmas of Aetolia, passed through this region in the summer of 1777.

According to old manuscripts, Dolos is mentioned as a quarter of the large village of Zoupani. In 1884, after the actions of the doctor Cosmas Agacidis, Dolos became an independent community.

On the 4th of July 1944 much of the village was burnt by the German army. Most residents fled with their livestock and hid in the hills.

== Architecture ==
The architecture of Vythos is typical of the stone architecture found throughout Voio.

=== Houses ===
Houses are built with apparent stones, wooden windows and doors and wooden house-tops covered by stone tiles. They are mounted on the sides of the mountains, so perfectly fitted in the areas anaglyph as if they were part of the natural scenery. They are not just ground floor buildings, but also houses of two or three floors with patterns that served the residents needs through their everyday living.

The cornerstones underline the outline of the buildings. The characteristic slabs placed on the corners of the buildings on which are chiseled the date of development, the figure of the owner or the master builder or even sacred symbols are there to protect the house and the residents from evil. The buildings are completed by their yards, which are demarcated by high stone fences and characteristic wooden garden doors. The garden doors are decorated in interesting designs with big fat pins, and they have their one protective roof made by wooden frame and slates.

=== Church ===
The central church of Vythos is dedicated to the presentation of the Virgin Mary. The church was at this location from 1600, when the village was first established, as well as the small church of Agioi Anargyroi. The small church was burned by the Germans, but afterwards rebuilt and incorporated into the main church. The construction of the church started in the middle of the 18th century and was completed at the beginning of the 19th century. It was burned in 1944, but soon enough it was renovated. The church is celebrated on 21 November each year.

=== Guest House ===
The village operates a traditional guest house that can accommodate 11 people in 4 rooms.

=== School Building ===
The stone school building was built in 1920. During its acme period it had more than 200 students. The school was rebuilt in 1950 by the Society of the Emigrants to America after it was burned by the Axis occupation of Germans during World War II. The school was permanently closed in 1985, due to lack of students. Today the school building houses a National Resistance museum and a folkloric collection.

=== Bridges ===
Three beautiful small stone-made bridges are preserved in Vythos. “Leno’s bridge”, was originally built to connect residents of the upper quarter and the nether quarter of the village, through the “Sioust” chestnut forest. Today it forms part of the trekking path “The Journey of the River Promoritsa”, which begins from the “Monastery” and ends up to the stone-made bridges of Morfi.

“Koukoutsili’s bridge” is located at the nether Vythos, descending from the well “Bnari”. Larger than "Leno's bridge" it connects the two sides of the “Karaouli” stream, which often becomes rapid during the heavy winter and spring rains. It mainly serves the residents of upper Vythos to get to Pentalofos, the wells and the gardens that they kept near the stream.

The biggest of the three bridges, is also at the nether Vythos and is used to serve the daily movements from and towards Pentalofos. The stream bed descends from the chestnut forest “Sioust” and as it is wider due to the soft ground, it results in a bigger bridge arch.

=== Village Square ===
The village square, Marmaros, was constructed in 1937. Community offices and a cafe were built adjacent to the square in 1971.

=== Monastery ===
The Greek Orthodox monastery of Aghia Triada (Holy Trinity), built in 1792, is situated on the outskirts of Vythos. The Monastery's church which is built with carved stones is a splendid example of the building architecture of Voio. It is famous for its nonesuch Athonic type sanctum and its marvelous icon murals. The monastery is able to accommodate 100 persons.

== Heritage ==
The Cultural Society of Vythos was established in 1965 by the locals. Its aims are to maintain the customs of Vythos, its architecture, the cobbled roads and the country churches. It organizes cultural events. The Society also works to maintain a relationship between the village's permanent inhabitants and the village's diaspora. The Society's offices are located in the village square, the “Marmaros”, and is endowed with collections of traditional tools, old photographs and books donated by the inhabitants of the village.

In 2007 Vythos was featured on an episode of the ERT3 television series O topos kai to tragoudi tou.
