= Dicheimarro =

Dicheimarro Διχείμαρρο
- Community
- Location within Greece
- Coordinates: 40.307°N 21.232°E
- Country: Greece
- Administrative region: Western Macedonia
- Regional unit: Kozani
- Municipality: Voio
- Municipal unit: Tsotyli

Population (2021)
  - Community: 40
- Time zone: UTC+2 (EET)
  - Summer (DST): UTC+3 (EEST)

Dicheimarro (Greek: Διχείμαρρο, before 1928: Ρέντα – Renta), is a community in the municipal unit of Tsotyli, western Kozani regional unit, itself in the Greek region of Macedonia.

Michael Kalinderis lists Renta as populated by Greek speaking Muslim Vallahades. The 1920 Greek census recorded 277 people in the village, and 200 inhabitants (40 families) were Muslim in 1923. Following the Greek–Turkish population exchange, Greek refugee families in Renta were from Asia Minor (17) and Pontus (18) in 1926. The 1928 Greek census recorded 162 village inhabitants. In 1928, the refugee families numbered 34 (135 people).
