= Molocha, Kozani =

Molocha Μολόχα
- Community
- Location within Greece
- Coordinates: 40°21.752′N 21°21.25′E
- Country: Greece
- Administrative region: Western Macedonia
- Regional unit: Kozani
- Municipality: Voio
- Municipal unit: Neapoli
- Elevation: 700 m (2,300 ft)

Population (2021)
  - Community: 89
- Time zone: UTC+2 (EET)
  - Summer (DST): UTC+3 (EEST)
- Postal code: 500 01
- Area code: +30-2468
- Vehicle registration: ΚΖ

Molocha (Greek: Μολόχα, before 1927: Γκινόσιον – Gkinosion), is a village and a community of the Voio municipality. Before the 2011 local government reform it was part of the municipality of Neapoli, of which it was a municipal district. The 2021 census recorded 89 inhabitants in the village.

Gkinosion was populated by Greek speaking Muslim Vallahades. The 1920 Greek census recorded 249 people in the village, and 250 inhabitants (50 families) were Muslim in 1923. Following the Greek–Turkish population exchange, Greek refugee families in Gkinosion were from Pontus (73) in 1926. The 1928 Greek census recorded 226 village inhabitants. In 1928, the refugee families numbered 72 (240 people). The village mosque was demolished and the church of Agios Athanasios was constructed at the site.
