= Karyochori =

Karyochori Καρυοχώρι
- Community
- Location within Greece
- Coordinates: 40°30.2′N 21°46.6′E
- Country: Greece
- Administrative region: West Macedonia
- Regional unit: Kozani
- Municipality: Eordaia
- Municipal unit: Agia Paraskevi
- Elevation: 710 m (2,330 ft)

Population (2021)
  - Community: 349
- Time zone: UTC+2 (EET)
  - Summer (DST): UTC+3 (EEST)
- Postal code: 502 00
- Area code: 24630
- Vehicle registration: KZ

Karyochori (Greek: Καρυοχώρι meaning walnut village, before 1927: Κοζλούκιοϊ - Kozloukioi) is a village in the municipal unit of Agia Paraskevi in the Kozani regional unit, northern Greece. Karyochori is built in a valley at the elevation of 710 m above sea level. It is located 2 km southeast of Agios Christoforos, 8 km east of Ptolemaida and 22 km north of Kozani. There are large open-pit lignite mines to the south and west of Karyochori, and farmlands to the north.

== Historical population ==
Historical population
Year	Pop.	±%
1981	678	—
1991	634	−6.5%
2001	514	−18.9%
2011	431	−16.1%
2021	349	−19.0%

== See also ==
- List of settlements in the Kozani regional unit
