= Louvri =

Village in Greece

Louvri Λούβρη
- Community
- Location within Greece
- Coordinates: 40°14.1′N 21°17.25′E
- Country: Greece
- Administrative region: Western Macedonia
- Regional unit: Kozani
- Municipality: Voio
- Municipal unit: Tsotyli
- Elevation: 750 m (2,460 ft)

Population (2021)
  - Community: 49
- Time zone: UTC+2 (EET)
  - Summer (DST): UTC+3 (EEST)
- Postal code: 500 02
- Area code: +30-2468
- Vehicle registration: ΚΖ

Louvri (Greek: Λούβρη) is a village and a community of the Voio municipality. Prior to the 2011 local government reform it was part of the municipality of Tsotyli, of which it was a municipal district. At the 2021 census, there were 49 individuals recorded as living in the village.

== See also ==
- List of settlements in the Kozani regional unit
