= Trapezitsa =

Trapezitsa Τραπεζίτσα
- Community
- Location within Greece
- Coordinates: 40°14′39″N 21°27′32″E
- Country: Greece
- Administrative region: Western Macedonia
- Regional unit: Kozani
- Municipality: Voio
- Municipal unit: Neapoli

Area
  - Community: 10.275 km^{2} (3.967 sq mi)
- Elevation: 554 m (1,818 ft)

Population (2021)
  - Community: 76
  - Density: 7.4/km^{2} (19/sq mi)
- Time zone: UTC+2 (EET)
  - Summer (DST): UTC+3 (EEST)
- Postal code: 500 01
- Area code: +30-2468
- Vehicle registration: ΚΖ

Trapezitsa (Greek: Τραπεζίτσα) is a village and a community of the Voio municipality in Greece. Before the 2011 local government reform, it was part of the municipality of Neapoli, of which it was a municipal district. The 2021 census recorded 76 inhabitants in the community of Trapezitsa. The community of Trapezitsa covers an area of 10.275 km^{2}.

== Administrative division ==
The community of Trapezitsa consists of two separate settlements:

- Panareti (population 14 in 2021)
- Trapezitsa (population 62)

== See also ==
- List of settlements in the Kozani regional unit
