= Peponia, Kozani =

Peponia Πεπονιά
- Community
- Location within Greece
- Coordinates: 40°17.5667′N 21°24.582′E
- Country: Greece
- Administrative region: Western Macedonia
- Regional unit: Kozani
- Municipality: Voio
- Municipal unit: Neapoli
- Elevation: 600 m (2,000 ft)

Population (2021)
  - Community: 48
- Time zone: UTC+2 (EET)
  - Summer (DST): UTC+3 (EEST)
- Postal code: 500 01
- Area code: +30-2468
- Vehicle registration: ΚΖ

Peponia (Greek: Πεπονιά, before 1927: Λάη – Lai), is a village and a community of the Voio municipality. Before the 2011 local government reform it was part of the municipality of Neapoli, of which it was a municipal district. The 2021 census recorded 48 inhabitants in the village.

Lai was populated by Greek speaking Muslim Vallahades. In the 1900 statistics of Vasil Kanchov, where the town appears under its Bulgarian name "Laya", it was inhabited by 300 Greek Muslims.

The 1920 Greek census recorded 321 people in the village, and 250 inhabitants (60 families) were Muslim in 1923. Following the Greek–Turkish population exchange, Greek refugee families in Lai were from East Thrace (26), Asia Minor (4) and Pontus (60) in 1926. The 1928 Greek census recorded 338 village inhabitants. In 1928, the refugee families numbered 88 (323 people).
