= Mesolongos =

Mesolongos Μεσόλογγος
- Community
- Location within Greece
- Coordinates: 40°19.735′N 21°14.73′E
- Country: Greece
- Administrative region: Western Macedonia
- Regional unit: Kozani
- Municipality: Voio
- Municipal unit: Neapoli
- Elevation: 760 m (2,490 ft)

Population (2021)
  - Community: 11
- Time zone: UTC+2 (EET)
  - Summer (DST): UTC+3 (EEST)
- Postal code: 500 01
- Area code: +30-2468
- Vehicle registration: ΚΖ

Mesolongos (Greek: Μεσόλογγος, before 1927: Μεσολογγόστι – Mesolongosti), is a village and a community of the Voio municipality. Before the 2011 local government reform, it was part of the municipality of Neapoli, of which it was a municipal district. The 2021 census recorded 11 inhabitants in the village.

Mesolongosti was a mixed village and a part of its population were Greek speaking Muslim Vallahades. The 1920 Greek census recorded 429 people in the village, and 150 inhabitants (26 families) were Muslim in 1923. Following the Greek–Turkish population exchange, Greek refugee families in Mesolongosti were from Asia Minor (7) and Pontus (22) in 1926. The 1928 Greek census recorded 337 village inhabitants. In 1928, the refugee families numbered 29 (101 people).
