= Agioi Anargyroi, Kozani =

Agioi Anargyroi Άγιοι Ανάργυροι
- Community
- Location within Greece
- Coordinates: 40°16′41″N 21°10′16″E
- Country: Greece
- Administrative region: Western Macedonia
- Regional unit: Kozani
- Municipality: Voio
- Municipal unit: Tsotyli

Population (2021)
  - Community: 16
- Time zone: UTC+2 (EET)
  - Summer (DST): UTC+3 (EEST)

Agioi Anargyroi (Greek: Άγιοι Ανάργυροι, before 1927: Βρόστιανη – Vrostiani), is a village in the municipal unit of Tsotyli, Kozani regional unit, Greece.

Vrostiani was populated by Greek speaking Muslim Vallahades. The 1920 Greek census recorded 286 people in the village, and 280 inhabitants (40 families) were Muslim in 1923. Following the Greek–Turkish population exchange, Greek refugee families in Vrostiani were from Asia Minor (1) and Pontus (45) in 1926. The 1928 Greek census recorded 178 village inhabitants. In 1928, the refugee families numbered 46 (182 people).
