= Cheimerino =

Cheimerino Χειμερινό
- Community
- Location within Greece
- Coordinates: 40°20′24″N 21°22′30″E
- Country: Greece
- Administrative region: Western Macedonia
- Regional unit: Kozani
- Municipality: Voio
- Municipal unit: Neapoli

Population (2021)
  - Community: 44
- Time zone: UTC+2 (EET)
  - Summer (DST): UTC+3 (EEST)

Cheimerino (Greek: Χειμερινό, before 1927: Βάιπες – Vaipes), is a small village near Neapoli in the Kozani regional unit, Greece. It is a community of the municipality of Voio. Population 44 (2021). It is situated on the west bank of the Aliakmon river, which is the longest river in Greece.

Michael Kalinderis lists Vaipes as populated by Greek speaking Muslim Vallahades. The 1920 Greek census recorded 361 people in the village, and 180 inhabitants (40 families) were Muslim in 1923. Following the Greek–Turkish population exchange, Greek refugee families in Vaipes were from East Thrace (5), Asia Minor (35) and Pontus (22) in 1926. The 1928 Greek census recorded 217 village inhabitants. In 1928, the refugee families numbered 61 (216 people).
