= Asproula =

Asproula Ασπρούλα
- Community
- Location within Greece
- Coordinates: 40°20′06″N 21°17′18″E
- Country: Greece
- Administrative region: Western Macedonia
- Regional unit: Kozani
- Municipality: Voio
- Municipal unit: Neapoli

Population (2021)
  - Community: 92
- Time zone: UTC+2 (EET)
  - Summer (DST): UTC+3 (EEST)
- Postal code: 50001
- Area code: +30 2468

Asproula (Greek: Ασπρούλα, before 1927: Βελίστη – Velisti), is a village in the Kozani regional unit, Greece. It is situated at an altitude of 744 meters above sea level. The population was 92 at the 2021 census.

Velisti was a mixed village and a part of its population were Greek speaking Muslim Vallahades. The 1920 Greek census recorded 289 people in the village, and 250 inhabitants (30 families) were Muslim in 1923. Following the Greek–Turkish population exchange, Greek refugee families in Velisti were from Asia Minor (1) and Pontus (29) in 1926. The 1928 Greek census recorded 281 village inhabitants. In 1928, the refugee families numbered 30 (104 people).
