= Aliakmonas, Kozani =

Aliakmonas Αλιάκμονας
- Community
- Location within Greece
- Coordinates: 40°19′04″N 21°25′49″E
- Country: Greece
- Administrative region: Western Macedonia
- Regional unit: Kozani
- Municipality: Voio
- Municipal unit: Neapoli

Population (2021)
  - Community: 126
- Time zone: UTC+2 (EET)
  - Summer (DST): UTC+3 (EEST)

Aliakmonas (Greek: Αλιάκμονας, before 1927: Βρατίνιον – Vratinon, between 1927 and 1960: Παλιούριον – Paliourion), is a Greek village located in the municipality of Voio, in the regional unit of Kozani. It is located on the left bank of its namesake, the River Aliakmon. A formerly independent community, it became part of the municipality of Neapoli in 1997, and of the municipality of Voio in 2010.

At an altitude of 550 meters, Aliakmonas is the lowest village in Voio. Views include the Tymfi mountains, Smolikas, Voio, and Grammos. To the northeast, it provides views of the Askio mountain range. There are fertile plains in the valley of Aliakmonas River. The area produces tobacco and wheat.

A folklore museum, housed in the old village school, was founded in 2009.

== History ==
Archaeological digs near Aliakmonas have uncovered a few notable specimens. A statue of Aphrodite by the Greek sculptor Scopa (4th Century BC), for example, was discovered in a nearby settlement, where an early Christian mosaic floor was also uncovered. Coins, ceramics, statues, mosaics, floors were found near there.

The village (under the name Vratini) was mentioned in writing as early as 1534 AD, in the code of Zavorda. The name was changed to Paliourion in 1927, and subsequently to Aliakmonas in 1960. Statistical reporting in the early 20th century referred to the settlement as a Greek village in the sanjak Servia with a population of 400; if immediately surrounding settlements are included, the total population may have amounted to 750.
