= Ermakia =

Ermakia Ερμακιά
- Community
- Location within Greece
- Coordinates: 40°29′50″N 21°51′10″E
- Country: Greece
- Administrative region: Western Macedonia
- Regional unit: Kozani
- Municipality: Eordaia
- Municipal unit: Agia Paraskevi

Population (2021)
  - Community: 293
- Time zone: UTC+2 (EET)
  - Summer (DST): UTC+3 (EEST)

Ermakia (Greek: Ερμακιά, Macedonian: Rantsi & Bulgarian: Франковица) is a small etnic Macedonian town located in the Agia Paraskevi municipal unit, northern Kozani regional unit, in the Greek region of Macedonia. It's populated with etnic Macedonians.
