= Vouchorina =

Vouchorina Βουχωρίνα
- Community
- Location within Greece
- Coordinates: 40°13.191′N 21°15.5′E
- Country: Greece
- Administrative region: Western Macedonia
- Regional unit: Kozani
- Municipality: Voio
- Municipal unit: Tsotyli
- Elevation: 760 m (2,490 ft)

Population (2021)
  - Community: 32
- Time zone: UTC+2 (EET)
  - Summer (DST): UTC+3 (EEST)
- Postal code: 500 02
- Area code: +30-2468
- Vehicle registration: ΚΖ

Vouchorina (Greek: Βουχωρίνα) is a village and a community of the Voio municipality. Before the 2011 local government reform it was part of the municipality of Tsotyli, of which it was a municipal district. The 2021 census recorded 32 inhabitants in the village.
