= Kaisareia, Kozani =

Village in Western Macedonia, Greece

Kaisareia Καισάρεια
- Community
- Location within Greece
- Coordinates: 40°10′15″N 21°51′54″E
- Country: Greece
- Administrative region: Western Macedonia
- Regional unit: Kozani
- Municipality: Kozani
- Municipal unit: Elimeia

Area
  - Community: 16.328 km^{2} (6.304 sq mi)
- Elevation: 335 m (1,099 ft)

Population (2021)
  - Community: 611
  - Density: 37.4/km^{2} (96.9/sq mi)
- Time zone: UTC+2 (EET)
  - Summer (DST): UTC+3 (EEST)
- Postal code: 500 10
- Area code: +30-2461
- Vehicle registration: ΚΖ

Kaisareia (Greek: Καισάρεια) is a village and a community in the Kozani municipality of Western Macedonia, Greece. Before the 2011 local government reform it was part of the municipality of Elimeia, of which it was a municipal district. The community of Kaisareia covers an area of 16.328 km^{2} and has a population of 611 according to the 2021 census.

== Administrative division ==
The community of Kaisareia consists of two separate settlements:

- Kaisareia (population 499 in 2021)
- Kipos (population 112)

== See also ==
List of settlements in the Kozani regional unit
