= Kontovouni =

Kontovouni Κοντοβούνι
- Community
- Location within Greece
- Coordinates: 40°12.66′N 21°52.958′E
- Country: Greece
- Administrative region: West Macedonia
- Regional unit: Kozani
- Municipality: Kozani
- Municipal unit: Elimeia

Area
  - Community: 5.226 km^{2} (2.018 sq mi)
- Elevation: 368 m (1,207 ft)

Population (2021)
  - Community: 99
  - Density: 19/km^{2} (49/sq mi)
- Time zone: UTC+2 (EET)
  - Summer (DST): UTC+3 (EEST)
- Postal code: 500 10
- Area code: +30-2461
- Vehicle registration: ΚΖ

Kontovouni (Greek: Κοντοβούνι) is a village and a community in the Kozani municipality. Before the 2011 local government reform, it was part of the municipality of Elimeia, of which it was a municipal district. The 2021 census recorded 99 inhabitants in the community of Kontovouni. The community of Kontovouni covers an area of 5.226 km^{2}.

== Administrative division ==
The community of Kontovouni consists of two separate settlements:

- Kontovouni (population 33 in 2021)
- Pyrgos (population 66)

== See also ==
- List of settlements in the Kozani regional unit
