= Peristera, Kozani =

Peristera Περιστέρα
- Community
- Location within Greece
- Coordinates: 40°17.1′N 21°21.4′E
- Country: Greece
- Administrative region: Western Macedonia
- Regional unit: Kozani
- Municipality: Voio
- Municipal unit: Neapoli
- Elevation: 700 m (2,300 ft)

Population (2021)
  - Community: 14
- Time zone: UTC+2 (EET)
  - Summer (DST): UTC+3 (EEST)
- Postal code: 500 01
- Area code: +30-2468
- Vehicle registration: ΚΖ

Peristera (Greek: Περιστέρα, before 1927: Μαρτίτσιον – Martitsion), is a village and a community of the Voio municipality. Before the 2011 local government reform it was part of the municipality of Neapoli, of which it was a municipal district. The 2021 census recorded 14 inhabitants in the village.

The 1920 Greek census recorded 258 people in the village. Following the Greek–Turkish population exchange, Greek refugee families in Martitsion were from East Thrace (1) and Asia Minor (1) in 1926. The 1928 Greek census recorded 256 village inhabitants. In 1928, the refugee families numbered 2 (8 people).
