= Aidonochori =

Aidonochori Αηδονοχώρι
- Community
- Location within Greece
- Coordinates: 40°18′40″N 21°21′30″E
- Country: Greece
- Administrative region: Western Macedonia
- Regional unit: Kozani
- Municipality: Voio
- Municipal unit: Neapoli

Population (2021)
  - Community: 39
- Time zone: UTC+2 (EET)
  - Summer (DST): UTC+3 (EEST)
- Postal code: 50001
- Area code: +30 2468

Aidonochori (Greek: Αηδονοχώρι) is a village and community located in the Neapoli municipal unit, situated in western Kozani regional unit, in Greece.

Aidonochori is situated at an altitude of 720 meters above sea level. At the 2021 census, the population was 39.

The 1920 Greek census recorded 181 people in the village. Following the Greek–Turkish population exchange, Greek refugee families in Aidonochori were from Asia Minor (1) in 1926. The 1928 Greek census recorded 131 village inhabitants. In 1928, the refugee families numbered 1 (3 people).
