= Voskochori =

Voskochori Βοσκοχώρι
- Community
- Location within Greece
- Coordinates: 40°22.9245′N 22°0.4425′E
- Country: Greece
- Administrative region: West Macedonia
- Regional unit: Kozani
- Municipality: Kozani
- Municipal unit: Ellispontos

Area
  - Community: 25.099 km^{2} (9.691 sq mi)
- Elevation: 770 m (2,530 ft)

Population (2021)
  - Community: 85
  - Density: 3.4/km^{2} (8.8/sq mi)
- Time zone: UTC+2 (EET)
  - Summer (DST): UTC+3 (EEST)
- Postal code: 501 50
- Area code: +30-2461
- Vehicle registration: ΚΖ

Voskochori (Greek: Βοσκοχώρι) is a village and a community of the Kozani municipality. Before the 2011 local government reform it was part of the municipality of Ellispontos, of which it was a municipal district. The 2021 census recorded 85 inhabitants in the community. The community of Voskochori covers an area of 25.099 km^{2}.

== See also ==
List of settlements in the Kozani regional unit
