= Exochi, Kozani =

Exochi Εξοχή
- Community
- Location within Greece
- Coordinates: 40°20.358′N 21°47.294′E
- Country: Greece
- Administrative region: West Macedonia
- Regional unit: Kozani
- Municipality: Kozani
- Municipal unit: Kozani

Area
  - Community: 16.92 km^{2} (6.53 sq mi)
- Elevation: 820 m (2,690 ft)

Population (2021)
  - Community: 122
  - Density: 7.21/km^{2} (18.7/sq mi)
- Time zone: UTC+2 (EET)
  - Summer (DST): UTC+3 (EEST)
- Postal code: 501 50
- Area code: +30-2461
- Vehicle registration: ΚΖ

Exochi (Greek: Εξοχή) is a village and a community in the Kozani municipality. Before the 2011 local government reform, it was part of the municipality of Kozani, of which it was a municipal district. The 2021 census recorded 122 inhabitants in the community. The community of Exochi covers an area of 16.92 km^{2}.

== History ==
Before the Greco-Turkish population exchange the village, called Bairakli, was inhabited exclusively by Turks. After the population exchange the village was resettled by Greek refugees. The original settlement was evacuated in 1980, as the Public Power Corporation of Greece expanded its lignite mines towards the village. The contemporary settlement of Exochi is adjacent to the community of Koila.

== See also ==
- List of settlements in the Kozani regional unit
