= Dryovouno =

Dryovouno Δρυόβουνο
- Community
- Location within Greece
- Coordinates: 40°22.25′N 21°26.55′E
- Country: Greece
- Administrative region: Western Macedonia
- Regional unit: Kozani
- Municipality: Voio
- Municipal unit: Neapoli
- Elevation: 800 m (2,600 ft)

Population (2021)
  - Community: 211
- Time zone: UTC+2 (EET)
  - Summer (DST): UTC+3 (EEST)
- Postal code: 500 03
- Area code: +30-2465
- Vehicle registration: ΚΖ

Dryovouno (Greek: Δρυόβουνο, before 1927: Δρυάνοβο – Dryanovo), is a village and a community of the Voio municipality. Before the 2011 local government reform it was part of the municipality of Neapoli, of which it was a municipal district. The 2021 census recorded 211 inhabitants in the village.
