= Kato Komi =

Kato Komi Κάτω Κώμη
- Community
- Location within Greece
- Coordinates: 40°12.587′N 21°50.598′E
- Country: Greece
- Administrative region: West Macedonia
- Regional unit: Kozani
- Municipality: Kozani
- Municipal unit: Elimeia

Area
  - Community: 8.202 km^{2} (3.167 sq mi)
- Elevation: 400 m (1,300 ft)

Population (2021)
  - Community: 224
  - Density: 27.3/km^{2} (70.7/sq mi)
- Time zone: UTC+2 (EET)
  - Summer (DST): UTC+3 (EEST)
- Postal code: 500 10
- Area code: +30-2461
- Vehicle registration: ΚΖ

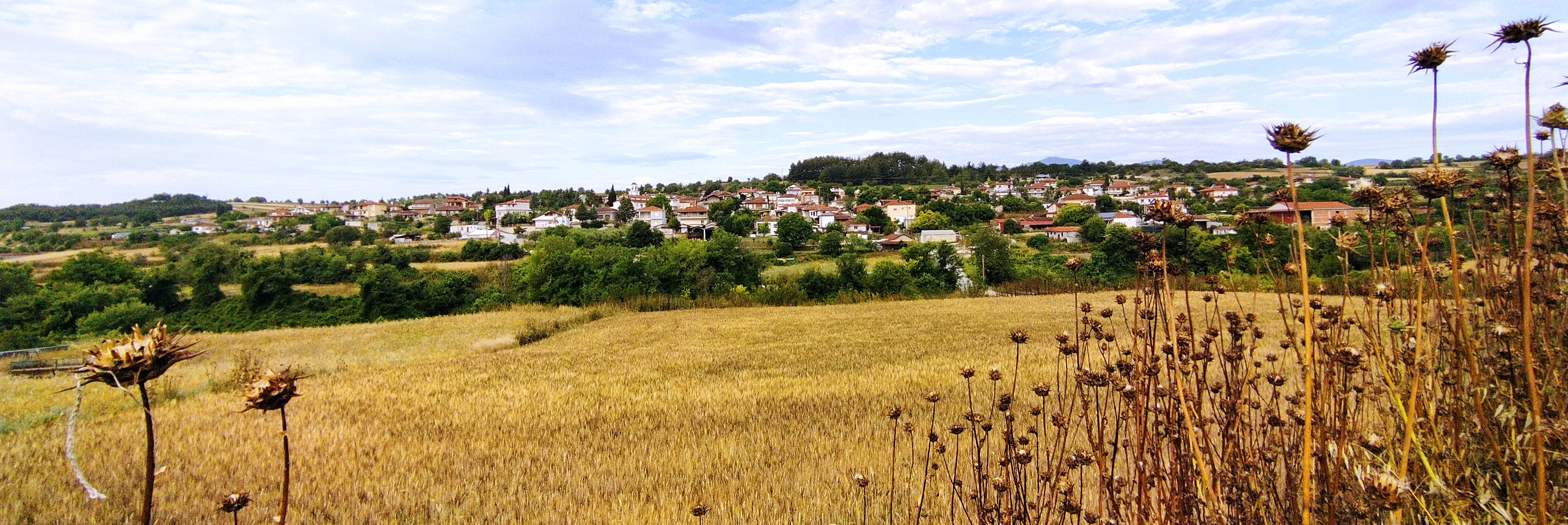
View of Kato Komi

Kato Komi (Greek: Κάτω Κώμη) is a village and a community of the Kozani municipality. Before the 2011 local government reform it was part of the municipality of Elimeia, of which it was a municipal district. The 2021 census recorded 224 inhabitants in the community. The community of Kato Komi covers an area of 8.202 km^{2}.

== See also ==
List of settlements in the Kozani regional unit
