= Exochi =

Exochi (Greek: Εξοχή meaning "countryside") may refer to several villages in Greece:

- Exochi, Achaea, a village in Achaea
- Exochi, Drama, a village in the municipality Kato Nevrokopi, Drama regional unit
- Exochi, Ioannina, a village in the Ioannina regional unit
- Exochi, Kavala, a village in the Kavala regional unit
- Exochi, Kozani, a village in the Kozani regional unit
- Exochi, Pieria, a village in Pieria
- Exochi, Thessaloniki, a village in the Thessaloniki regional unit
- Exochi, Xanthi, a village in the Xanthi regional unit
