= Axiokastro =

Axiokastro Αξιόκαστρο
- Community
- Location within Greece
- Coordinates: 40°15′43″N 21°24′36″E
- Country: Greece
- Administrative region: Western Macedonia
- Regional unit: Kozani
- Municipality: Voio
- Municipal unit: Neapoli

Population (2021)
  - Community: 60
- Time zone: UTC+2 (EET)
  - Summer (DST): UTC+3 (EEST)

Axiokastro (Greek: Αξιόκαστρο, before 1927: Σουρδάνιον – Sourdanion), is a village in the municipal unit of Neapoli, Kozani regional unit, Greece. Its population in 2021 was 60.
