= Goutas =

Goutas is a surname. Notable people with the surname include:

- Dimitrios Goutas (born 1994), Greek footballer
- Stergios Goutas, Greek chieftain
