= Stergios Goutas =

Greek chieftain during the Greek Struggle for Macedonia

Kapetan (Chieftain) Stergios Goutas
- Native name: Στέργιος Γκούτας
- Born: c. 1870s Mesolouri, [Monastir Vilayet]], Ottoman Empire (now Greece)
- Died: 4–6 March 1913 Bizani, Janina Vilayet, Ottoman Empire (now Greece)
- Allegiance: Kingdom of Greece
- Branch: HMC; Hellenic Army
- Service years: 1904–1913
- Conflicts: Macedonian Struggle; Balkan Wars: First Balkan War; Battle of Bizani †

Stergios Goutas (Greek: Στέργιος Γκούτας) was a Greek chieftain of the Macedonian Struggle.

== Biography ==
Goutas was born in 1870s in Mesolouri of Grevena. He was the son of Klepht Konstantinos Goutas and brother of fellow Macedonian chieftain, Theodoros Goutas. At an early age, he moved with his family to Tyrnavos as his father decided to move the family there for safety reasons. He initially participated in the armed group of his father, Konstantinos Goutas, and acted in Kastanochoria and Voio since 1904. He then set up his own independent armed group, led by him and his brother, Theodoros. They cooperated with the groups of his father and S. Doukas in the Zagoritsani Operation and in the battle of Ezeretsi (now Petropoulaki) in April 1905 against the Bulgarian komitadjis. Later they fought near Klepisti (now Polykastano), in Gramos against Ottoman military extracts and finally in Osnitsani (now Kastanofyto), against the komitadjis Mitre the Vlach and Konstantinos Kyriazos.

He also participated in the First Balkan War as a volunteer with other Macedonian chieftains. He was distinguished in the Battle of Bizani, where he was killed in action.
