= Sisani =

Sisani Σισάνι
- Community
- Location within Greece
- Coordinates: 40°26.1′N 21°30′E
- Country: Greece
- Administrative region: Western Macedonia
- Regional unit: Kozani
- Municipality: Voio
- Municipal unit: Askio
- Elevation: 850 m (2,790 ft)

Population (2021)
  - Community: 173
- Time zone: UTC+2 (EET)
  - Summer (DST): UTC+3 (EEST)
- Postal code: 500 03
- Area code: +30-2463
- Vehicle registration: ΚΖ

Sisani (Greek: Σισάνι) is a village and a community of the Voio municipality. Before the 2011 local government reform it was part of the municipality of Askio, of which it was a municipal district. The 2021 census recorded 173 inhabitants in the village.
