= Pelekanos, Kozani =

Pelekanos Πελεκάνος
- Community
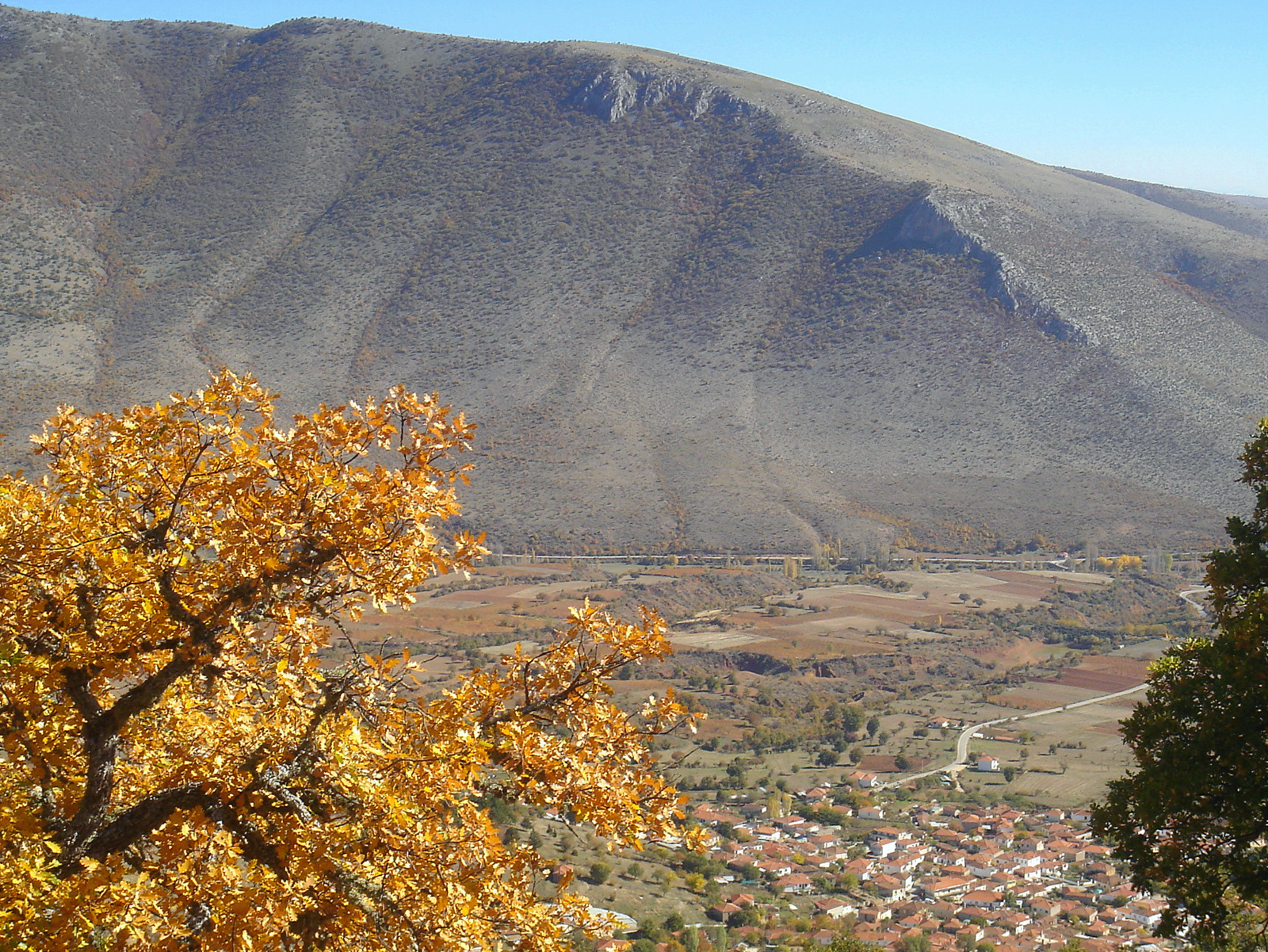
- The village of Pelekanos, Mount Askio on the background

- Location within Greece
- Coordinates: 40°22′04″N 21°27′55″E
- Country: Greece
- Administrative region: Western Macedonia
- Regional unit: Kozani
- Municipality: Voio
- Municipal unit: Askio

Population (2021)
  - Community: 232
- Time zone: UTC+2 (EET)
  - Summer (DST): UTC+3 (EEST)

Pelekanos (Greek: Πελεκάνος, before 1927: Πέλκα – Pelka), is a village in the municipality of Voio, Western Macedonia periphery, Greece. With a population of 232 (2021), mostly elderly, residents it is set at the foothills (760m) of Mount Askio.

The Byzantine historian Procopius mentions the location as Justinian I's fortress of "Pelekon". Ruins of the fortress can be found in the surrounding area to this day. During the early 20th century, the region became relatively poor and economically isolated and consequently a significant part of its population emigrated abroad. Nowadays, the village is well-connected through a modern highway (Via Egnatia) and is known for its red wine production and also as the filming location of Glory Sky (Greek: Ουρανός - Ouranos) which officially represented Greece in the 1963 Cannes Film Festival.
