= Pentavrysos =

Village in Kozani, Greece

Pentavrysos Πεντάβρυσος
- Community
- Location within Greece
- Coordinates: 40°33′20″N 21°43′19″E
- Country: Greece
- Administrative region: Western Macedonia
- Regional unit: Kozani
- Municipality: Eordaia
- Municipal unit: Ptolemaida

Population (2021)
  - Community: 177
- Time zone: UTC+2 (EET)
  - Summer (DST): UTC+3 (EEST)
- Postal code: 50200
- Area code: +30 2463

Pentavrysos (Greek: Πεντάβρυσος), known before 1927 as Koutlar (Greek: Κουτλάρ), is a village located 6 km northeast of Ptolemaida, in northern Kozani regional unit, within the Greek region of Macedonia. It is situated at an altitude of 600 meters. At the 2021 census the population was 177.
