= Ano Komi =

Ano Komi Άνω Κώμη
- Community
- Location within Greece
- Coordinates: 40°13.564′N 21°49.703′E
- Country: Greece
- Administrative region: Western Macedonia
- Regional unit: Kozani
- Municipality: Kozani
- Municipal unit: Elimeia

Area
  - Community: 12.817 km^{2} (4.949 sq mi)
- Elevation: 450 m (1,480 ft)

Population (2021)
  - Community: 1,263
  - Density: 98.54/km^{2} (255.2/sq mi)
- Time zone: UTC+2 (EET)
  - Summer (DST): UTC+3 (EEST)
- Postal code: 500 10
- Area code: +30-2461
- Vehicle registration: ΚΖ

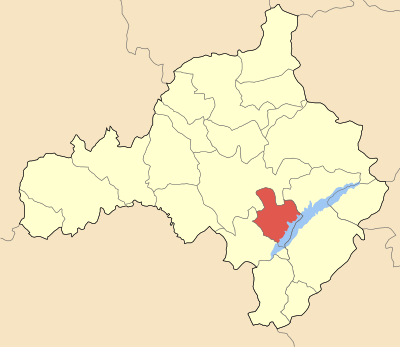

Ano Komi (Greek: Άνω Κώμη) is a village and a community of the Kozani municipality. Before the 2011 local government reform, it was part of the municipality of Elimeia, of which it was a municipal district. The 2021 census recorded 1,263 inhabitants in the community. The community of Ano Komi covers a geographic area of 12.817 km^{2}.
