= Pteleonas =

Pteleonas Πτελεώνας
- Community
- Location within Greece
- Coordinates: 40°28′30″N 21°49′10″E
- Country: Greece
- Administrative region: Western Macedonia
- Regional unit: Kozani
- Municipality: Eordaia
- Municipal unit: Ptolemaida

Population (2021)
  - Community: 17
- Time zone: UTC+2 (EET)
  - Summer (DST): UTC+3 (EEST)
- Postal code: 50200
- Area code: +30 2463

Pteleonas (Greek: Πτελεώνας), known before 1928 as Harbino (Greek: Χαρμπίνα), is a village located 16 km east/southeast of Ptolemaida, in Kozani regional unit, within the Greek region of Macedonia. It is situated at an altitude of 780 meters. At the 2021 census, the population was 17.
