= Milea, Kozani =

Milea Μηλέα
- Community
- Location within Greece
- Coordinates: 40°13.053′N 21°48.611′E
- Country: Greece
- Administrative region: Western Macedonia
- Regional unit: Kozani
- Municipality: Kozani
- Municipal unit: Elimeia

Area
  - Community: 5.388 km^{2} (2.080 sq mi)
- Elevation: 440 m (1,440 ft)

Population (2021)
  - Community: 120
  - Density: 22/km^{2} (58/sq mi)
- Time zone: UTC+2 (EET)
  - Summer (DST): UTC+3 (EEST)
- Postal code: 500 10
- Area code: +30-2461
- Vehicle registration: ΚΖ

Milea (Greek: Μηλέα) is a village and a community of the Kozani municipality. Before the 2011 local government reform it was part of the municipality of Elimeia, of which it was a municipal district. The 2021 census recorded 120 inhabitants in the community. The community of Milea covers an area of 5.388 km^{2}.
