= Akrini =

Akrini Ακρινή
- Community
- Location within Greece
- Coordinates: 40°26′N 21°54.3′E
- Country: Greece
- Administrative region: West Macedonia
- Regional unit: Kozani
- Municipality: Kozani
- Municipal unit: Ellispontos

Area
  - Community: 38.422 km^{2} (14.835 sq mi)
- Elevation: 853 m (2,799 ft)

Population (2021)
  - Community: 758
  - Density: 19.7/km^{2} (51.1/sq mi)
- Time zone: UTC+2 (EET)
  - Summer (DST): UTC+3 (EEST)
- Postal code: 501 50
- Area code: +30-2461
- Vehicle registration: ΚΖ

Akrini (Greek: Ακρινή) is a village and a community of the Kozani municipality. Before the 2011 local government reform it was part of the municipality of Ellispontos, of which it was a municipal district. The 2021 census recorded 758 inhabitants in the community of Akrini. The community of Akrini covers an area of 38.422 km^{2}.

== History ==
Neolithic era tools has been discovered near Akrini. Objects from the 2nd century BC has been found in the area, as well as an Early Christian church of the 4th century AD. The contemporary village of Akrini is inhabited by Greek refugees from Adapazarı.

== Administrative division ==
The community of Akrini consists of two settlements:

- Akrini (population 756 in 2021)
- Profitis Ilias (population 2)

== See also ==
- List of settlements in the Kozani regional unit
