= Polykastano =

Polykastano Πολυκάστανο
- Community
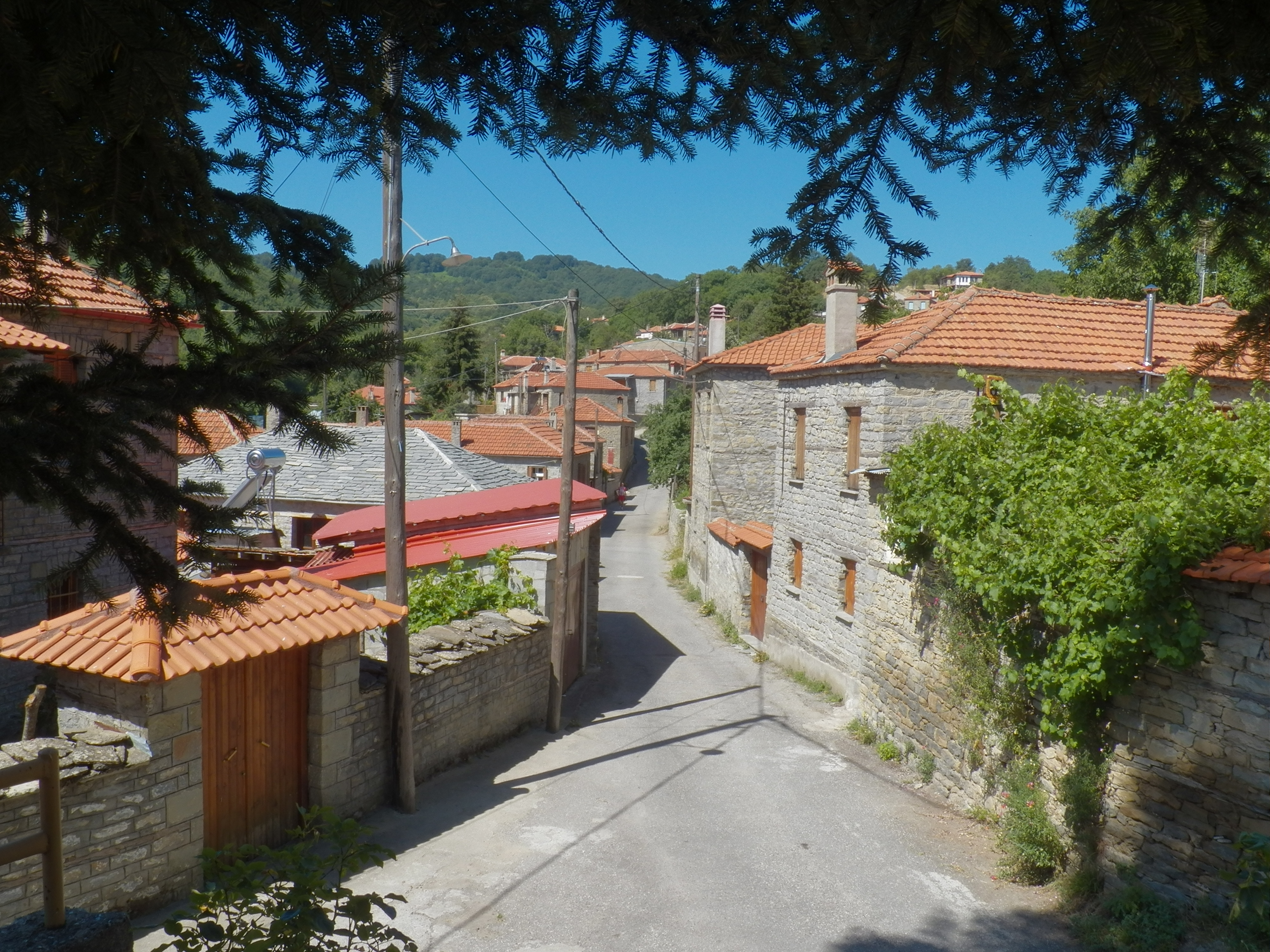

- Location within Greece
- Coordinates: 40°17.6285′N 21°8.269′E
- Country: Greece
- Administrative region: Western Macedonia
- Regional unit: Kozani
- Municipality: Voio
- Municipal unit: Tsotyli
- Elevation: 1,050 m (3,440 ft)

Population (2021)
  - Community: 64
- Time zone: UTC+2 (EET)
  - Summer (DST): UTC+3 (EEST)
- Postal code: 500 02
- Area code: +30-2468
- Vehicle registration: ΚΖ

Polykastano (Greek: Πολυκάστανο, before 1927: Κλεπίστιον – Klepistion), is a village and a community of the Voio municipality. Before the 2011 local government reform it was part of the municipality of Tsotyli, of which it was a municipal district. The 2021 census recorded 64 inhabitants in the village. According to the statistics of Vasil Kanchov ("Macedonia, Ethnography and Statistics"), 250 Greek Christians lived in the village in 1900.
