= Drosero, Kozani =

Drosero Δροσερό
- Community
- Location within Greece
- Coordinates: 40°32′10″N 21°36′15″E
- Country: Greece
- Administrative region: Western Macedonia
- Regional unit: Kozani
- Municipality: Eordaia
- Municipal unit: Ptolemaida

Population (2021)
  - Community: 202
- Time zone: UTC+2 (EET)
  - Summer (DST): UTC+3 (EEST)

Drosero (Greek: Δροσερό, before 1920: Κονούφι - Konoufi, between 1920 and 1957: Έλος - Elos, Bulgarian: Конуй) is a town located in the Ptolemaida colonial unit, western Kozani regional unit, itself in the Greek region of Macedonia.
