= Mavropigi =

Mavropigi Μαυροπηγή
- Community
- Location within Greece
- Coordinates: 40°26′59″N 21°44′03″E
- Country: Greece
- Administrative region: Western Macedonia
- Regional unit: Kozani
- Municipality: Eordaia
- Municipal unit: Ptolemaida

Population (2021)
  - Community: 0
- Time zone: UTC+2 (EET)
  - Summer (DST): UTC+3 (EEST)

Mavropigi (Greek: Μαυροπηγή) is a village located 11 km southeast of Ptolemaida, in Kozani regional unit, within the Greek region of Macedonia. It is located at an altitude of 740 meters above sea level. At the 2021 census, it had no permanent population.

Archaeologists recently discovered an intact tomb dating to the first century BC in the area of Mavropigi, West Macedonia's Kozani region.

The major discovery was announced by a statement from Kozani's Ephorate of Antiquities.

“During the ongoing excavations of the Ephorate of Antiquities of Kozani in the Mavropigi lignite mine, within the partially demolished modern settlement of Mavropigi, and specifically under the foundation of a house, important grave goods were discovered, dating to the end of the 1st century BC,” the statement notes.

The excavation will continue, but the Ephorate noted in its statement that the bronze funeral bier, found under the skeletal remains of the buried person, is unique, at least for Northern Greece. As a completely intact object, it represents a unique discovery for the whole of Greece, according to published archaeological data.

The broader region of Western Macedonia is covered in archaeological sites of great historical interest, and many excavations are currently underway to unearth even more significant discoveries, from many different eras of Greek history.
