= Asvestopetra =

Asvestopetra Ασβεστόπετρα
- Community
- Location within Greece
- Coordinates: 40°27′36″N 21°40′22″E
- Country: Greece
- Administrative region: Western Macedonia
- Regional unit: Kozani
- Municipality: Eordaia
- Municipal unit: Ptolemaida

Population (2021)
  - Community: 705
- Time zone: UTC+2 (EET)
  - Summer (DST): UTC+3 (EEST)
- Postal code: 50200
- Area code: +30 2463

Asvestopetra (Greek: Ασβεστόπετρα) is a small town in the Ptolemaida municipal unit, northern Kozani regional unit, Greece. It is situated at an altitude of 635 meters above sea level. The population was 705 at the 2021 census.
