= Sparto, Kozani =

Sparto Σπάρτο
- Community
- Location within Greece
- Coordinates: 40°12.14′N 21°52.534′E
- Country: Greece
- Administrative region: Western Macedonia
- Regional unit: Kozani
- Municipality: Kozani
- Municipal unit: Elimeia

Area
  - Community: 12.302 km^{2} (4.750 sq mi)
- Elevation: 360 m (1,180 ft)

Population (2021)
  - Community: 99
  - Density: 8.0/km^{2} (21/sq mi)
- Time zone: UTC+2 (EET)
  - Summer (DST): UTC+3 (EEST)
- Postal code: 500 10
- Area code: +30-2461
- Vehicle registration: ΚΖ

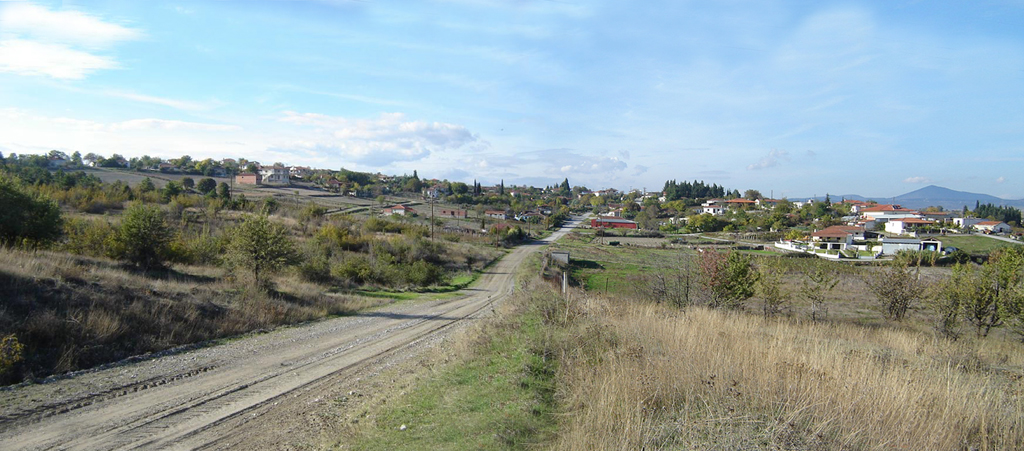
Spartos Kozanis panoramic view

Sparto (Greek: Σπάρτο) is a village and a community of the Kozani municipality. Before the 2011 local government reform it was part of the municipality of Elimeia, of which it was a municipal district. The 2021 census recorded 99 inhabitants in the community. The community of Sparto covers an area of 12.302 km^{2}.
