= Ptelea (disambiguation) =

Ptelea (hoptree) is a genus of shrubs and trees in the family Rutaceae.

Ptelea may also refer to:

- Ptelea (Attica), a deme of ancient Attica, Greece
- Ptelea, Evros, Greece
- Ptelea, Kozani, Greece
