= Sideras =

Sideras Σιδεράς
- Community
- Location within Greece
- Coordinates: 40°23.1′N 21°41.6′E
- Country: Greece
- Administrative region: Western Macedonia
- Regional unit: Kozani
- Municipality: Kozani
- Municipal unit: Dimitrios Ypsilantis

Area
  - Community: 28.554 km^{2} (11.025 sq mi)
- Elevation: 920 m (3,020 ft)

Population (2021)
  - Community: 118
  - Density: 4.13/km^{2} (10.7/sq mi)
- Time zone: UTC+2 (EET)
  - Summer (DST): UTC+3 (EEST)
- Postal code: 501 50
- Area code: +30-2461
- Vehicle registration: ΚΖ

Sideras (Greek: Σιδεράς) is a village and a community of the Kozani municipality. Before the 2011 local government reform it was part of the municipality of Dimitrios Ypsilantis, of which it was a municipal district. The 2021 census recorded 118 inhabitants in the community. The community of Sideras covers an area of 28.554 km^{2}. The small settlement of Ktenas, which was uninhabited between about 1975 and 2005, belongs to the community of Sideras.

The village was named Demirciler (Eng. "smiths") by Turkish inhabitants until the 1924 population exchange between Greece and Turkey.

== See also ==
- List of settlements in the Kozani regional unit
