= Xirolimni =

Xirolimni Ξηρολίμνη
- Community
- Location within Greece
- Coordinates: 40°17′46″N 21°39′29″E
- Country: Greece
- Administrative region: Western Macedonia
- Regional unit: Kozani
- Municipality: Kozani
- Municipal unit: Kozani

Population (2021)
  - Community: 334
- Time zone: UTC+2 (EET)
  - Summer (DST): UTC+3 (EEST)

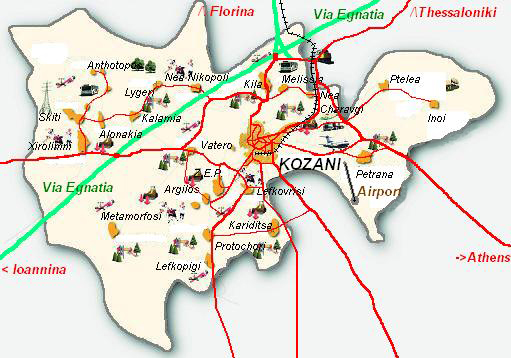
Location in Kozani

Xirolimni (Greek: Ξηρολίμνη) is a community of the city of Kozani in northern Greece. Located west of the city centre, it has a population of 334 (2021).

The village was named Şahinler (Eng. "buzzards") by Ottoman Turk inhabitants until the 1924 population exchange between Greece and Turkey.
