= Karyditsa =

Karyditsa Καρυδίτσα
- Community
- Location within Greece
- Coordinates: 40°15′11″N 21°47′56″E
- Country: Greece
- Administrative region: Western Macedonia
- Regional unit: Kozani
- Municipality: Kozani
- Municipal unit: Kozani

Population (2021)
  - Community: 818
- Time zone: UTC+2 (EET)
  - Summer (DST): UTC+3 (EEST)

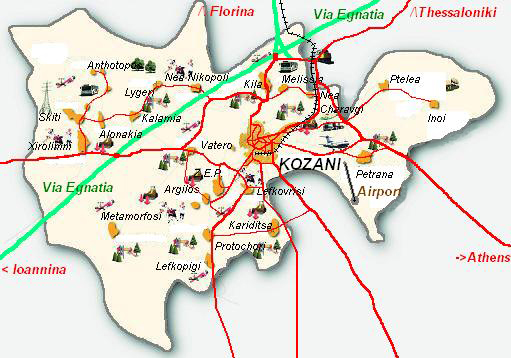
Location in Kozani

Karyditsa (Greek: Καρυδίτσα) is a municipal department of the city of Kozani in northern Greece. Located south of the city centre, it had a population of 818 at the 2021 census.
