= Protochori =

Protochori Πρωτοχώρι
- Community
- Location within Greece
- Coordinates: 40°14′40″N 21°44′56″E
- Country: Greece
- Administrative region: Western Macedonia
- Regional unit: Kozani
- Municipality: Kozani
- Municipal unit: Kozani

Population (2021)
  - Community: 716
- Time zone: UTC+2 (EET)
  - Summer (DST): UTC+3 (EEST)

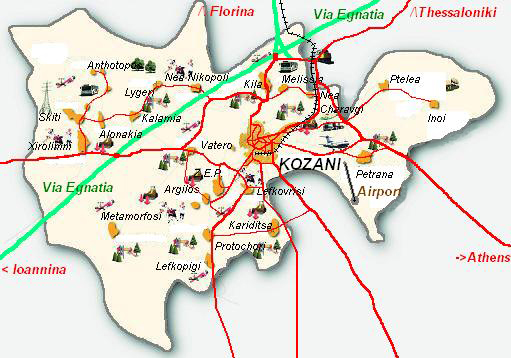
Location in Kozani

Protochori (Greek: Πρωτοχώρι) is a community of the city of Kozani in northern Greece. Located south of the city centre, it has a population of 716 (2021).
