= Livera, Kozani =

Livera Λιβερά
- Community
- Location within Greece
- Coordinates: 40°24.5345′N 21°41.7′E
- Country: Greece
- Administrative region: West Macedonia
- Regional unit: Kozani
- Municipality: Kozani
- Municipal unit: Dimitrios Ypsilantis

Area
  - Community: 21.978 km^{2} (8.486 sq mi)
- Elevation: 960 m (3,150 ft)

Population (2021)
  - Community: 19
  - Density: 0.86/km^{2} (2.2/sq mi)
- Time zone: UTC+2 (EET)
  - Summer (DST): UTC+3 (EEST)
- Postal code: 501 50
- Area code: +30-2461
- Vehicle registration: ΚΖ

Livera (Greek: Λιβερά) is a village and a community of the Kozani municipality. Before the 2011 local government reform it was part of the municipality of Dimitrios Ypsilantis, of which it was a municipal district. The 2021 census recorded 19 inhabitants in the community. The community of Livera covers an area of 21.978 km^{2}.
