= Kalamia =

Village in Western Macedonia, Greece

Kalamia Καλαμιά
- Community
- Location within Greece
- Coordinates: 40°18′43″N 21°41′46″E
- Country: Greece
- Administrative region: Western Macedonia
- Regional unit: Kozani
- Municipality: Kozani
- Municipal unit: Kozani

Population (2021)
  - Community: 137
- Time zone: UTC+2 (EET)
  - Summer (DST): UTC+3 (EEST)

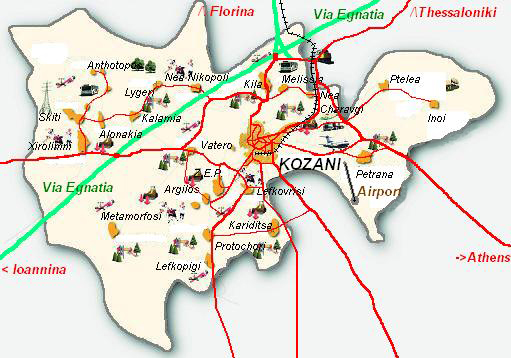
Location in Kozani

Kalamia is a municipal department of the city of Kozani in northern Greece. Located north-west of the city centre, it had a population of 137 at the 2021 census.
