= Metamorfosi, Kozani =

Community in northern Greece

Metamorfosi Μεταμόρφωση
- Community
- Location within Greece
- Coordinates: 40°15′00″N 21°40′41″E
- Country: Greece
- Administrative region: Western Macedonia
- Regional unit: Kozani
- Municipality: Kozani
- Municipal unit: Kozani

Population (2021)
  - Community: 278
- Time zone: UTC+2 (EET)
  - Summer (DST): UTC+3 (EEST)

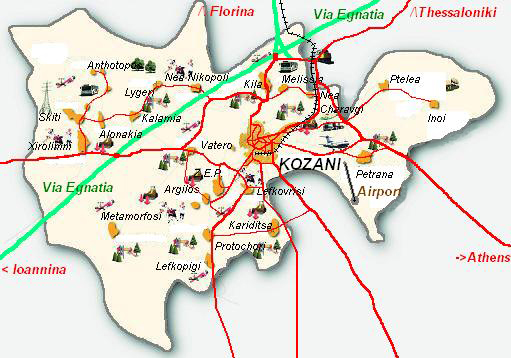
Location in Kozani

Metamorfosi is a community of the city of Kozani in northern Greece. Located southwest of the city centre, it has a population of 278 (2021).
