= Lefkopigi =

Lefkopigi Λευκοπηγή
- Community
- Location within Greece
- Coordinates: 40°13′52″N 21°44′56″E
- Country: Greece
- Administrative region: Western Macedonia
- Regional unit: Kozani
- Municipality: Kozani
- Municipal unit: Kozani

Population (2021)
  - Community: 1,113
- Time zone: UTC+2 (EET)
  - Summer (DST): UTC+3 (EEST)

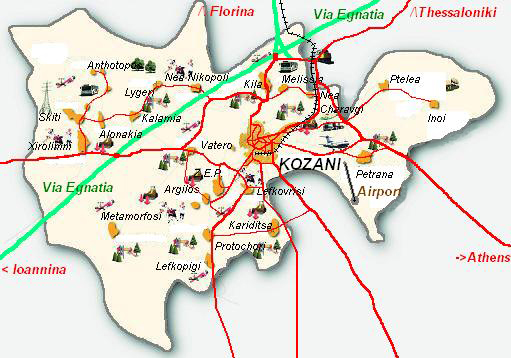
Location in Kozani

Lefkopigi (Greek: Λευκοπηγή) is a community of the city of Kozani in northern Greece. Located south-west of the city centre, it has a population of 1,113 (2021).
