= Voio =

Mountain range in Macedonia, Greece

- Βόιο
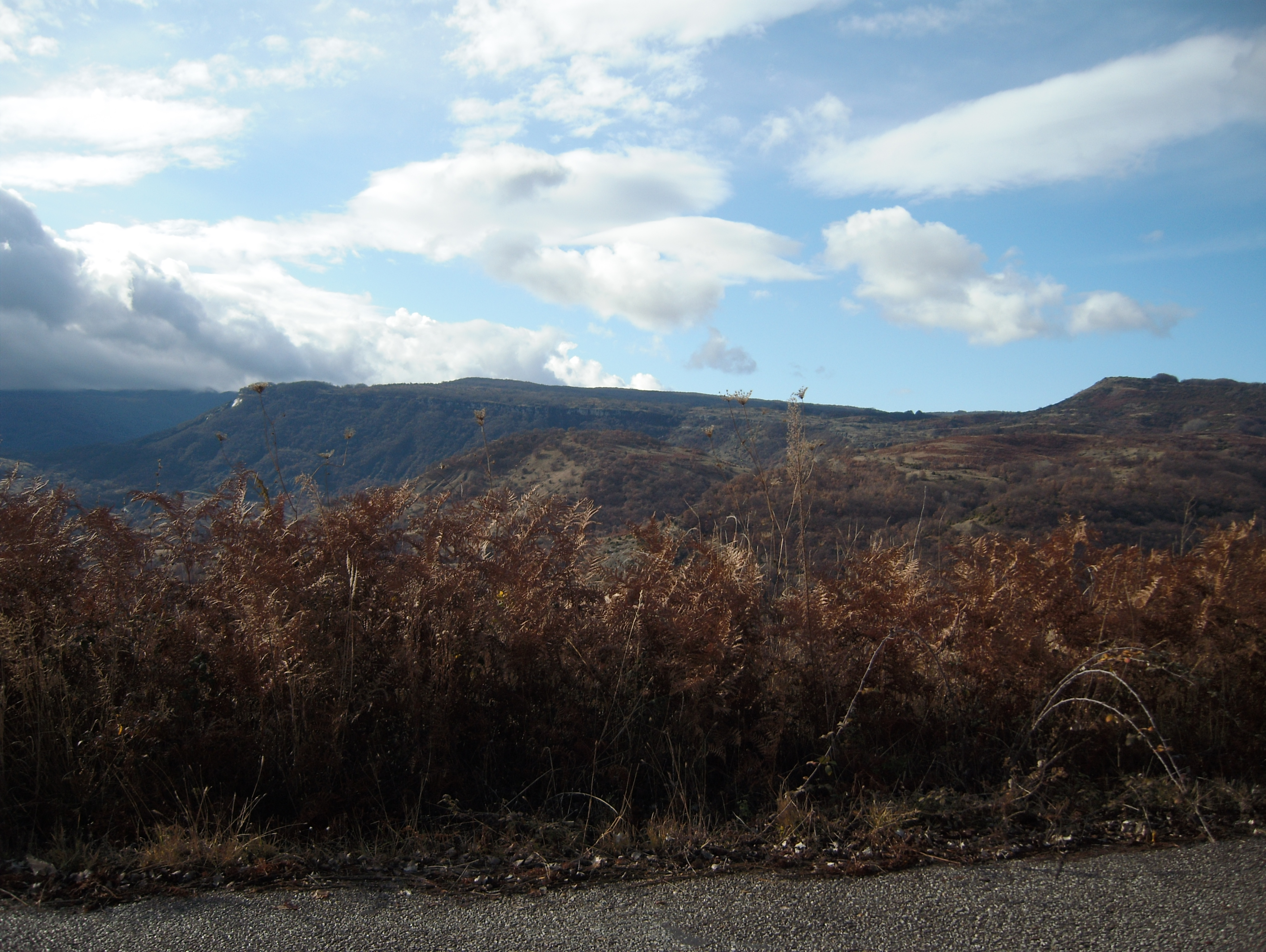
- The mountain ridge Ondria (Όντρια), part of the Voio.

Highest point
- Elevation: 1,805 m (5,922 ft)
- Listing: List of mountains in Greece
- Coordinates: 40°13′30″N 21°05′02″E

Naming
- Pronunciation: Greek: [ˈvoʝo]

Geography
- Location within Greece
- Location: Kastoria and Kozani regional units, Greece

Voio (Greek: Βόιο, Vóio; Ancient Greek: Βόιον - Boeon) is a mountain range in the southwestern Kastoria and western Kozani regional units in Macedonia, Greece. The mountain is part of the Pindus mountains. Its highest elevation is 1,805 m. It is a densely forested and sparsely populated mountain range. It is drained towards the river Sarantaporos in the west and towards the Aliakmonas in the east. The nearest mountain ranges are Gramos to the west and Smolikas to the southwest.

The nearest villages are Pentalofos in the east, Eptachori in the west and Kypseli in the north. The municipality Voio, named after the mountains, is situated in the eastern part. The Greek National Road 20 (Kozani - Konitsa - Ioannina) passes through the mountains, 2 km south of the highest point. The first home of the Boeotians was the mountain Boion; the mountain gave them their name.
