= Koila, Kozani =

Koila Κοίλα
- Community
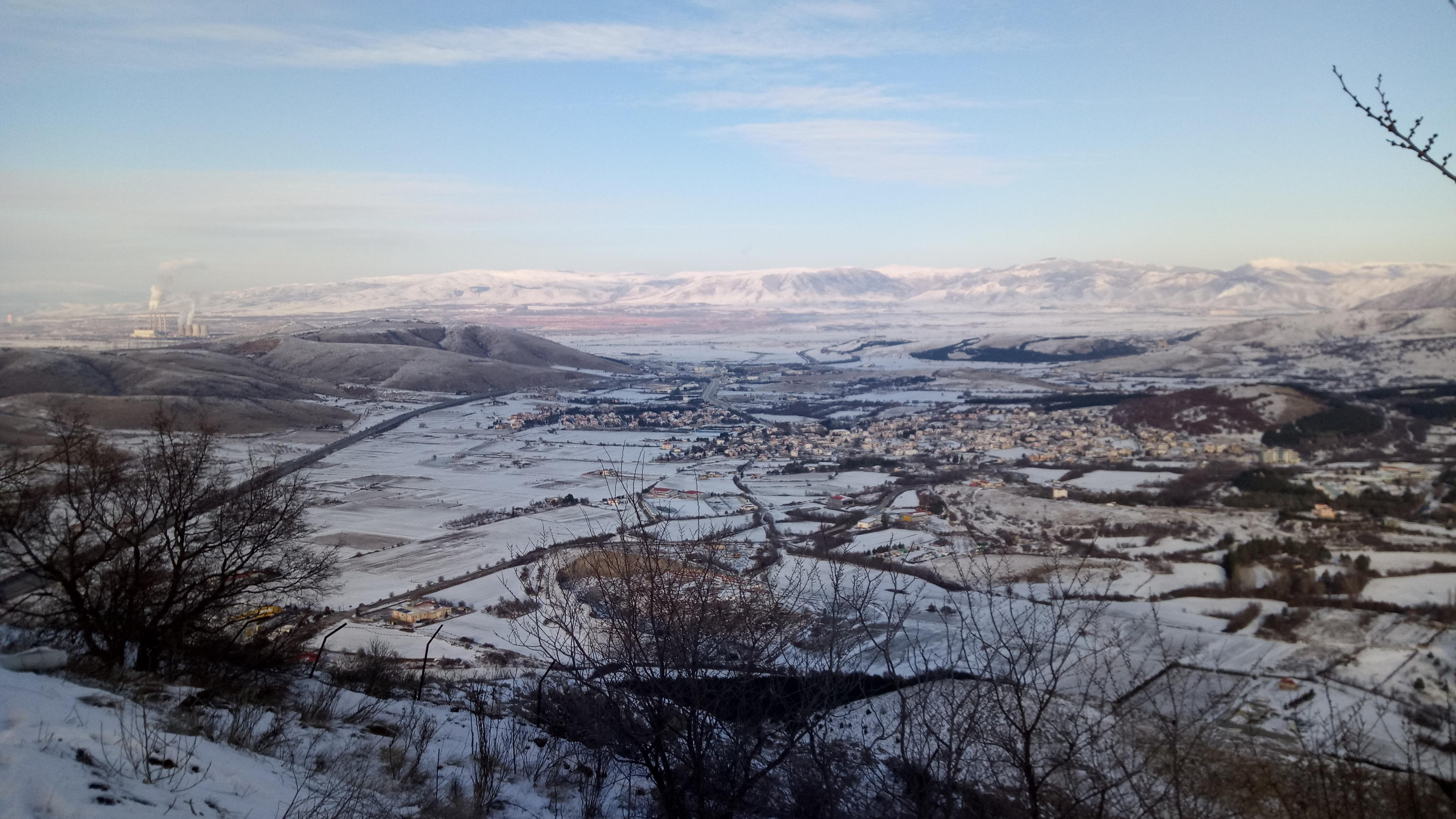
- Kila Kozani

- Location within Greece
- Coordinates: 40°19′50″N 21°47′19″E
- Country: Greece
- Administrative region: Western Macedonia
- Regional unit: Kozani
- Municipality: Kozani
- Municipal unit: Kozani

Population (2021)
  - Community: 1,360
- Time zone: UTC+2 (EET)
  - Summer (DST): UTC+3 (EEST)

Koila (Greek: Κοίλα) is a community of the city of Kozani in northern Greece. It is located 4 km north of the center of the city, between Kozani and the A2 motorway (Egnatia Odos). It consists of Koila and two other settlements: Nea Kardia and Melissia. The population is 1,360 (2021).

The Technological Educational Institut (T.E.I.) and the Exhibition Center of West Macedonia are located in Koila. In September, the Center hosts the annual Commercial Exhibition of Kozani. Many firms from Greece and the other Balkan countries exhibit their products.
