= Pentalofos, Kozani =

Pentalofos Πεντάλοφος
- Municipal unit
- Location within the regional unit

- Location within Greece
- Coordinates: 40°12′N 21°08′E
- Country: Greece
- Administrative region: Western Macedonia
- Regional unit: Kozani
- Municipality: Voio

Area
  - Municipal unit: 83.923 km^{2} (32.403 sq mi)
  - Community: 38.113 km^{2} (14.716 sq mi)

Population (2021)
  - Municipal unit: 367
  - Municipal unit density: 4.37/km^{2} (11.3/sq mi)
  - Community: 272
  - Community density: 7.14/km^{2} (18.5/sq mi)
- Time zone: UTC+2 (EET)
  - Summer (DST): UTC+3 (EEST)
- Postal code: 500 07
- Area code: 24680
- Vehicle registration: KZ

Pentalofos (Greek: Πεντάλοφος, before 1927: Ζουπάνιον – Zoupanion, between 1927 and 1928: Πετρόβουνος – Petrovounos), is a village and a former community in Kozani regional unit, Western Macedonia, Greece. Since the 2011 local government reform it is part of the municipality Voio, of which it is a municipal unit. It is located at 1060 meters elevation to the base of mountain Voio. The municipal unit has an area of 83.923 km^{2}, the community 38.113 km^{2}. The population of the municipal unit was 367 people, while the population of the community itself was 272 people as of 2021.

== Name ==
The village toponym Zoupan is Slavic and referred to particular hierarchies such as the head of a unit. Zoupan is the village name still used by locals. Formed from the toponym Zoupan, due to the local prominence of the village, and the Greek word choria (village), the name Zoupanochoria is used for a group of villages in the wider area.
