= Agia Paraskevi, Kozani =

Agia Paraskevi Αγία Παρασκευή
- Municipal unit
- Location within the regional unit

- Location within Greece
- Coordinates: 40°30′N 21°50′E
- Country: Greece
- Administrative region: West Macedonia
- Regional unit: Kozani
- Municipality: Eordaia

Area
  - Municipal unit: 119.606 km^{2} (46.180 sq mi)
- Elevation: 764 m (2,507 ft)

Population (2021)
  - Municipal unit: 1,111
  - Municipal unit density: 9.289/km^{2} (24.06/sq mi)
- Time zone: UTC+2 (EET)
  - Summer (DST): UTC+3 (EEST)
- Vehicle registration: KZ

Agia Paraskevi (Greek: Αγία Παρασκευή) is a former municipality in Kozani regional unit, West Macedonia, Greece. Since the 2011 local government reform, it is part of the municipality Eordaia, of which it is a municipal unit. The municipal unit has an area of 119.606 km^{2}. The population in 2021 was 1,111. The seat of the municipality was in Agios Christoforos.
