= Ptolemaida-Florina coal mine =

Coal mine in Greece

Coordinates: 40.4255°N 21.8171°E

Ptolemaida-Florina Coal Mine
- Interactive map of Ptolemaida-Florina Coal Mine
- Location: Ptolemaida, Florina, West Macedonia, Greece
- Products: Lignite

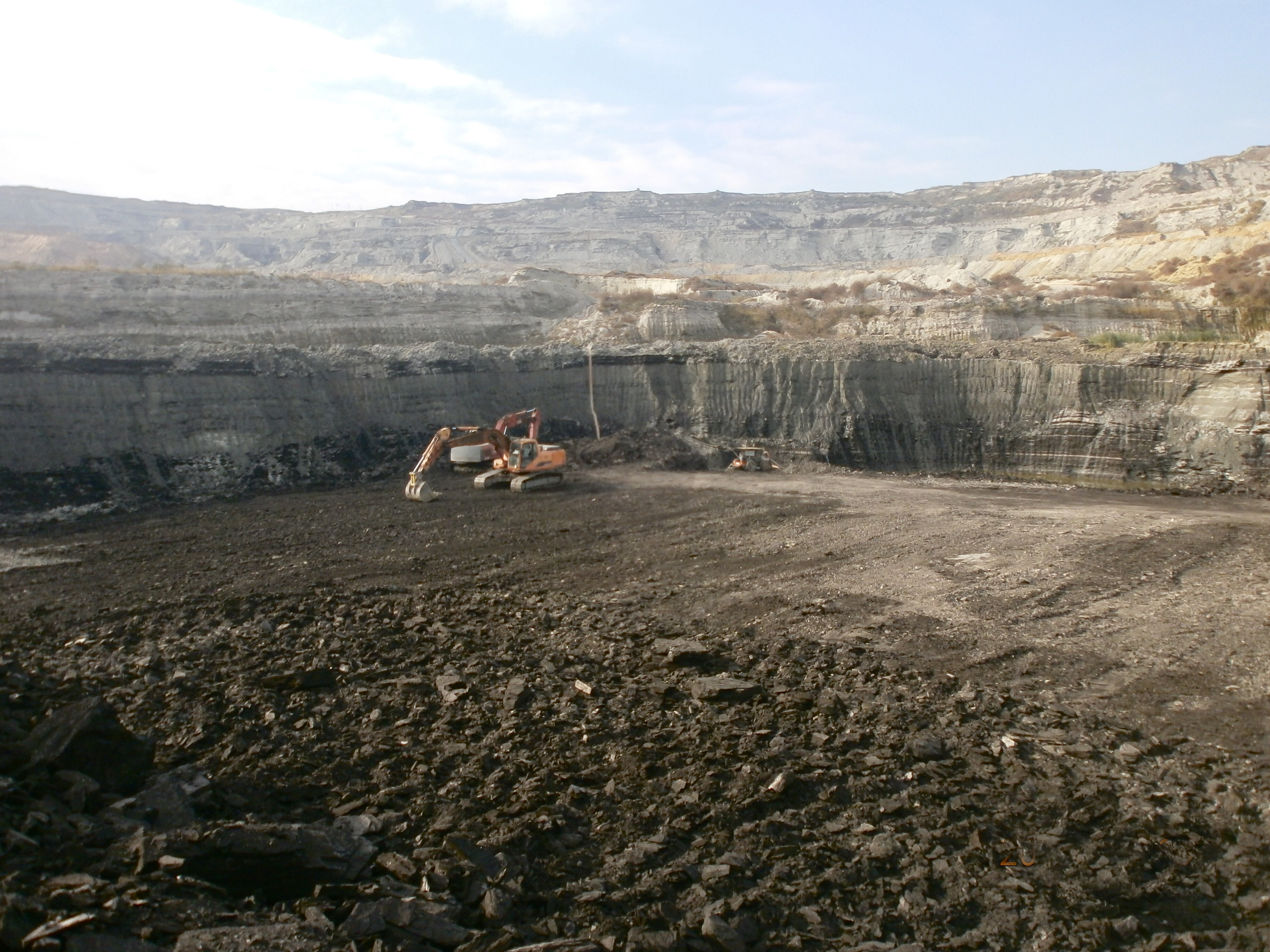
Coal mines in Ptolemaida

The Ptolemaida-Florina Coal Mine is a coal mine in northern Greece. The mine is located in Ptolemaida and Florina in West Macedonia. The mine has coal reserves amounting to 1.82 billion tonnes of lignite, one of the largest lignite reserves in Europe and production is centered on 49 million tonnes per year.

== See also ==
- Energy in Greece
