= Ellispontos =

Ellispontos Ελλήσποντος
- Municipal unit
- Location within the regional unit

- Location within Greece
- Coordinates: 40°22′N 21°57′E
- Country: Greece
- Administrative region: Western Macedonia
- Regional unit: Kozani
- Municipality: Kozani

Area
  - Municipal unit: 337.992 km^{2} (130.499 sq mi)
- Elevation: 749 m (2,457 ft)

Population (2021)
  - Municipal unit: 4,656
  - Municipal unit density: 13.78/km^{2} (35.68/sq mi)
- Time zone: UTC+2 (EET)
  - Summer (DST): UTC+3 (EEST)
- Postal code: 501 50
- Area code: 02461
- Vehicle registration: KZ

Ellispontos (Greek: Ελλήσποντος) is a former municipality in Kozani regional unit, Western Macedonia, Greece. Since the 2011 local government reform it is part of the municipality Kozani, of which it is a municipal unit. The 2021 census recorded 4,656 residents in the municipal unit. The seat of the municipality was in Koilada. The municipal unit of Ellispontos covers an area of 337.992 km^{2}.
