= Elimeia =

Elimeia Ελιμεία
- Municipal unit
- Location within the regional unit

- Location within Greece
- Coordinates: 40°14′N 21°50′E
- Country: Greece
- Administrative region: West Macedonia
- Regional unit: Kozani
- Municipality: Kozani

Area
  - Municipal unit: 99.166 km^{2} (38.288 sq mi)
- Elevation: 496 m (1,627 ft)

Population (2021)
  - Municipal unit: 5,176
  - Municipal unit density: 52.20/km^{2} (135.2/sq mi)
- Time zone: UTC+2 (EET)
  - Summer (DST): UTC+3 (EEST)
- Vehicle registration: KZ

Elimeia (Greek: Ελιμεία) is a former municipality in Kozani regional unit, West Macedonia, Greece. Since the 2011 local government reform it is part of the municipality Kozani, of which it is a municipal unit. The municipal unit has an area of 99.166 km^{2}. The population is 5,176 (2021). The seat of the municipality was in Krokos. In the referendum that took place in the spring of 2006, 55% of the inhabitants voted for the union of their municipality with Kozani.
