= Eordaia =

Municipality in Western Macedonia, Greece

Eordaia Εορδαία
- Municipality
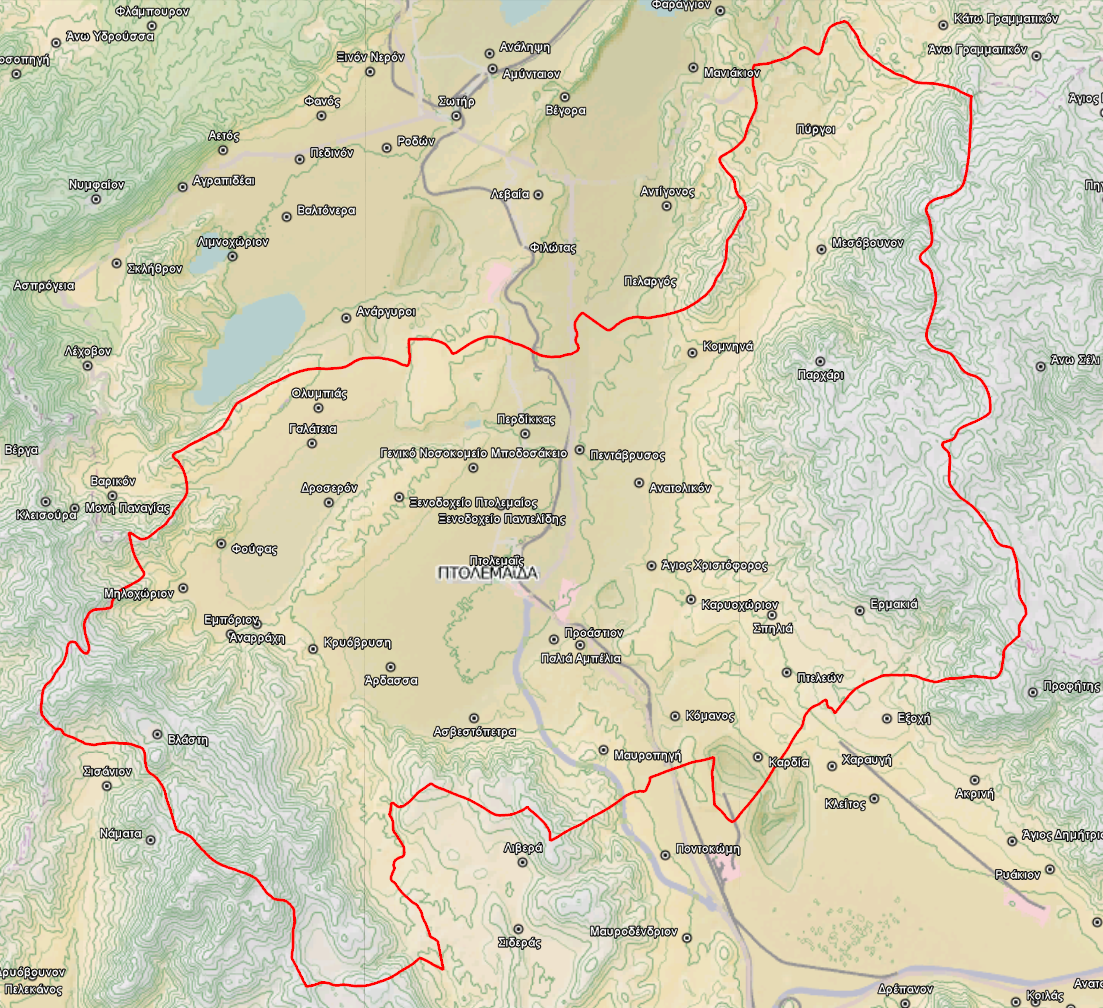

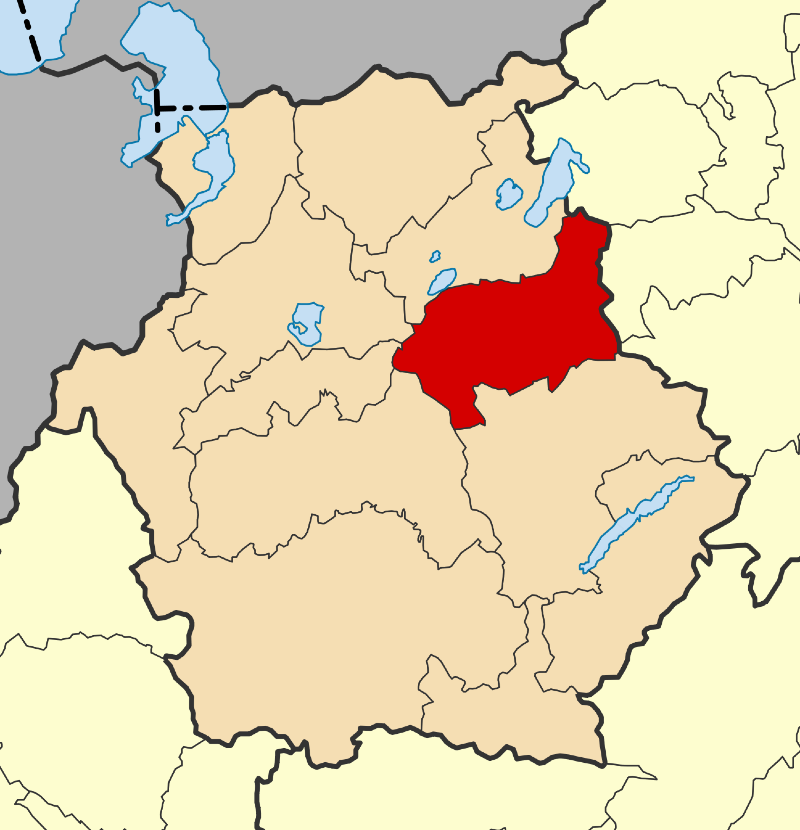

- Location within Greece
- Coordinates: 40°31′N 21°41′E
- Country: Greece
- Administrative region: Western Macedonia
- Regional unit: Kozani
- Seat: Ptolemaida

Area
  - Municipality: 708.8 km^{2} (273.7 sq mi)

Population (2021)
  - Municipality: 42,515
  - Density: 59.98/km^{2} (155.4/sq mi)
- Time zone: UTC+2 (EET)
  - Summer (DST): UTC+3 (EEST)

Eordaia (Greek: Εορδαία) is a municipality in the Kozani regional unit of Western Macedonia, Greece, located in substantially the same geographical area as the ancient region of the same name. It covers an area of 708.807 km^{2} and has a population of 42,515 according to the 2021 census. The seat of the municipality is the town of Ptolemaida.

== Municipality ==
The municipality Eordaia was formed at the 2011 local government reform by the merger of the following 5 former municipalities, that became municipal units:

- Agia Paraskevi
- Mouriki
- Ptolemaida
- Vermio
- Vlasti

== Province ==
The province of Eordaia (Greek: Επαρχία Εορδαίας) was one of the provinces of the Kozani Prefecture. Its territory corresponded with that of the current municipality Eordaia, and a few villages of the municipality Kozani. It was abolished in 2006.

== History ==
The history of Eordaia can be found stretching long before 2000 BCE when the first Greeks known as the Mycenean Greeks began to inhabit this area. Remnants of copper mines exploited from 2700 up until 1200 BCE indicate strongly that the Greeks inhabited Eordaia for many years. Iron mines have also been exploited in the region.

== Recent discoveries ==
Within a 50-year period, paleontologists and archaeologists have made many discoveries due to the industrial development of the Eordaian countryside. In particular, the skeletal fossils of a prehistoric mammoth, a prehistoric elephant, and Stone Age tools have all been found within the province of Eordaia. These finds add to knowledge on the variety of animal species and human artifacts in this particular region of western Macedonia. In addition, two ancient Macedonian tombs have been excavated within Eordaia. The first was located in a rural area of the village of Spilia, while the second was located in the village of Pyrgoi.
