= Tsotyli =

Tsotyli Τσοτύλι
- Municipal unit
- Location within the regional unit

- Location within Greece
- Coordinates: 40°15.745′N 21°19.5′E
- Country: Greece
- Administrative region: Western Macedonia
- Regional unit: Kozani
- Municipality: Voio

Area
  - Municipal unit: 325.19 km^{2} (125.56 sq mi)
  - Community: 25.658 km^{2} (9.907 sq mi)
- Elevation: 840 m (2,760 ft)

Population (2021)
  - Municipal unit: 2,619
  - Municipal unit density: 8.054/km^{2} (20.86/sq mi)
  - Community: 1,453
  - Community density: 56.63/km^{2} (146.7/sq mi)
- Time zone: UTC+2 (EET)
  - Summer (DST): UTC+3 (EEST)
- Postal code: 500 02
- Area code: +30-2468
- Vehicle registration: KZ

Tsotyli (Greek: Τσοτύλι, also Τσοτίλι - Tsotili) is a village and former municipality currently part of the Voio municipality. Prior to 2011 local government reforms, it was the seat of the municipality of Tsotyli. The municipal unit has an area of 330.269 km^{2}, the community 25.658 km^{2}. The 2021 census recorded 1,453 residents in the village, and 2,619 residents in the municipal unit of Tsotyli. It is a notable western Greek area, in part for its ancient housing estate (oikotrofeio). The community consists of the villages Tsotyli, Rokastro and the former village Nea Sparti.

== Name ==
The linguist Kostas Oikonomou stated the toponym is likely derived from the Albanian word çotill/ë -a, meaning 'stamp, wooden tool used to churn butter'. It stems from the Albanian toçill/ë, -a, 'potter's wheel', which evolved through metathesis from Slavic words for whetstone, rendered as točilo in Bulgarian and točilj in Serbian.

== Demographics ==
Tsotyli was a mixed village and a part of its population were Greek speaking Muslim Vallahades. The 1920 Greek census recorded 959 people in the village, and 400 inhabitants (100 families) were Muslim in 1923. Historian Apostolos Vakalopoulos wrote Tsotyli had 40 Christian families and 150 Vallahades families. Following the Greek–Turkish population exchange, Greek refugee families in Tsotyli were from East Thrace (5), Asia Minor (17) and Pontus (64) in 1926. The 1928 Greek census recorded 852 village inhabitants. In 1928, the refugee families numbered 86 (339 people).

== See also ==
- List of settlements in the Kozani regional unit
