= Neapoli, Kozani =

Neapoli Νεάπολη
- Municipal unit
- Location within the regional unit

- Location within Greece
- Coordinates: 40°18′N 21°24′E
- Country: Greece
- Administrative region: Western Macedonia
- Regional unit: Kozani
- Municipality: Voio

Area
  - Municipal unit: 238.227 km^{2} (91.980 sq mi)
  - Community: 22.001 km^{2} (8.495 sq mi)
- Elevation: 669 m (2,195 ft)

Population (2021)
  - Municipal unit: 3,246
  - Municipal unit density: 13.63/km^{2} (35.29/sq mi)
  - Community: 2,063
  - Community density: 93.77/km^{2} (242.9/sq mi)
- Time zone: UTC+2 (EET)
  - Summer (DST): UTC+3 (EEST)
- Postal code: 500 01
- Area code: 24680
- Vehicle registration: KZ

Neapoli (Greek: Νεάπολη, before 1928: Λειψίστα – Leipsista), is a town in the Kozani regional unit of West Macedonia in northern Greece. A former municipality, it has been a municipal unit of Voio since the 2011 local government reform. The municipal unit has an area of 238.277 km^{2}, the community 22.001 km^{2}. The municipal unit has a population of 3,246 while the community has 2,063 inhabitants (2021). The community consists of the town Neapoli and village Melidoni.

== Name ==
An original name of modern Neapoli was Lapsista (Λαψίστα). Linguist Max Vasmer states the toponym was Lěvšišče and cognate with the Serbo–Croatian Lepšić, a personal name derived from the Slavic word lěp meaning "nice". Linguist Yordan Zaimov associated the toponym Lapsista with the Bulgarian toponym Lapšišta, deriving both from Lubčište in reference to a personal name formed from Lubko, with bč in Slavic rendered as ps (ψ) in Greek.

Linguist Konstantinos Oikonomou derives the toponym from the Albanian word lafsh/ë referring to the plumage or plume of a rooster. The term when applied in a geographical context could refer to small mountainous heights. The word lafsh/ë along with either the Slavic ending or Albanian suffix ishta resulted in the phonetic form l'afšišta/liafšišta through the Albanian l (l'i) and Leafšišta or Leausista (Λεαυσίστα) where i became e near the l. In the last form of the toponym, the sound ea turned into a and fš became ps (ψ) resulting in Lapsista (Λαψίστα). Other villages with the name are Ano (Upper) and Lower (Kato) Lapsista in Greek Epirus.

Under Ottoman rule, the town was known as Nasliç (ناسليچ) in Turkish. In Greek, the form Anaselitsa (Ανασελίτσα), derived from a nearby village Seltsa (modern Eratyra) was also used for the town and the wider area until the late 1920s.

== History ==
Michael Kalinderis lists Leipista as populated by Greek speaking Muslim Vallahades. The 1920 Greek census recorded 1401 people in the town, and 250 inhabitants (130 families) were Muslim in 1923. Following the Greek–Turkish population exchange, Greek refugee families in Leipsista were from East Thrace (3), Asia Minor (142), Pontus (85) and the Caucasus (8) in 1926. The 1928 Greek census recorded 1592 town inhabitants. In 1928, the refugee families numbered 239 (978 people). The town mosque was destroyed and some remnants of its masonry were incorporated in the foundations of the Financial Tax Office building.
