= Voio (municipality) =

Voio Βόιο
- Municipality
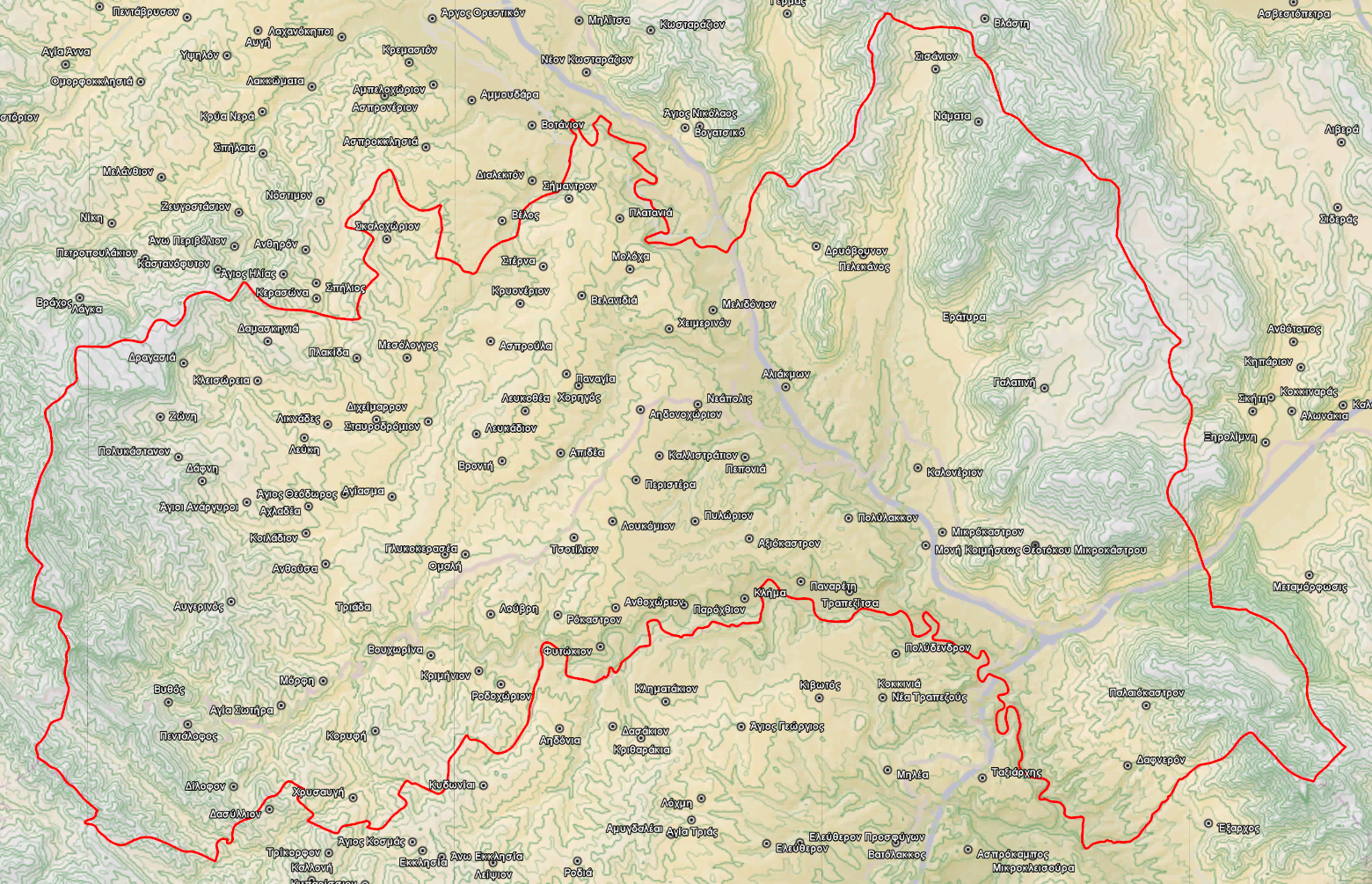

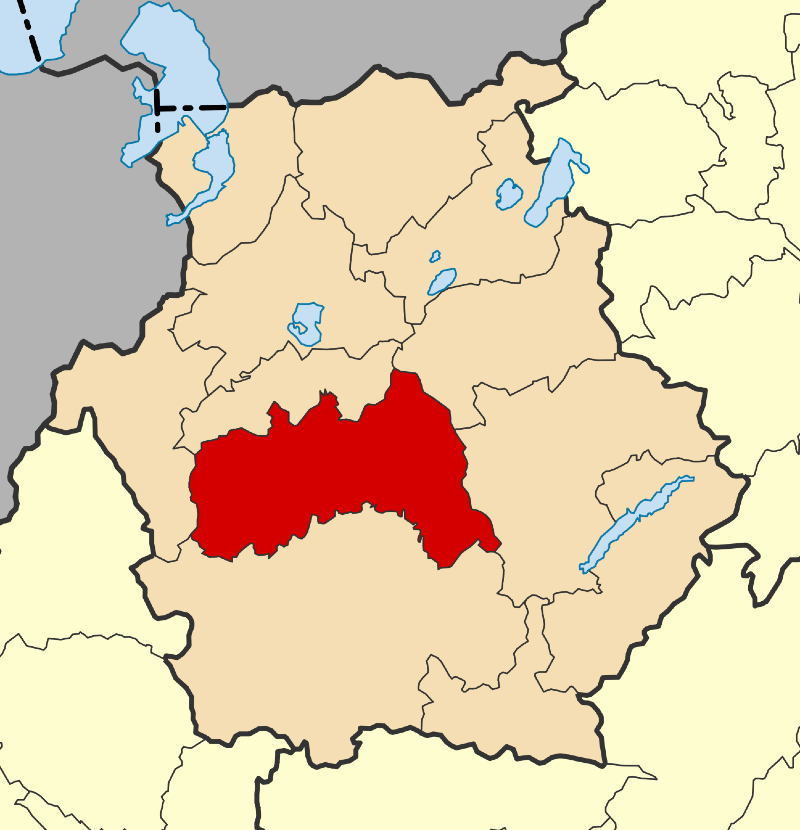

- Location within Greece
- Coordinates: 40°16′N 21°33′E
- Country: Greece
- Administrative region: Western Macedonia
- Regional unit: Kozani
- Seat: Siatista

Area
  - Municipality: 1,007.6 km^{2} (389.0 sq mi)

Population (2021)
  - Municipality: 14,947
  - Density: 14.834/km^{2} (38.421/sq mi)
- Time zone: UTC+2 (EET)
  - Summer (DST): UTC+3 (EEST)

Voio (Greek: Βόιο) is a municipality in the Kozani regional unit, Greece. The seat of the municipality is the town Siatista. It was named after the Voio mountains. The municipality has an area of 1007.629 km^{2}. Its population at the 2021 census was 14,947.

== Name ==
In the mid 1990s, Upper (Ano) and Lower (Kato) Voio, derived from Mount Voios were geographic terms spread by the Research Association of Ano Voios for use to describe the wider region. Another name Kastanochoria, referring to an abundance of local chestnut trees, also signified villages which received no Greek refugee populations following the Greek–Turkish population exchange. The Ottoman era name Anaselitsa, derived from a local village Seltsa (modern Eratyra) was used until the late 1920s for the wider area when official geographic name changes made it obsolete.

== Municipality ==
The municipality Voio was formed at the 2011 local government reform by the merger of the following 5 former municipalities, that became municipal units:

- Askio
- Neapoli
- Pentalofos
- Siatista
- Tsotyli

== Province ==
The province of Voio (Greek: Επαρχία Βοΐου) was one of the provinces of the Kozani Prefecture. Its territory corresponded with that of the current municipality Voio. It was abolished in 2006.
