= Kozani (regional unit) =

Kozani Περιφερειακή ενότητα Κοζάνης
- Regional unit
- Municipalities of West Macedonia. 1-5: Kozani regional unit

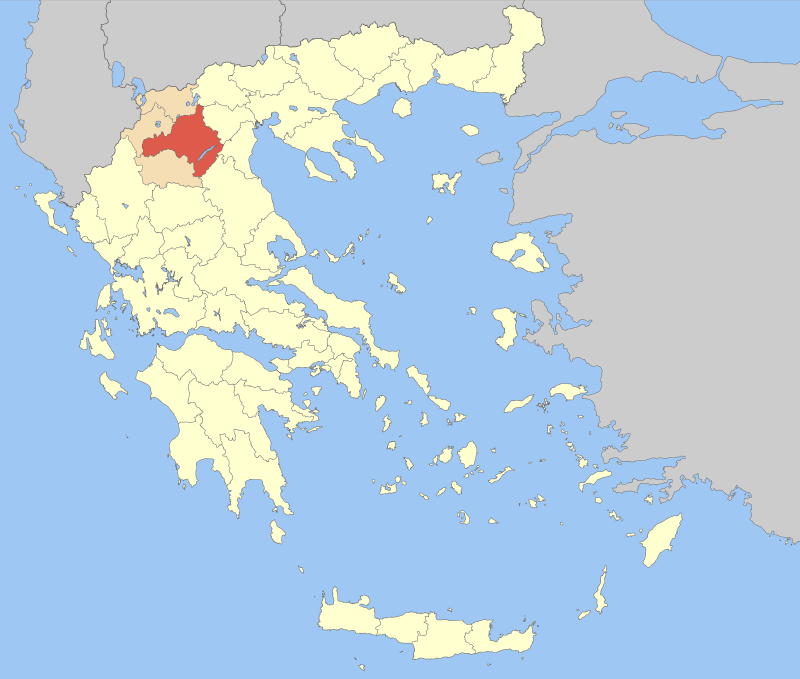
- Kozani within Greece

- Location within Greece
- Coordinates: 40°20′N 21°40′E
- Country: Greece
- Geographic region: Macedonia
- Administrative region: Western Macedonia
- Seat: Kozani

Area
  - Total: 3,516 km^{2} (1,358 sq mi)

Population (2021)
  - Total: 137,210
  - Density: 39.02/km^{2} (101.1/sq mi)
- Time zone: UTC+2 (EET)
  - Summer (DST): UTC+3 (EEST)
- Postal code: 50x xx
- Area code: 246x0
- Vehicle registration: KZ
- Website: www.kozani.gr

Kozani (Greek: Περιφερειακή Ενότητα Κοζάνης, romanized: Perifereiakí Enótita Kozánis) is one of the regional units of Greece. It is part of the region of Western Macedonia, in the geographic region of Macedonia. Its capital is the city of Kozani.

== Geography ==
Kozani borders the regional units of Kastoria to the west and northwest, Florina to the north, Pella to the northeast, Imathia and Pieria to the east, Larissa (part of Thessaly) to the southeast, and Grevena to the south.

The main mountain ranges are Askio in the northwest, Voio in the west, Vermio in the northeast and the Pierian Mountains in the southeast. The river Aliakmon flows through the southern part, and through the large reservoir Lake Polyfytos. Lignite is mined in the north, around Ptolemaida.

=== Climate ===
Its climate ranges from continental to mountainous. Kozani has warm to hot summers and cool winters, cooler than Thessaloniki, the mountainous, the western and the eastern portions receive cold winters and features snow. Its sunshine days are days shorter than the south and by the coastline, it is rainier than the south. Temperatures range from 25 to 30 °C (77 to 86 °F) during the summer months.

== Administration ==
The regional unit Kozani is subdivided into 5 municipalities. These are (number as in the map in the infobox):

- Eordaia (2)
- Kozani (1)
- Servia (4)
- Velventos (5)
- Voio (3)

=== Prefecture ===
Kozani was created as a prefecture (Greek: Νομός Κοζάνης) in 1915. As a part of the 2011 Kallikratis government reform, the regional unit Kozani was created out of the former prefecture Kozani. The prefecture had the same territory as the present regional unit. At the same time, the municipalities were reorganised. The municipality Servia-Velventos was split into the municipalities Servia and Velventos in 2019.

New municipality	Old municipalities	Seat
Eordaia	Ptolemaida	Ptolemaida
Eordaia	Agia Paraskevi	Ptolemaida
Eordaia	Vermio	Ptolemaida
Eordaia	Vlasti	Ptolemaida
Eordaia	Mouriki	Ptolemaida
Kozani	Kozani	Kozani
Kozani	Aiani	Kozani
Kozani	Dimitrios Ypsilantis	Kozani
Kozani	Elimeia	Kozani
Kozani	Ellispontos	Kozani
Servia	Servia	Servia
Servia	Kamvounia	Servia
Servia	Livadero	Servia
Velventos	Velventos	Velventos
Voio	Siatista	Siatista
Voio	Askio	Siatista
Voio	Neapoli	Siatista
Voio	Pentalofos	Siatista
Voio	Tsotyli	Siatista

=== Provinces ===
Kozani had three provinces:

- Kozani Province - Kozani
- Eordea Province - Ptolemaida
- Voio Province - Siatista

== History ==
=== Early years ===
The area was part of several kingdoms of Upper Macedonia, including the ancient Eordaia and Elimiotis, and it was later part of the kingdom of Macedonia. After the Third Macedonian War it was ruled by the Roman Empire. It later became a part of the Byzantine Empire after the breakup into the West and the East. In the early 14th to the 15th century, it was ruled by the Ottoman Empire and lasted until the Balkan Wars of 1913. The Kozani Prefecture was created in 1915 and also included the present Florina, Grevena and the Kastoria regional units.

=== Modern times ===
Refugees from Asia Minor and Pontus during the Greco-Turkish War of 1919 to 1922 brought refugees to the area including Kozani and villages and towns that removed the Turkish population to the country which later became only known as Turkey. The economy boomed and was disrupted later on. After World War II and the Greek Civil War, most of the buildings were repaired. Kozani opened its airport and later its hospital.

== Economy ==
Kozani has been a prosperous area in the course of its history. Its merchants are known to have dominated the commerce of the Balkan peninsula, expanding their trade activities to the north and along the Danube. Nowadays, Kozani is still among the most prosperous areas of the Greek province, but for a different reason, its rich mining industry. Kozani produces lignite, which is the main source of the electric power produced in Greece, nitrous salts which are processed into fertilizers, and chromium. There was also an asbestos mine that remained operational until the mid-1990s, which has now ceased its operation. In the regional unit of Kozani there is also the artificial lake and hydroelectric dam of Polyfytos, which further contributes to the electricity production of Greece. The region's vast industrial advancement in a short period of time has raised environmentalist concerns.

== Media ==
=== Newspapers ===
The main newspapers of the region are Chronos, Proinos Logos, Tharros, and Grammi.

=== Television ===
Prominent television news channels in the region are West Channel, Flash TV, and TOP Channel.

=== Radio ===
Notable broadcast radio are ERT Kozani FM 100.2 and 100.6, Siera FM 105.3, Erotiko 99.5 FM, Fresh Radio 92.9 FM, Diva FM 91.6, and NRG FM 89.5.

== Transport ==
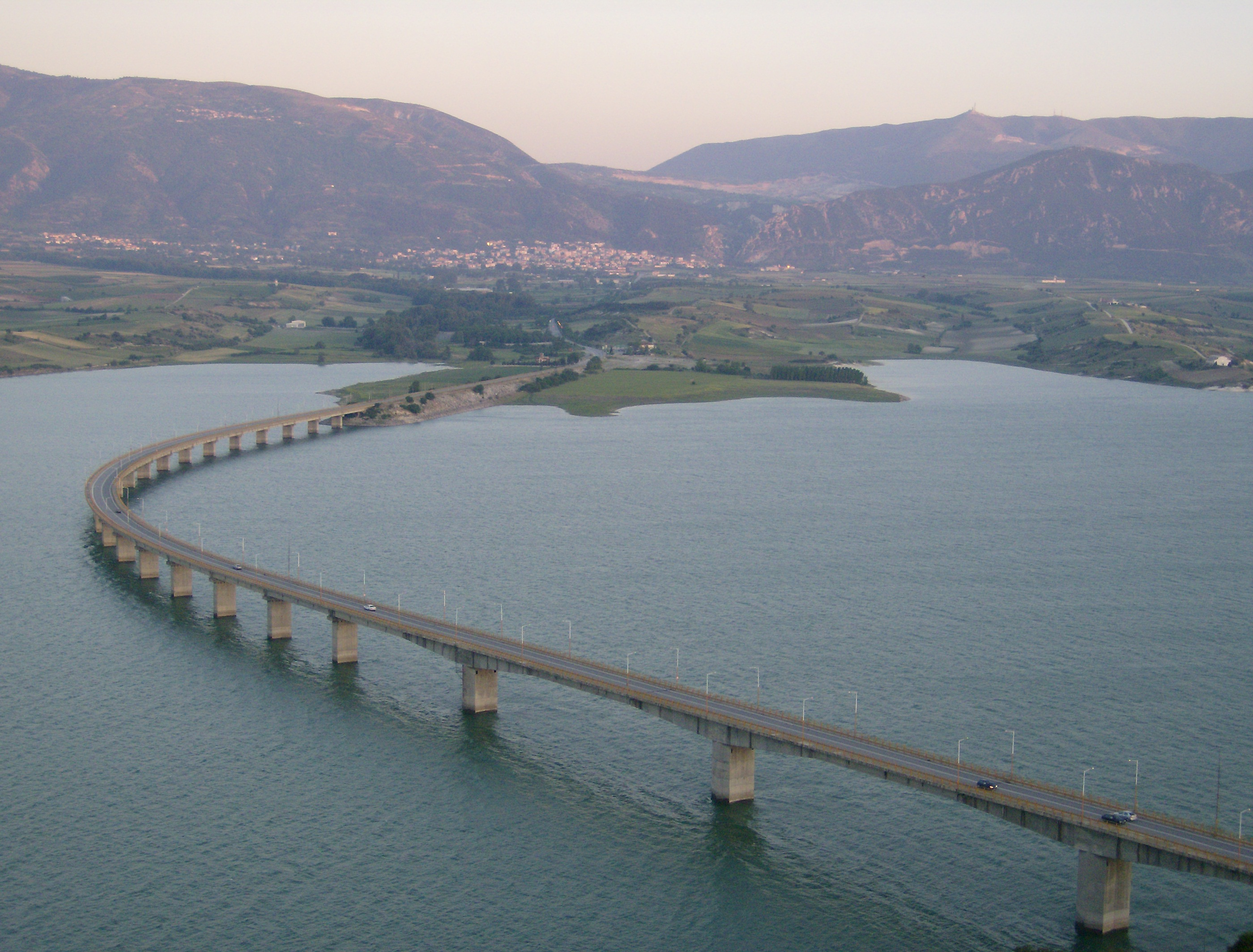
The Neraida bridge (1352 m.) over the artificial lake of the river Aliakmonas

The Kozani regional unit used to be connected to the Greek railway network through the Kozani–Amyntaio railway: however, the railway is currently disused, severed by the Ptolemaida-Florina coal mine.

The main roads in the regional unit are the A2, A27 and A29 motorways, along with the EO3, EO4, EO15, EO20 and Ptolemaida–Florina national roads: the Drepano–Petrana, Koila–Drepano and Vatero–Koila national roads make up the northern bypass of the regional unit's capital.

== See also ==
- List of settlements in the Kozani regional unit
