= Greeks in Serbia =

Грци у Србији Έλληνες στη Σερβία

Total population
- 690 (2022) 4,500 of Greek ancestry (est.)

Regions with significant populations
- Belgrade, Smederevo, Novi Sad, Niš

Languages
- Serbian and Greek

Religion
- Eastern Orthodoxy

Greeks are recognized ethnic minority in Serbia. According to data from the 2022 census, there were 690 ethnic Greeks living in Serbia although the estimation by the Association of Greeks in Serbia puts the number of Serbs of Greek descent at 4,500 people.

== History ==
=== Middle Ages ===
During the Early Middle Ages, Serbia was a subject of the Byzantine Empire. The ethnogenesis of Serbs began in the Byzantine-Slavic environment, part of the wider Byzantine commonwealth. In the 11th and 12th centuries, the Serbs began fighting for independence, revolting against the Byzantines. In the following centuries, Serbia was independent and was mostly in friendly relations with Byzantium. Most of the queen consorts were Byzantine women (such as Eudokia Angelina, Simonida, Maria Palaiologina, Irene Kantakouzene, Helena Palaiologina). Some Byzantine families found refuge in Serbia at the end of the 14th and early 15th century, following Ottoman conquests, such as the Angeloi and Kantakouzenos; notable statesmen in the Serbian Despotate of Greek origin include Janja Kantakouzenos, Dimitrije Kantakuzin and Mihailo Anđelović.

=== Modern period ===
The first mention of a Greek school in Serbia was in 1718, with Stephanos Daskalos as a teacher at Belgrade. The Greek schools were much respected and were attended by children of famous Serbs. The Greek schools invited language teachers from Greece to teach at primary and secondary schools wherever there was a Greek community such as Karlovac, Smederevo, Zemun, Belgrade, Požarevac, Kragujevac, Novi Sad, Šabac and others. Serbian Patriarch Kalinik II (1765-1766) was an ethnic Greek, and played a crucial role in the Ottoman abolition of the Serbian Patriarchate of Peć in 1766.

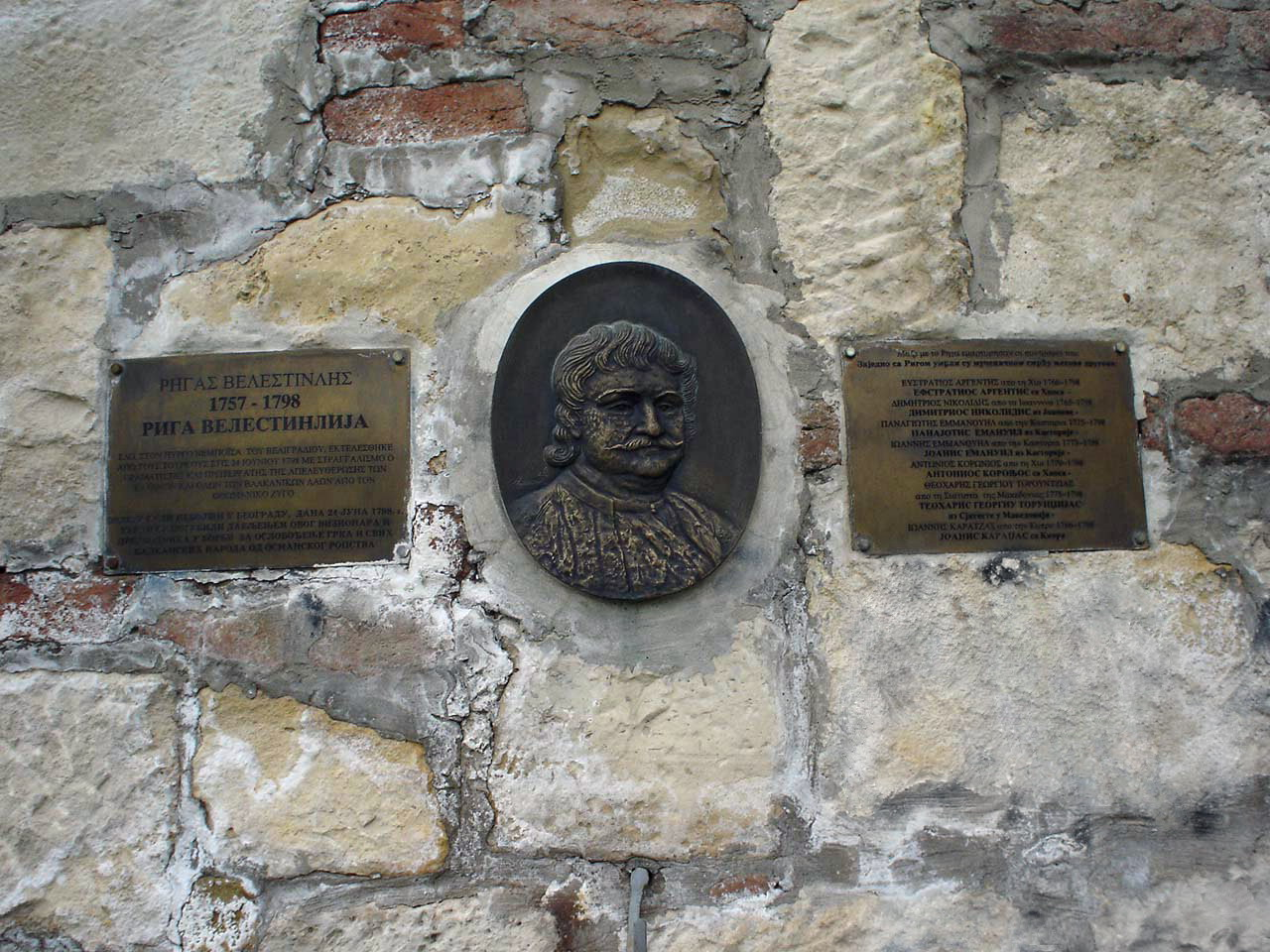
Rigas Feraios memorial plaque in front of Nebojša Tower

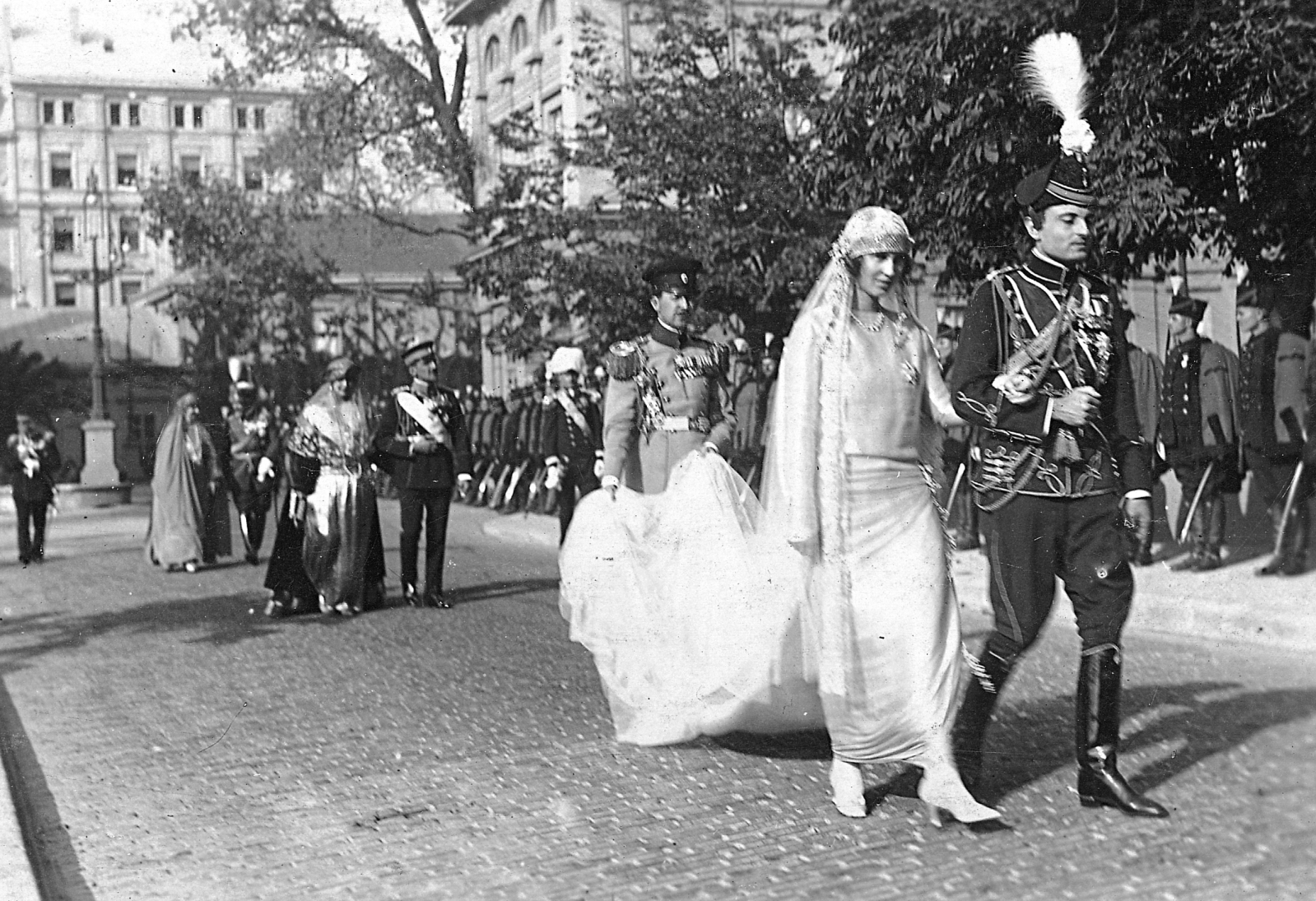
The wedding of Princess Olga of Greece and Denmark and Prince Paul of Yugoslavia, 1923

Several Aromanian families (from Macedonia) were held captives by the Bulgarians in 1916 in Bulgarian-occupied Požarevac (In Serbia) and stayed until 1918 when the Bulgarian front was breached and they returned to Greece. They worked at the Serbs' vineyards and in the homes of the Jewish merchant-families. However, a number of Greeks remained in Požarevac, who were involved chiefly in commerce and in hotel enterprises, and with great success at that. Some of them became renowned, rich and eminent citizens of the city. Especially as owners of kafeneia (coffee shops), hotels. They gave Greek names to their kafeneia, such as "Itia" (willow tree) or "Kleousa" (weeping willow), "Ta Dyo Lefka Peristeria" (The Two White Doves), or "Kasine". The Greeks and Serbs were Orthodox Christians, and consequently their co-habitation was very good. Very frequently, and early on, weddings between Serbs and Greeks. With the passage of time, the second and third generations of the Greek settlers lost the Greek language, mainly because the Greeks were not living isolated or in groups, but very quickly assimilated into the wider Serbian society.

In May 1945, 4,650 Greek refugees, mostly male members of ELAS, settled in the Maglić village with the help of Yugoslav government. From 1945 to 1948, it was a sui generis case of Greek extraterritorial jurisdiction. The Yugoslav conflict with informbiro saw the Greek community divided between loyalty to Yugoslavia and the Comintern, and those who supported the latter left the country. The remaining 800 also emigrated to Greek Macedonia eventually, with only a few remaining.

Many Greeks added the Slavic ending "ić", "ski", or "ev" to their surnames as an assimilation process in Yugoslavia.

=== Contemporary period ===
Greek politicians and organizations backed Serbia during the Yugoslav Wars. Greek volunteers fought alongside the Serbs in the Greek Volunteer Guard, a company of the Army of the Republika Srpska.

The Greek minority living in Serbia have turned to Greece to not recognize the unilateral secession in Kosovo by the Kosovo Albanians. They stated that the independence of Kosovo would endanger the stability in the Balkans and weaken the traditional Serbian-Greek relations.

...We, Greeks in Serbia, feel concern over the fact that the Greek government has remained silent regarding the self-proclamation of the fake state of Kosovo... We appeal to Greece to not destroy everything honorable and good - which it has done until now by supporting a devoted friend and ally in this region.

The appeal adds that a wrong decision in the matter by the Greek government would "ruin what has taken a long time to build between the two countries".

== Culture ==
The Greek-Serbian families has their own name day. Mixed Serb-Greeks celebrate the Slava (Serbian patron saint veneration) and they all celebrate Annunciation.

The Greek Foreign Ministry asserts that marriages between Serbs and Greeks living in Serbia are quite common, and that this is both a cause and result of the close bonds shared by many Greeks and Serbs.

== Notable people ==
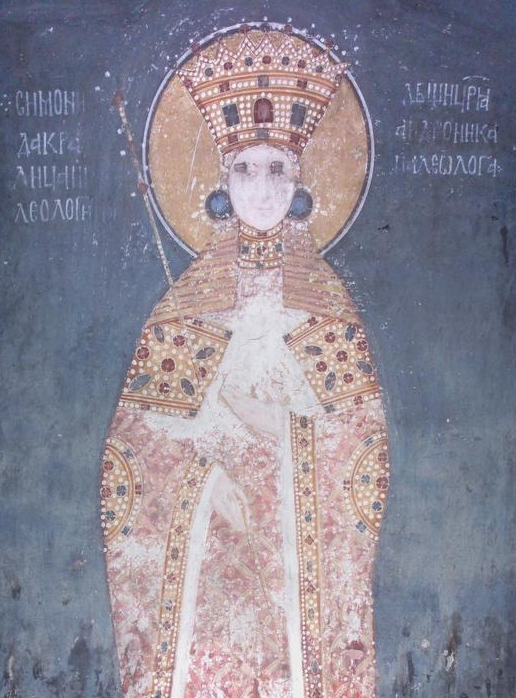
Simonida – Queen consort of Serbia (1299–1321)

- Bata Paskaljević – actor, Greek paternal descent
- Radomir Šaper – Serbian professor, Greek paternal descent
- Kosta Abrašević – poet, born in Ohrid, Greek maternal descent
- Kosta Kumanudi – politician and professor, Greek paternal descent
- Vladan Đorđević – politician, Greek paternal descent from Northern Macedonia
- Fanula Papazoglu – historian, Greek descent from North Macedonia
- Jovan Sterija Popović – playwright and poet, Greek paternal descent
- Konstantin Hadija – secretary of Miloš Obrenović, Greek paternal descent
- Antim Zepos – archbishop
- Naum Krnar – secretary of Karađorđe, Greek descent
- Jovan Grčić Milenko – poet
- Vera Jeftimijades-Jobst – fencer, Greek paternal descent
- Dragutin Inkiostri Medenjak – decorative painter, Greek paternal descent
- Srđan Šaper – musician and businessman, Greek paternal descent
- Panajot Papakostopulos, doctor
- Nenad Pagonis – cruiserweight kickboxer, Greek paternal descent

== See also ==
- Greek diaspora
- Greece–Serbia relations
