= Kantakuzin =

Kantakuzin or Kantakuzinović is the Serbian variant of the Byzantine surname Kantakouzenos; in the 15th century several descendants of the Kantakouzenoi lived in the Serbian Despotate. It may refer to:

- Janja Kantakuzin
- Dimitrije Kantakuzin
