= Zisis =

Zisis (Greek: Ζήσης) is both a Greek masculine given name and a surname. Notable people with the name include:

== Given name ==
- Zisis Babanasis (born 1964), Greek fencer
- Zisis Chatzistravos (born 1999), Greek footballer
- Zisis Karachalios (born 1996), Greek footballer
- Zisis Karademos (died 1705), Greek armatole
- Zisis Oikonomou (1911–2005), Greek poet and prose writer
- Zisis Sarikopoulos (born 1990), Greek basketball player
- Zisis Sotiriou (born early 1800s), Greek revolutionary of the Greek War of Independence
- Zisis Tsekos (born 1964), Greek footballer
- Zisis Verros (1880–1985), Greek chieftain of the Macedonian Struggle
- Zisis Vrakas (born 1857), Greek chieftain of the Macedonian Struggle
- Zisis Vryzas (born 1973), Greek footballer and technical director
- Zisis Ziagas (born 1972), Greek footballer

== Surname ==
- Georgios Zisis (born 1999), Greek footballer
- Ioannis Zisis (1881–1941), Hellenic Army General during World War II
- Nikos Zisis (born 1983), Greek basketball executive and former basketball player
