= 2026 Serbian national minorities councils elections =

2026 Serbian national minorities' councils elections
- 8 November 2026; 22 November 2026 (repeated in some polling stations)

The 2026 Serbian national minorities councils elections were held on 8 November 2026.

== Electoral system ==
The Albanians, Ashkali, Bosniaks, Bulgarians, Bunjevci, Croats, Czechs, (Balkan) Egyptians, Germans, Greeks, Hungarians, Macedonians, Montenegrins, Poles, Roma, Romanians, Rusyns, Slovaks, Slovenians, Ukrainians and Vlachs elect their council through a direct election. The Gorani and Russian council elections are held indirectly through an electoral assembly.

== Electoral lists ==
#	Ballot name	Ballot carrier	Ethnic group	Political position	Signatures
1	Movement for Democratic Progress – Shqiprim Musliu; LPD	Shqiprim Musliu	Albanians		
2	Democratic Party – Sali Salihi; PD	Sali Salihi	Albanians		
3	Party for Democratic Action; PVD/PDD	none	Albanians		486
4	Alternative for Changes – Levent Ćazimi; APN/AZP	Levent Ćazimi	Albanians		377
1	United Ashkali for Serbia – Emini Azis	Emini Azis	Ashkali		103
2	Ajnur Toplica – Our Voice – Our Future	Ajnur Toplica	Ashkali		62
3	Muhamet Behrami – For the Progress of Ashkali	Muhamet Behrami	Ashkali		66
3	For the Victory of Ashkali – Erdelj Herinc; ZPA	Erdelj Herinc	Ashkali		
4	Ashkali but Together – Iljaz Ramadanović	Iljaz Ramadanović	Ashkali		60
1	Egyptians of Serbia – Bajram Kruezi	Bajram Kruezi	Balkan Egyptians		71
1	Sandžak Democratic Party – Elmir Habibovic; SDP	Elmir Habibovic	Bosniaks	Centre-left	1,506
2	Guardians of Sandžak; SDAS	none	Bosniaks	Centre-right	1,687
3	Usame Zukorlić – Movement for the Unification of Bosniaks; SPP	Usame Zukorlić	Bosniaks	Centre-right	2,098
4	United Bosniaks – Samir Tandir; BOSS	Samir Tandir	Bosniaks		
1	That's Us – Natural Movement – Vladimir Zaharijev; TSM–PP	Vladimir Zaharijev	Bulgarians		262
2	Our People – Our Voice – Our Future – Party of Bulgarians of Serbia; PBS	none	Bulgarians		
2	Democratic Party of Bulgarians – Nebojša Ivanov; DPB	Nebojša Ivanov	Bulgarians		
1	Bunjevci – United for Serbia; BM	none	Bunjevci	Big Tent	73
2	Dr. Suzana Kujundžić Ostojic – Let it be known that Bunjevac lives!	Suzana Kujundžić Ostojic	Bunjevci		106
3	Bunjevci for their Identiy – Alliance of Bačka Bunjevci; SBB	none	Bunjevci		72
1	HNV - Croatian National Vision - Jasna Vojnic; HDZ, DSHV faction	Jasna Vojnic	Croats	Centre-right	
2	United for the HNV; DSHV faction	none	Croats	Centre-right	
3	Alliance of Croats of Vojvodina – Everything According to Plan 2026; DSHV faction	none	Croats	Centre-right	
1	Czechs Win!	none	Czechs		
2	Czech List	none	Czechs		
3	Czechs Together	none	Czechs		61
1	Joint List of Danube Swabians	none	Germans		112
1	Greeks Together – Petros Rodiftsis-Nagy; Kantakuzina	Petros Rodiftsis-Nagy	Greeks		53
2	Greeks Together – Heart for Serbia!	none	Greeks		
3	United Greeks for United Serbia	none	Greeks		
1	Hungarian Unity; VMSZ, VMDP, MEP	none	Hungarians	Centre-right	7,166
2	Vojvodina Hungarian Restart; MM, VMDK, TISZA	none	Hungarians	Centre-left	1,319
1	For Macedonians above all; GD	none	Macedonians		94
2	Democratic Party of Macedonians – Zoran Peševski; DPM	Zoran Peševski	Macedonians		112
3	Macedonians in Serbia	none	Macedonians		
4	Macedonians Together	none	Macedonians		
1	Montenegrin Electors of Serbia – Professor Dr. Čedomir Čupić; Elemont	Čedomir Čupić	Montenegrins		153
2	Dragoljub Malović – Unique	Dragoljub Malović	Montenegrins		
1	Polish Unity	none	Poles		62
1	United Roma for United Serbia – Dejan Vlajković; SNS	Dejan Vlajković	Roma	Big tent	1,331
1	Romanians Together – Moving Forward!	none	Romanians		227
2	Romanian Party – Romanians Win – Dr. Jon Sfera	Jon Sfera	Romanians		
1	Ruthenians Together	none	Rusyns		136
2	Honest for Ruthenians – Prof. Dr. Michael Faysa	Michael Faysa	Rusyns		111
3	On the Wave of Change; NV–NLje	none	Rusyns		141
4	Music of Ruthenians – Slavko Roman Rondo; MR	Slavko Roman Rondo	Rusyns		
1	Slovaks Together	none	Slovaks		
2	We Serve Only the Slovak Nation – Matica Slovenská in Serbia – Juraj Červenák; MSS	Juraj Červenák	Slovaks		
1	Slovenes Together; Sava	none	Slovenians		178
1	Senjuk – Filip Pronek	Filip Pronek	Ukrainians		88
2	United Sremska Mitrovica – Novi Sad – Inđija – Vrbas – Kula; Kolomejka	none	Ukrainians		62
1	United Vlachs for United Serbia	none	Vlachs	Big tent	359

== Results ==
Party	Votes	%	Seats
Ashkali
United Ashkali for Serbia	187	35.62	6
For the Progress of Ashkali	119	22.67	3
Ashkali but Together	102	19.43	3
Our Voice – Our Future	96	18.29	3
For the Progress of Ashkali	21	4.00	–
Total	525	100.00	15
Valid votes	525	98.87	
Invalid/blank votes	6	1.13	
Total votes	531	100.00	
Registered voters/turnout	2,906	18.27	
Source: RIK
Balkan Egyptians
Egyptians of Serbia	287	100.00	15
Total	287	100.00	15
Total votes	287	–	
Registered voters/turnout	3,554	8.08	
Source: RIK
Bosniaks
Guardians of Sandžak	15,100	42.00	15
Sandžak Democratic Party	12,655	35.20	13
Movement for the Unification of Bosniaks	7,295	20.29	7
United Bosniaks (BOSS)	902	2.51	–
Total	35,952	100.00	35
Valid votes	35,952	99.00	
Invalid/blank votes	362	1.00	
Total votes	36,314	100.00	
Registered voters/turnout	114,777	31.64	
Source: RIK
Bulgarians
That's Us – Natural Movement	3,043	47.33	9
Party of Bulgarians of Serbia	1,977	30.75	6
Democratic Party of Bulgarians	1,409	21.92	4
Total	6,429	100.00	19
Valid votes	6,429	97.48	
Invalid/blank votes	166	2.52	
Total votes	6,595	100.00	
Registered voters/turnout	15,743	41.89	
Source: RIK
Croats
Croatian National Vision	5,294	67.18	16
United for the HNV	1,511	19.18	4
Alliance of Croats of Vojvodina	1,075	13.64	3
Total	7,880	100.00	23
Valid votes	7,880	98.33	
Invalid/blank votes	134	1.67	
Total votes	8,014	100.00	
Registered voters/turnout	22,863	35.05	
Source: RIK
Czechs
Czech List	363	53.86	8
Czechs Win!	164	24.33	4
Czechs Together	147	21.81	3
Total	674	100.00	15
Valid votes	674	98.54	
Invalid/blank votes	10	1.46	
Total votes	684	100.00	
Registered voters/turnout	1,498	45.66	
Source: RIK
Germans
Joint List of Danube Swabians	560	100.00	15
Total	560	100.00	15
Valid votes	560	98.59	
Invalid/blank votes	8	1.41	
Total votes	568	100.00	
Registered voters/turnout	2,026	28.04	
Source: RIK
Greeks
Greeks Together	299	41.99	7
Greeks Together – Heart for Serbia!	209	29.35	4
United Greeks for United Serbia	204	28.65	4
Total	712	100.00	15
Valid votes	712	98.48	
Invalid/blank votes	11	1.52	
Total votes	723	100.00	
Registered voters/turnout	3,752	19.27	
Source: RIK
Macedonians
Macedonians Together	1,312	46.74	9
For Macedonians above all	696	24.80	5
Democratic Party of Macedonians	601	21.41	4
Macedonians in Serbia	198	7.05	1
Total	2,807	100.00	19
Valid votes	2,807	98.87	
Invalid/blank votes	32	1.13	
Total votes	2,839	100.00	
Registered voters/turnout	9,368	30.31	
Source: RIK
Montenegrins
Montenegrin Electors of Serbia	1,334	66.37	15
Unique	676	33.63	8
Total	2,010	100.00	23
Valid votes	2,010	97.34	
Invalid/blank votes	55	2.66	
Total votes	2,065	100.00	
Registered voters/turnout	11,231	18.39	
Source: RIK
Poles
Polish Unity	114	100.00	15
Total	114	100.00	15
Valid votes	114	99.13	
Invalid/blank votes	1	0.87	
Total votes	115	100.00	
Registered voters/turnout	298	38.59	
Source: RIK
Roma
United Roma for United Serbia	6,284	100.00	35
Total	6,284	100.00	35
Valid votes	6,284	98.42	
Invalid/blank votes	101	1.58	
Total votes	6,385	100.00	
Registered voters/turnout	60,980	10.47	
Source: RIK
Romanians
Romanians Together – Moving Forward!	3,075	56.73	13
Romanian Party – Romanians Win	2,345	43.27	10
Total	5,420	100.00	23
Valid votes	5,420	96.61	
Invalid/blank votes	190	3.39	
Total votes	5,610	100.00	
Registered voters/turnout	20,347	27.57	
Source: RIK
Rusyns
On the Wave of Change	2,208	66.69	14
Ruthenians Together	546	16.49	3
Honest for Ruthenians	453	13.68	2
Music of Ruthenians	104	3.14	–
Total	3,311	100.00	19
Valid votes	3,311	99.52	
Invalid/blank votes	16	0.48	
Total votes	3,327	100.00	
Registered voters/turnout	6,933	47.99	
Source: RIK
Slovaks
Matica Slovenská in Serbia	8,665	79.09	18
Slovaks Together	2,291	20.91	5
Total	10,956	100.00	23
Valid votes	10,956	98.93	
Invalid/blank votes	119	1.07	
Total votes	11,075	100.00	
Registered voters/turnout	26,047	42.52	
Source: RIK
Slovenes
Slovenes Together	688	100.00	15
Total	688	100.00	15
Valid votes	688	98.57	
Invalid/blank votes	10	1.43	
Total votes	698	100.00	
Registered voters/turnout	2,856	24.44	
Source: RIK
Ukrainians
Senjuk	373	55.34	8
United	301	44.66	7
Total	674	100.00	15
Valid votes	674	99.26	
Invalid/blank votes	5	0.74	
Total votes	679	100.00	
Registered voters/turnout	2,236	30.37	
Source: RIK
Vlachs
United Vlachs for United Serbia	3,527	100.00	23
Total	3,527	100.00	23
Valid votes	3,527	98.22	
Invalid/blank votes	64	1.78	
Total votes	3,591	100.00	
Registered voters/turnout	21,046	17.06	
Source: RIK
