= Tranovalto =

Tranovalto Τρανόβαλτο
- Community
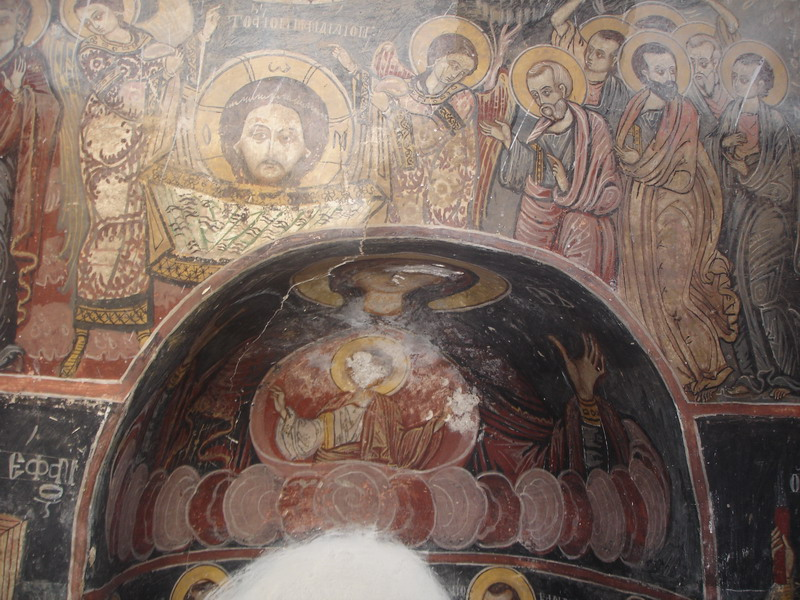
- Fresco in St Paraskeva Church of Tranovalto

- Location within Greece
- Coordinates: 40°03′32″N 21°52′02″E
- Country: Greece
- Administrative region: Western Macedonia
- Regional unit: Kozani
- Municipality: Servia
- Municipal unit: Kamvounia

Population (2021)
  - Community: 614
- Time zone: UTC+2 (EET)
  - Summer (DST): UTC+3 (EEST)
- Postal code: 50500

Tranovalto is a village and a community in the municipality of Servia, Kozani regional unit, Greece. It was the seat of the Kamvounia municipality. It is situated 659 m (2,162 ft) above sea level, and is located 42 km (26 mi) from the regional capital of Kozani. The population was 614 in 2021.

The monastery Moni Stanou is nearby.
