= Georgios Papastamkos =

Greek politician

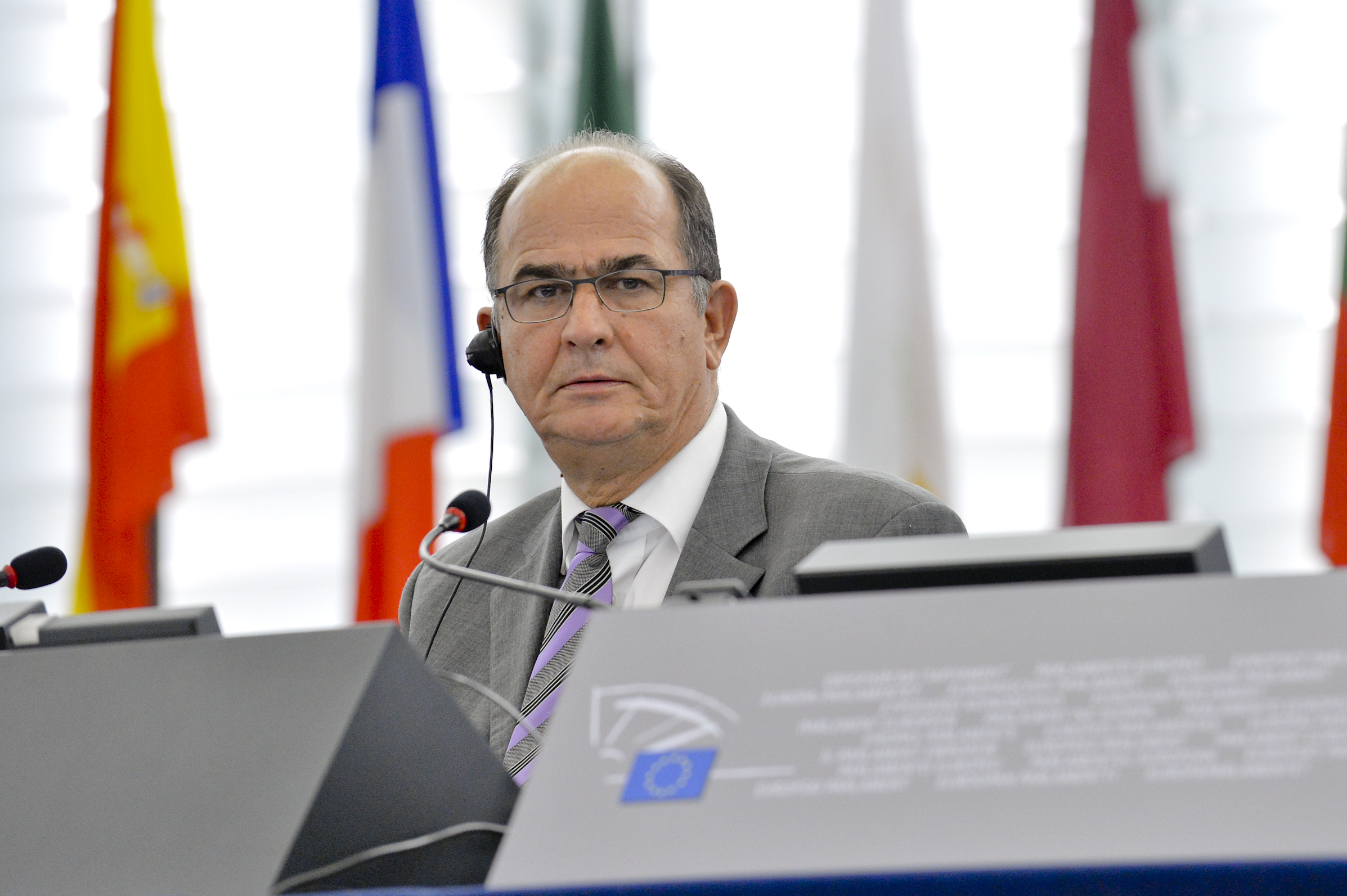
Georgios Papastamkos

Georgios Papastamkos (Greek: Γεώργιος Παπαστάμκος) (born 5 March 1955 in Platanorrevma, West Macedonia) is a Greek politician and was a Member of the European Parliament (MEP) from 2004 to 2014 for New Democracy, part of the European People's Party.
