= Georgios Kontaris =

Georgios Kontaris (Greek: Γεώργιος Κονταρής), was born in Servia, Greece and was a 17th-century Scholar and a monk; he studied Latin and Italian in Venice (1665), becoming a master of philosophy. He was a school principal in Kozani (1668–1678), later teacher in Servia. Elected Metropolitan of Servia and Kozani with the name of Gregory (1673), Metropolitan of Athens (1690). He was among the first to show interest in Ancient Greek history.

He wrote the book "H Ιστορία των Αθηνών" (English: The History of Athens) in 1676 in Venice as well as translating Italian works into the Greek language.
