= Sotiriou =

Sotiriou is a surname. Notable people with the surname include:

- Andreas Sotiriou (born 1968), Cypriot footballer
- Dido Sotiriou (1909–2004), Greek novelist, journalist, and playwright
- Dimitrios Sotiriou (born 1987), Greek footballer
- Evangelia Sotiriou (born 1980), Greek rhythmic gymnast
- Georgios Sotiriou (1880–1965), Greek archaeologist, byzantinologist and university professor
- Katerina Sotiriou (born 1984), Greek basketball player
- Pieros Sotiriou (born 1993), Cypriot footballer
- Ruel Sotiriou (born 2000), Cypriot footballer
- Zisis Sotiriou, Greek revolutionary
