= Kantakouzenos (disambiguation) =

The Kantakouzenos family, Latinized as Cantacuzenus, Anglicized as Cantacuzene (from French Cantacuzène) was one of the most prominent noble families of the Byzantine Empire in the last centuries of its existence.

Kantakouzenos and its variants are also contemporary surnames. They may refer to:

== Kantakouzenos ==
- Andronikos Palaiologos Kantakouzenos (died 1453), Byzantine statesman
- Andronikos Kantakouzenos (1553–1601) (1553–1601), Ottoman and Wallachian statesman
- Demetrios I Kantakouzenos (c. 1343–1384), governor of the Morea and the grandson of Emperor John VI Kantakouzenos
- George Palaiologos Kantakouzenos (c. 1390–1456/59), Byzantine aristocrat
- Irene Kantakouzene (c. 1400–1457), known simply as Despotess Jerina[a], wife of Serbian Despot Đurađ Branković. In Serbian folk legends, she is the founder of many fortresses in Serbia.
- Janja Kantakouzenos (c. 1435–1477), nobleman from the mine town of Novo Brdo (then Serbian Despotate)
- John VI Kantakouzenos, or Cantacuzenus, or Cantacuzene (c. 1292–1383), Greek nobleman, statesman, and general
- John Kantakouzenos (sebastos) (died 1176), Byzantine general
- John Kantakouzenos (Caesar) (fl. 1185/86), brother-in-law of Emperor Isaac II Angelos
- John Kantakouzenos (despot) (fl. c. 1342 – 1380), Byzantine prince
- John Kantakouzenos (pinkernes) (fl. 1244–1250), Byzantine aristocrat
- John Kantakouzenos of Novo Brdo (c. 1435 – 1477), Greek-Serbian nobleman
- Manuel Kantakouzenos or Cantacuzenus (c. 1326–1380), Despotēs in the Despotate of Morea or the Peloponnese from 25 October 1349 to his death and a contender to the Principality of Achaia
- Manuel Kantakouzenos (usurper), Greek rebel leader who started a revolt against the Palaiologos family in the Byzantine Despotate of the Morea
- Matthew Kantakouzenos or Cantacuzenus (c. 1325–1383), Byzantine Emperor from 1353 to 1357.
- Michael Kantakouzenos (died 1264), Byzantine general
- Michael Kantakouzenos (died 1316), Byzantine governor in the Morea, father of John VI Kantakouzenos
- Michael Kantakouzenos Şeytanoğlu (died 1578), Phanariote Greek magnate, founder of the modern branch of the Kantakouzenos family
- Theodore Kantakouzenos (c. 1361–1410), Byzantine nobleman
- Thomas Kantakouzenos (died 1463), Byzantine aristocrat

== Cantacuzene / Cantacuzène ==
- Julia Dent Cantacuzène Spiransky-Grant or Princess Cantacuzène, Countess Spéransky (1876–1975), American author and historian
- Prince Mikhail Cantacuzène or Count Speransky (1875–1955), Russian general
- Princess Marie Cantacuzène (1820-1898), Romanian model and wife of Pierre Puvis de Chavannes
- Princess Elsa Cantacuzene (née Elsa Bruckmann)
- Princess Kassandra Cantacuzene, mother of Antiochus Kantemir

Princess Irina Cantacuzene (1895-1945) and Princess Olga Cantacuzene (1899-1983), granddaughters of Catherine Chislova

== See also ==
- Cantacuzino family of Wallachia
