= Servia-Velventos =

Servia–Velventos Σέρβια-Βελβεντός
- Municipality
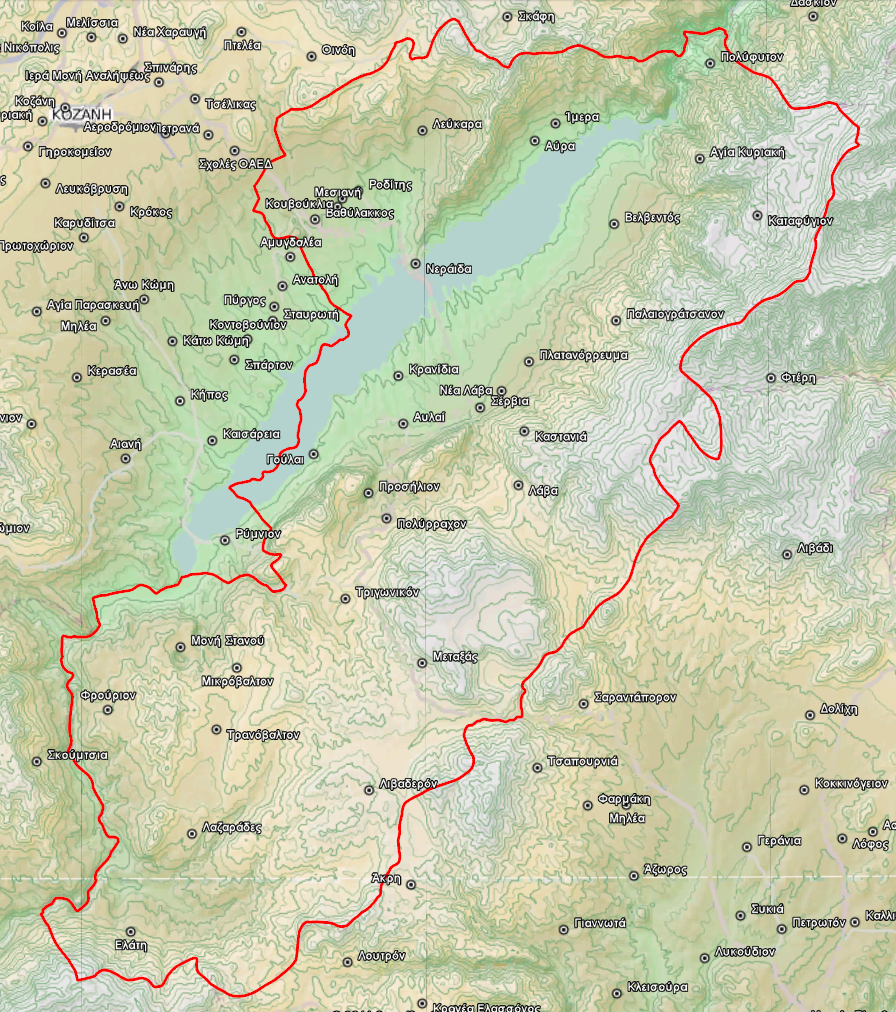

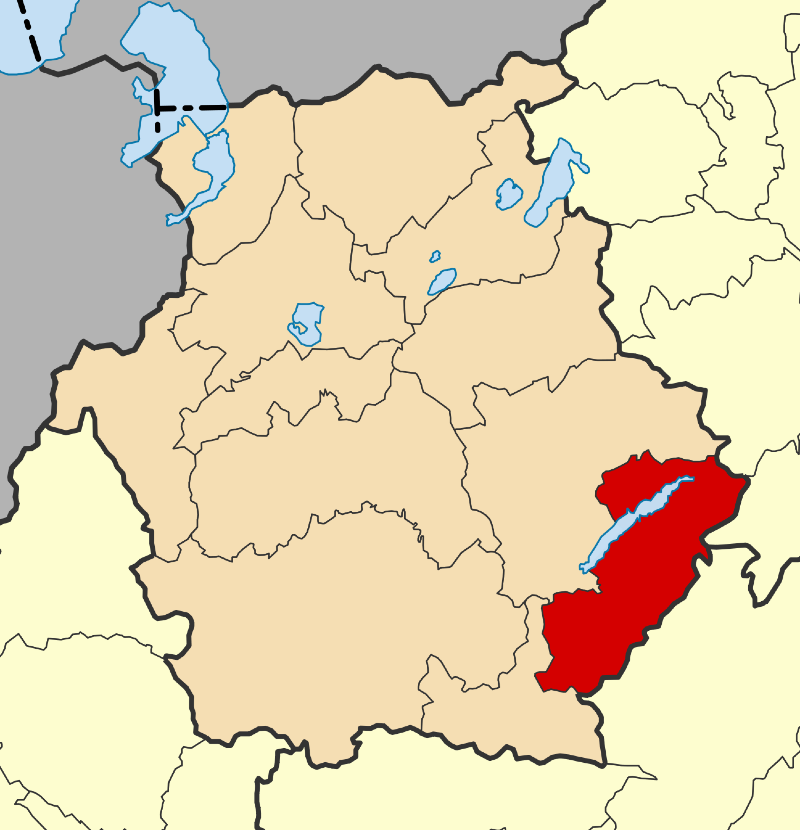

- Location within Greece
- Coordinates: 40°11′N 22°0′E
- Country: Greece
- Administrative region: West Macedonia
- Regional unit: Kozani

Area
  - Municipality: 728.17 km^{2} (281.15 sq mi)

Population (2011)
  - Municipality: 14,830
  - Density: 20.37/km^{2} (52.75/sq mi)
- Time zone: UTC+2 (EET)
  - Summer (DST): UTC+3 (EEST)
- Postal code: 50500
- Area code: 24640
- Vehicle registration: KZ

Servia–Velventos (Greek: Σέρβια-Βελβεντός, Sérvia-Velventós) is a former municipality in the Kozani regional unit, Greece, that existed between 2011 and 2019. The seat of the municipality was the town Servia. The municipality has an area of 728.166 km^{2}.

== Municipality ==
The municipality Servia–Velventos was formed at the 2011 local government reform by the merger of the following 4 former municipalities, that became municipal units:

- Kamvounia
- Livadero
- Servia
- Velventos

At the 2019 local government reform, the municipality was split into two municipalities: Servia (containing the municipal units Servia, Kamvounia and Livadero) and Velventos.
