= John Kantakouzenos (disambiguation) =

John Kantakouzenos, Cantacuzene or Cantacuzenus (Greek: Ἱωάννης Καντακουζηνός) can refer to:

- John VI Kantakouzenos (c. 1292 – 1383), Byzantine emperor and historian
- John Kantakouzenos (sebastos) (died 1176), Byzantine general
- John Kantakouzenos (Caesar) (fl. 1185/86), brother-in-law of Emperor Isaac II Angelos
- John Kantakouzenos (despot) (fl. c. 1342 – 1380), Byzantine prince
- John Kantakouzenos (pinkernes) (fl. 1244–1250), Byzantine aristocrat
- John Kantakouzenos of Novo Brdo (c. 1435 – 1477), Greek-Serbian nobleman
