= Kranidia =

Village in Servia, Greece

Kranidia Κρανίδια
- Community
- Location within Greece
- Coordinates: 40°11′47″N 21°57′30″E
- Country: Greece
- Administrative region: Western Macedonia
- Regional unit: Kozani
- Municipality: Servia
- Municipal unit: Servia

Population (2021)
  - Community: 324
- Time zone: UTC+2 (EET)
  - Summer (DST): UTC+3 (EEST)
- Postal code: 50500
- Area code: +30 2464

Kranidia is a village located on the south bank of the river Aliakmon in Servia municipality, Kozani regional unit, in the Greek region of Macedonia. It is situated at an altitude of 320 meters above sea level. At the 2021 census the population was 324.

The regional capital, Kozani, is 31 km away.
