= Trigoniko =

Village in Kozani regional unit in the Greek region of Macedonia

Trigoniko Τριγωνικό
- Community
- Location within Greece
- Coordinates: 40°06′39″N 21°55′58″E
- Country: Greece
- Administrative region: Western Macedonia
- Regional unit: Kozani
- Municipality: Servia
- Municipal unit: Servia

Population (2021)
  - Community: 239
- Time zone: UTC+2 (EET)
  - Summer (DST): UTC+3 (EEST)
- Postal code: 50500
- Area code: +30 2464

Trigoniko (Greek: Τριγωνικό) is a village located in Servia municipality, Kozani regional unit, in the Greek region of Macedonia. It is situated at an altitude of 750 meters above sea level. At the 2021 census the population was 239.

The regional capital, Kozani, is 41 km away.
