= Metaxas, Greece =

Village in Greece

Metaxas Μεταξάς
- Community
- Location within Greece
- Coordinates: 40°05′01″N 21°58′17″E
- Country: Greece
- Administrative region: Western Macedonia
- Regional unit: Kozani
- Municipality: Servia
- Municipal unit: Servia

Population (2021)
  - Community: 204
- Time zone: UTC+2 (EET)
  - Summer (DST): UTC+3 (EEST)
- Postal code: 50500
- Area code: +30 2464

Metaxas is a village located in Servia municipality, Kozani regional unit, in the Greek region of Macedonia. It is situated at an altitude of 2,060 meters above sea level. At the 2021 census the population was 204.

The regional capital, Kozani, is 45 km away.
