= Avles =

Avles Αυλές
- Community
- Location within Greece
- Coordinates: 40°10.6′N 21°57.8′E
- Country: Greece
- Administrative region: West Macedonia
- Regional unit: Kozani
- Municipality: Servia
- Municipal unit: Servia
- Elevation: 360 m (1,180 ft)

Population (2021)
  - Community: 236
- Time zone: UTC+2 (EET)
  - Summer (DST): UTC+3 (EEST)
- Postal code: 505 00
- Area code: +30-2464
- Vehicle registration: ΚΖ

Avles (Greek: Αυλές) is a village and a community of the municipality of Servia. The 2021 census recorded 236 inhabitants in the village.
