= Bosniak-Serb Alliance =

Political party in the Sandžak region of Serbia

Bosniak-Serb Alliance: Bošnjačko-srpski savez; Бошњачко-српски савез
- Abbreviation: BOSS
- President: Samir Tandir
- Founded: 9 October 2022
- Split from: Justice and Reconciliation Party
- National affiliation: Aleksandar Vučić – United Serbia (2026)
- Colours: Grey
- National Assembly: 1 / 250
- Bosniak National Council: 1 / 35

Website
- boss.org.rs

The Bosniak-Serb Alliance (Serbian: Бошњачко-српски савез, romanized: Bošnjačko-srpski savez; abbr. BOSS) is a regionalist political party in the Sandžak region of Serbia. Founded in 2022 by Samir Tandir after he left the Justice and Reconciliation Party, it contested the 2026 parliamentary election on the Serbian Progressive Party-led "Aleksandar Vučić – United Serbia" list, on which Tandir was elected to the National Assembly.

== History ==
Samir Tandir was a member of the SPP and its predecessor parties from 2010 to 2022, and a prominent ally of Chief Mufti Muamer Zukorlić. After Zukorlić died in November 2021, the leadership of the SPP passed to his son, Usame Zukorlić. Tandir had a poor relationship with the party's new leadership and did not seek re-election to the National Assembly in 2022. He resigned from the party after the election, accusing it of carrying out "North Korea-style purges" of dissenters and of moving away from its original purpose.

On leaving the SPP, Tandir announced that he would establish a new party, the Bosniak-Serb Alliance. The party was launched on 9 October 2022, with Tandir chosen as president of its initiative committee.

In the 2022 election for the Bosniak National Council, a list aligned with the party, "Alliance for Sandžak and Good Bosniaks", led by Admir Muratović, an independent member of the Novi Pazar City Assembly, won 1,791 votes and one of the 35 seats.

In the 2026 parliamentary election, the party ran on the "Aleksandar Vučić – United Serbia" list, on which Tandir was 43rd, and he was elected when the list won 103 seats. His mandate was confirmed on 17 November 2026, and he joined the "Aleksandar Vučić – Serbia is Winning" parliamentary group in the 15th National Assembly. For the 2026 Bosniak National Council election, Tandir led the list "United Bosniaks – Samir Tandir".

== Electoral performance ==
=== Parliamentary elections ===
National Assembly
Year	Leader	Popular vote	% of popular vote	#	# of seats	Seat change	Coalition	Status	Ref.
2026	Samir Tandir	1,731,323	39.48%	2nd	1 / 250	▲1	AV–US	TBA	

=== Bosniak National Council elections ===
Bosniak National Council
Year	List leader	Popular vote	% of popular vote	# of seats	Seat change	Ref.
2022	Admir Muratović	1,791	3.88%	1 / 35	▲1	
2026	Samir Tandir	902	2.51%	0 / 35	▼1	
