= Imera, Kozani =

Village in Western Macedonia, Greece

Imera Ίμερα
- Community
- Location within Greece
- Coordinates: 40°17′37″N 22°2′29″E
- Country: Greece
- Administrative region: Western Macedonia
- Regional unit: Kozani
- Municipality: Servia
- Municipal unit: Servia
- Elevation: 353 m (1,158 ft)

Population (2021)
  - Community: 154
- Time zone: UTC+2 (EET)
  - Summer (DST): UTC+3 (EEST)
- Postal code: 50100
- Area code: +30-24640

Imera (Greek: Ίμερα) is a community in Servia municipality, Kozani regional unit, in the Greek region of Macedonia. It consists of the settlements Imera and Avra. The village Imera is situated at an altitude of 353 meters above sea level. At the 2021 census the population was 154.
