= Polyrracho =

Village in Kozani regional unit in the Greek region of Macedonia

Polyrracho Πολύρραχο
- Community
- Location within Greece
- Coordinates: 40°08′25″N 21°57′11″E
- Country: Greece
- Administrative region: Western Macedonia
- Regional unit: Kozani
- Municipality: Servia
- Municipal unit: Servia

Population (2021)
  - Community: 163
- Time zone: UTC+2 (EET)
  - Summer (DST): UTC+3 (EEST)
- Postal code: 50500
- Area code: +30 2464

Polyrracho (Greek: Πολύρραχο) is a village located in Servia municipality, Kozani regional unit, in the Greek region of Macedonia. It is situated at an altitude of 567 meters. The regional capital, Kozani, is 36 km away.
