= Goules =

Goules Γούλες
- Community
- Location within Greece
- Coordinates: 40°09′36″N 21°54′46″E
- Country: Greece
- Administrative region: Western Macedonia
- Regional unit: Kozani
- Municipality: Servia
- Municipal unit: Servia

Population (2021)
  - Community: 122
- Time zone: UTC+2 (EET)
  - Summer (DST): UTC+3 (EEST)
- Postal code: 50500
- Area code: +30 2464

Goules (Greek: Γούλες) is a village located on the southeast bank of the river Aliakmon in Servia municipality, Kozani regional unit, in the Greek region of Macedonia. It is situated at an altitude of 290 meters above sea level. At the 2021 census the population was 122.
