= Mesiani =

Mesiani Μεσιανή
- Community
- Location within Greece
- Coordinates: 40°15′42″N 21°55′36″E
- Country: Greece
- Administrative region: Western Macedonia
- Regional unit: Kozani
- Municipality: Servia
- Municipal unit: Servia

Population (2021)
  - Community: 238
- Time zone: UTC+2 (EET)
  - Summer (DST): UTC+3 (EEST)
- Postal code: 50150

Mesiani (Greek: Μεσιανή) is a village located in Servia municipality, Kozani regional unit, in the Greek region of Macedonia. It is situated at an altitude of 395 meters above sea level. At the 2021 census the population was 238.

The regional capital, Kozani, is 15 km away.
