= Polyfyto =

Polyfyto Πολύφυτο
- Community
- Location within Greece
- Coordinates: 40°19.05′N 22°7.1′E
- Country: Greece
- Administrative region: West Macedonia
- Regional unit: Kozani
- Municipality: Velventos
- Elevation: 320 m (1,050 ft)

Population (2021)
  - Community: 7
- Time zone: UTC+2 (EET)
  - Summer (DST): UTC+3 (EEST)
- Postal code: 504 00
- Area code: +30-2464
- Vehicle registration: ΚΖ

Polyfyto (Greek: Πολύφυτο) is a village and a community in the regional unit of Kozani, northern Greece. It is part of the municipality of Velventos. The 2021 census recorded 14 inhabitants in the village. It lies near the river Aliakmon, and the dam in that river which created Lake Polyfyto.
