= Vathylakkos, Kozani =

Vathylakkos Βαθύλακκος
- Community
- Location within Greece
- Coordinates: 40°15.4′N 21°55′E
- Country: Greece
- Administrative region: West Macedonia
- Regional unit: Kozani
- Municipality: Servia
- Municipal unit: Servia

Area
  - Community: 16.498 km^{2} (6.370 sq mi)
- Elevation: 420 m (1,380 ft)

Population (2021)
  - Community: 505
  - Density: 30.6/km^{2} (79.3/sq mi)
- Time zone: UTC+2 (EET)
  - Summer (DST): UTC+3 (EEST)
- Postal code: 501 00
- Area code: +30-2461
- Vehicle registration: KZ

Vathylakkos (Greek: Βαθύλακκος) is a village and a community of the municipality of Servia. The 2021 census recorded 505 inhabitants in the community. The community of Vathylakkos covers an area of 16.498 km^{2}.

== See also ==
- List of settlements in the Kozani regional unit
