= Agia Kyriaki, Kozani =

Agia Kyriaki Αγία Κυριακή
- Community
- Location within Greece
- Coordinates: 40.281°N 22.114°E
- Country: Greece
- Administrative region: Western Macedonia
- Regional unit: Kozani
- Municipality: Velventos

Population (2021)
  - Community: 37
- Time zone: UTC+2 (EET)
  - Summer (DST): UTC+3 (EEST)

Agia Kyriaki (Greek: Αγία Κυριακή, Agía Kyriakí) is a village in the Kozani regional unit, Greece. It is part of the Velventos municipality.
