= Metropolis of Servia and Kozani =

Metropolis of Servia and Kozani Ιερά Μητρόπολις Σερβίων και Κοζάνης

Location
- Ecclesiastical province: Kozani
- Archdeaconries: Kozani, Aeani, Drepano, Krokos, Servia, Velvendo

Statistics
- Parishes: 94
- Churches: 512

Information
- Cathedral: St. Nicholas Cathedral

Current leadership
- Bishop: Pavlos Papalexiou

Website
- imsk.gr

The Holy Metropolis of Servia and Kozani (Greek: Ιερά Μητρόπολις Σερβίων και Κοζάνης, Iera Mitropolis Servion kai Kozanis) is an Orthodox Christian diocese located in West Macedonia, Greece, with the bishop's seat at Kozani. Its archdeaconries include the cities of Kozani, Aiani, Drepano, Krokos, Servia and Velvendos. As of 2012 the Bishop of the Holy Diocese of Servia and Kozani was Pavlos Papalexiou.

== History ==
It was first mentioned in the fifth century as the Bishopric of Caesarea under the jurisdiction of the Diocese of Larissa. An Ancient Greek marble tombstone was found having the inscription: "...προεδρίαν έλαχεν τη Εκκλησία Καισάρων πόλεως Μακεδόνιος έστιν ούτος ανήρ τα παντ’ εύφημος ος Επισκοπήσας έτη εν μήνα ένα του τήδε βίου εκδημήσας μηνί Ιανουαρίω ΚΓ′ Ινδικτιώνος ΙΑ′ προς Θεόν ενεδήμησεν...". Archaeologists infer that the tombstone was written in the 5th century and that the Bishopric of Caesarea was established in the 4th century, when persecution against Christians ceased.

The Bishopric of Caesarea was moved to Servia from the 9th century onwards. It is Leo VI the Wise who first mentions the new "Bishopric of Servia", which kept its name until 1745. The seat was then moved to Kozani and the title was changed to Bishopric of Servia and Kozani being under the jurisdiction of the Metropolitan see of Thessalonica. In 1882 the bishopric was promoted to a Metropolis and from then has been under the jurisdiction of the Ecumenical Patriarchate.

In 1923, when Greek refugees from Asia Minor fled to Kozani, the House of the Diocese was used as a hospital and temporary shelter. During the German occupation of Greece (1941–44) the House of the Diocese was occupied by German troops and much of its historical archive was destroyed or lost.

== Monasteries ==
There are 5 monasteries in the Diocese:

- Holy Trinity at Lariou (male)
- St. Antony at Kastania of Servia (male)
- St. Nektarios at Palaiogratsano (male)
- Holy Theotokos at Zidani (female)
- Holy Trinity at Velvendos (female)

The local saints of the Diocese are Theodora of Arta and Varadatos.

== Bibliography ==
- Kiminas, Demetrius (2009). The Ecumenical Patriarchate: A History of Its Metropolitanates with Annotated Hierarch Catalogs. Wildside Press LLC. ISBN 9781434458766.
