= Lefkara, Kozani =

Village and community of Servia, Greece

Lefkara Λεύκαρα
- Community
- Location within Greece
- Coordinates: 40°17.5′N 21°58.3′E
- Country: Greece
- Administrative region: West Macedonia
- Regional unit: Kozani
- Municipality: Servia
- Municipal unit: Servia

Area
  - Community: 25.25 km^{2} (9.75 sq mi)
- Elevation: 450 m (1,480 ft)

Population (2021)
  - Community: 145
  - Density: 5.74/km^{2} (14.9/sq mi)
- Time zone: UTC+2 (EET)
  - Summer (DST): UTC+3 (EEST)
- Postal code: 501 00
- Area code: +30-2461
- Vehicle registration: ΚΖ

Lefkara (Greek: Λεύκαρα) is a village and a community of the municipality of Servia. The 2021 census recorded 145 inhabitants in the village. The community of Lefkara covers an area of 25.25 km^{2}.

== See also ==
- List of settlements in the Kozani regional unit
