= Platanorrevma =

Human settlement in Greece

Platanorrevma Πλατανόρρευμα
- Community
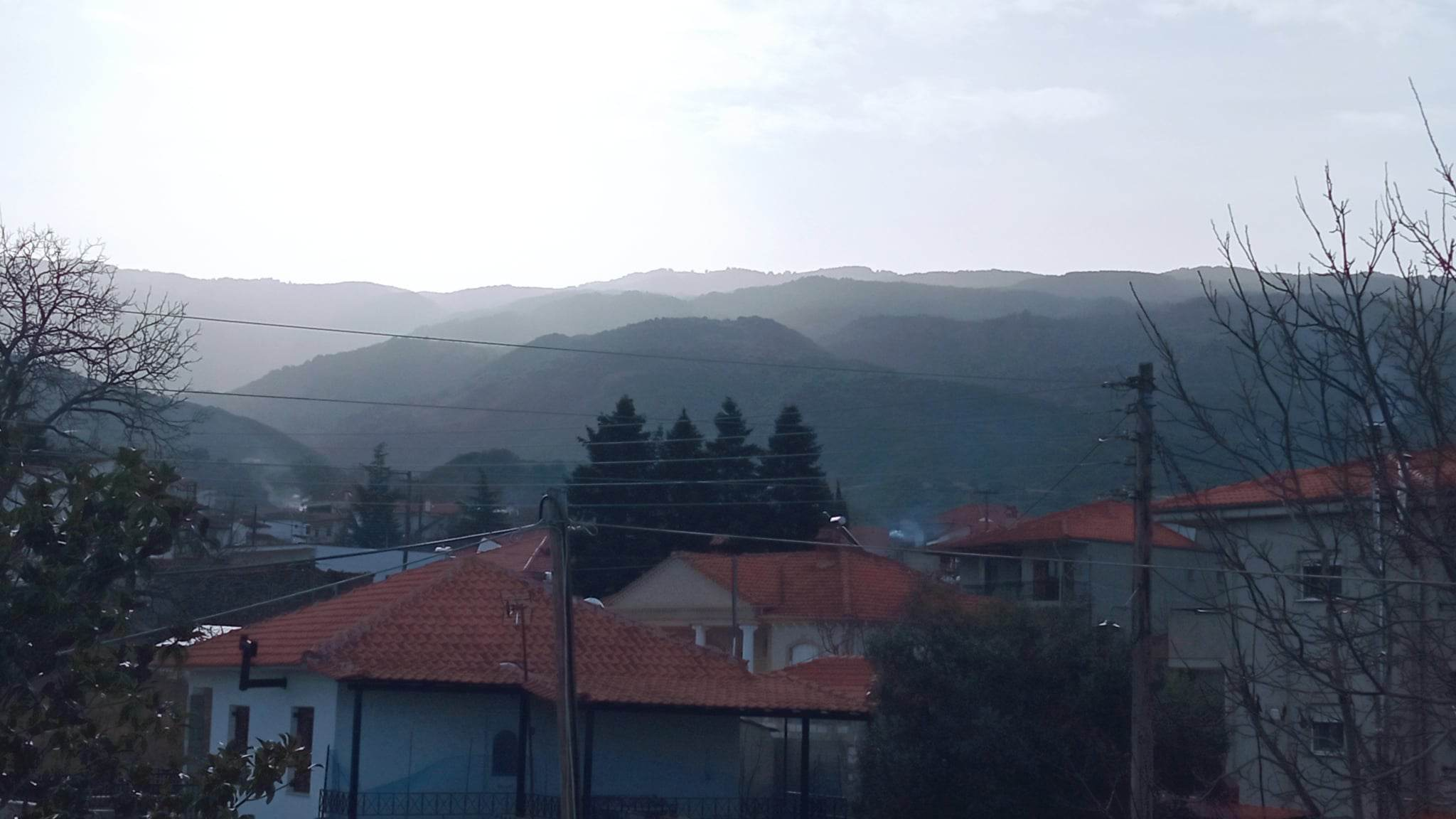
- The ascending village of Platanorrevma

- Location within Greece
- Coordinates: 40°12′05″N 22°01′37″E
- Country: Greece
- Administrative region: Western Macedonia
- Regional unit: Kozani
- Municipality: Servia
- Municipal unit: Servia

Population (2021)
  - Community: 864
- Time zone: UTC+2 (EET)
  - Summer (DST): UTC+3 (EEST)
- Postal code: 50500
- Area code: +30 2464

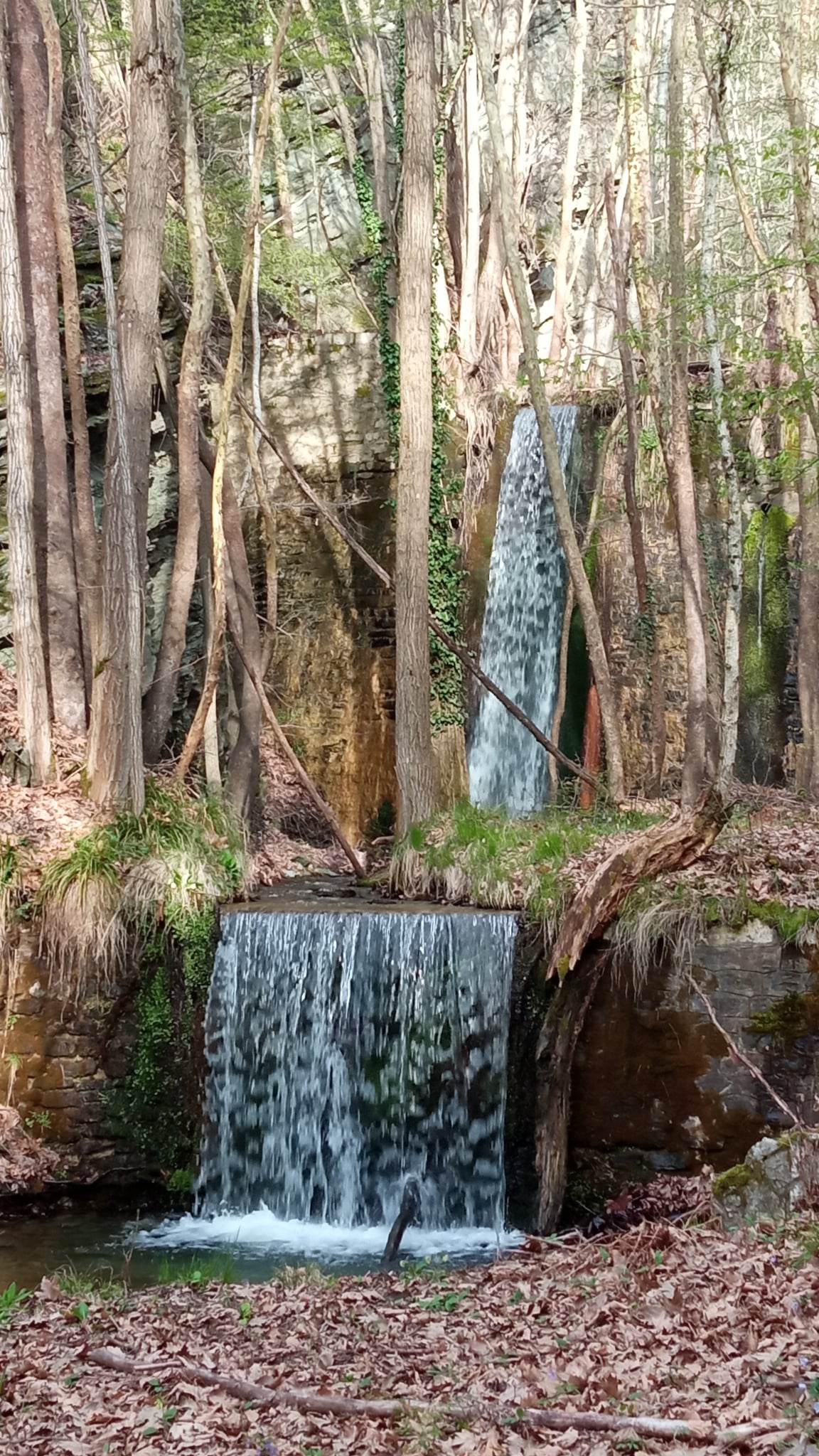
One of many waterfalls of Tranos Lakkos Path

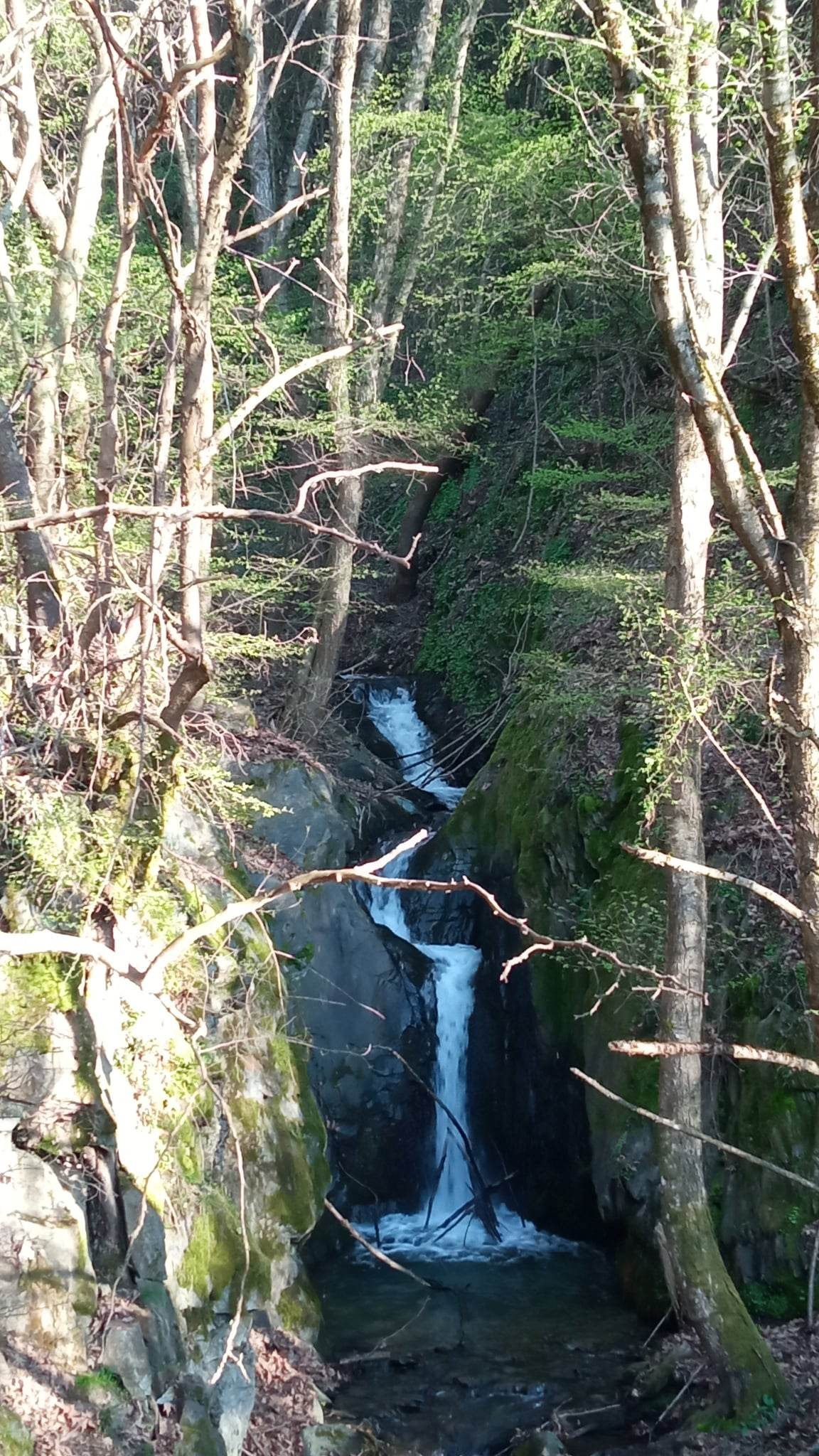
One of the many waterfalls in the area

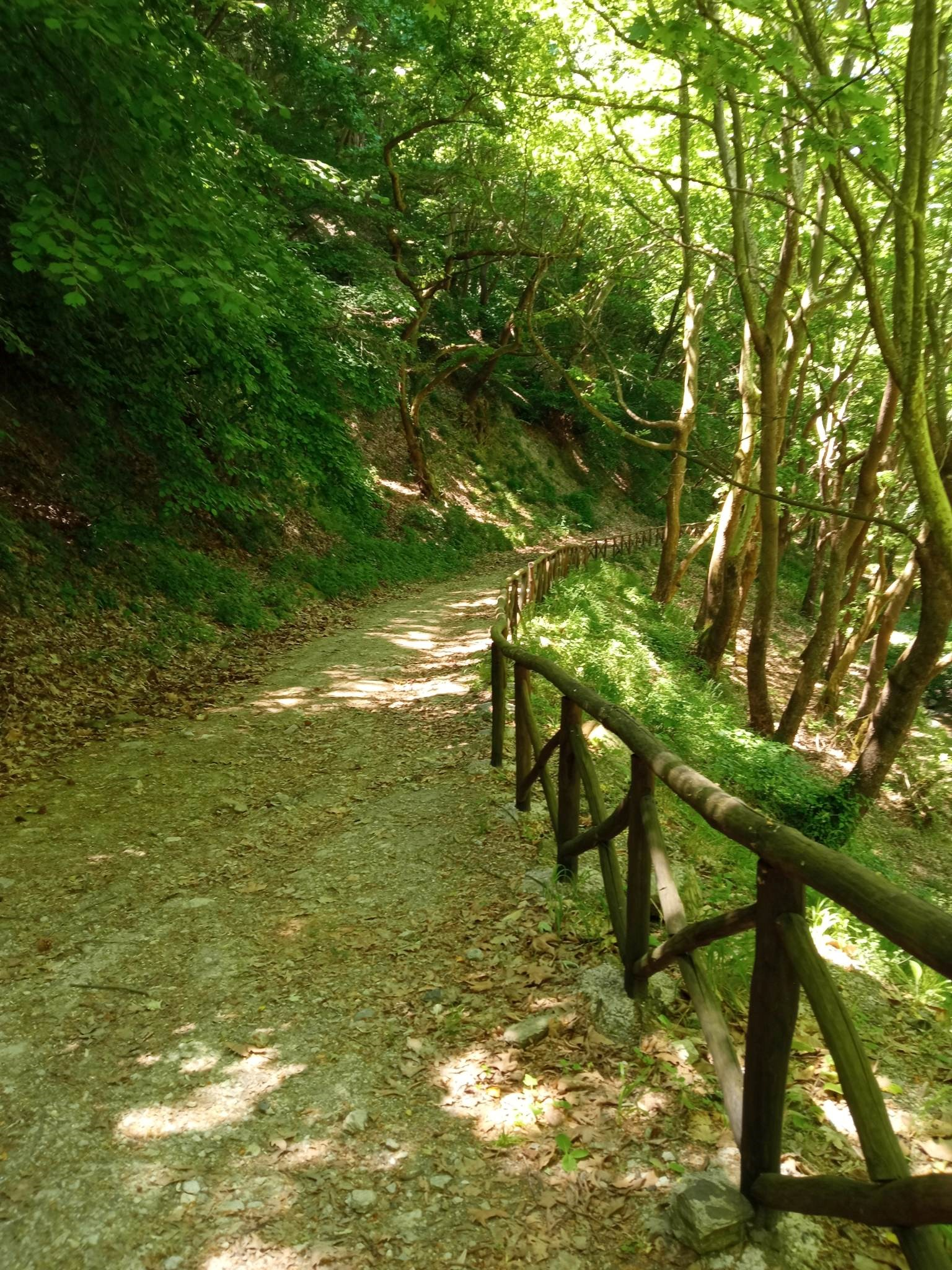
A trail in the area

Platanorrevma (Greek: Πλατανόρρευμα, also: Platanórema) is a village located alongside the Pierian Mountains and Polifytos artificial lake in Servia municipality, Kozani regional unit, in the Greek region of Macedonia. It was named Platanorevma because of the existence of plane trees and streams that cross the village.

It is one of the biggest villages by population in the Servia municipality and is 3 km (1.9 mi) away from Servia, 11 km (6.8 mi) from Velvendos and 31 km (19 mi) from the regional capital, Kozani. It situated at an altitude of 490 m (1,610 ft). It was created by the unification of three settlements, Ortaki that was in the same area and Palaiogratsano, Moschohori mountainous settlements of Pieria.

Platanorrevma has today many clubs in function such as sport club "Ermis", mountaineering club "Krya", women's club "Olympia" and cultural club of Platanorrevma. Also, Platanorrevma is known for the hiking path "Tranos Lakkos" 9.5 km (5.9 mi) length which passes through a beautiful natural landscape of stream and waterfalls. At the 2021 census the population was 864.
