= Sanjak of Serfiğe =

Sanjak of Serfiğe Ottoman Turkish: Liva-i Serfiğe
- Sanjak of the Ottoman Empire
- 1881–1912
- Sanjak of Serfiğe, darkest green, late 19th century
- Capital: Servia
- History
  - Established: 1881
  - First Balkan War: 1912
Preceded by	Succeeded by
Sanjak of Tirhala; Manastir Vilayet	Kingdom of Greece
- Today part of: Greece

The Sanjak of Serfiğe (Greek: Σαντζάκι/Υποδιοίκησις Σερβίων) was a second-level Ottoman province (sanjak or liva) centred on the town of Serfiğe (Servia) in western Macedonia, now part of Greece.

The sanjak was founded in 1881, after the Greek annexation of Thessaly (the sanjak of Tirhala), initially as an independent province, and after 1889 as part of Manastir Vilayet. In 1912, the province encompassed six kazas (districts): Nasliç (Voio), Serfiğe itself, Kozana (Kozani), Kayalar (Ptolemaida), Nasliğ (Neapoli, Kozani), Grebene (Grevena) and Alasonya (Elassona).

The sanjak was conquered by the Greek Army in October 1912, during the First Balkan War.
