= Roditis, Kozani =

Roditis Ροδίτης
- Community
- Location within Greece
- Coordinates: 40°16.1′N 21°56.3′E
- Country: Greece
- Administrative region: West Macedonia
- Regional unit: Kozani
- Municipality: Servia
- Municipal unit: Servia
- Elevation: 391 m (1,283 ft)

Population (2021)
  - Community: 256
- Time zone: UTC+2 (EET)
  - Summer (DST): UTC+3 (EEST)
- Postal code: 501 50
- Vehicle registration: ΚΖ

Roditis (Greek: Ροδίτης) is a village and a community of the municipality of Servia. The 2021 census recorded 256 inhabitants in the community, which consists of the settlements Roditis and Kouvouklia.
