= Kamvounia =

Kamvounia Καμβούνια
- Municipal unit
- Location within the regional unit

- Location within Greece
- Coordinates: 40°04′N 21°51′E
- Country: Greece
- Administrative region: West Macedonia
- Regional unit: Kozani
- Municipality: Servia

Area
  - Municipal unit: 149.535 km^{2} (57.736 sq mi)

Population (2021)
  - Municipal unit: 1,290
  - Municipal unit density: 8.63/km^{2} (22.3/sq mi)
- Time zone: UTC+2 (EET)
  - Summer (DST): UTC+3 (EEST)
- Postal code: 504 00
- Area code: 02464
- Vehicle registration: KZ

Kamvounia (Greek: Καμβούνια) is a former municipality in Kozani regional unit, West Macedonia, Greece. From 2011 to 2019 it was part of the municipality Servia-Velventos, of which it was a municipal unit. It is now a municipal unit of the municipality of Servia.

The municipal unit has an area of 149.535 km^{2}. The 2021 census recorded 1,290 residents in the municipal unit. The seat of the municipality was in Tranovalto.
