= Samir Tandir =

Serbian politician

- Самир Тандир
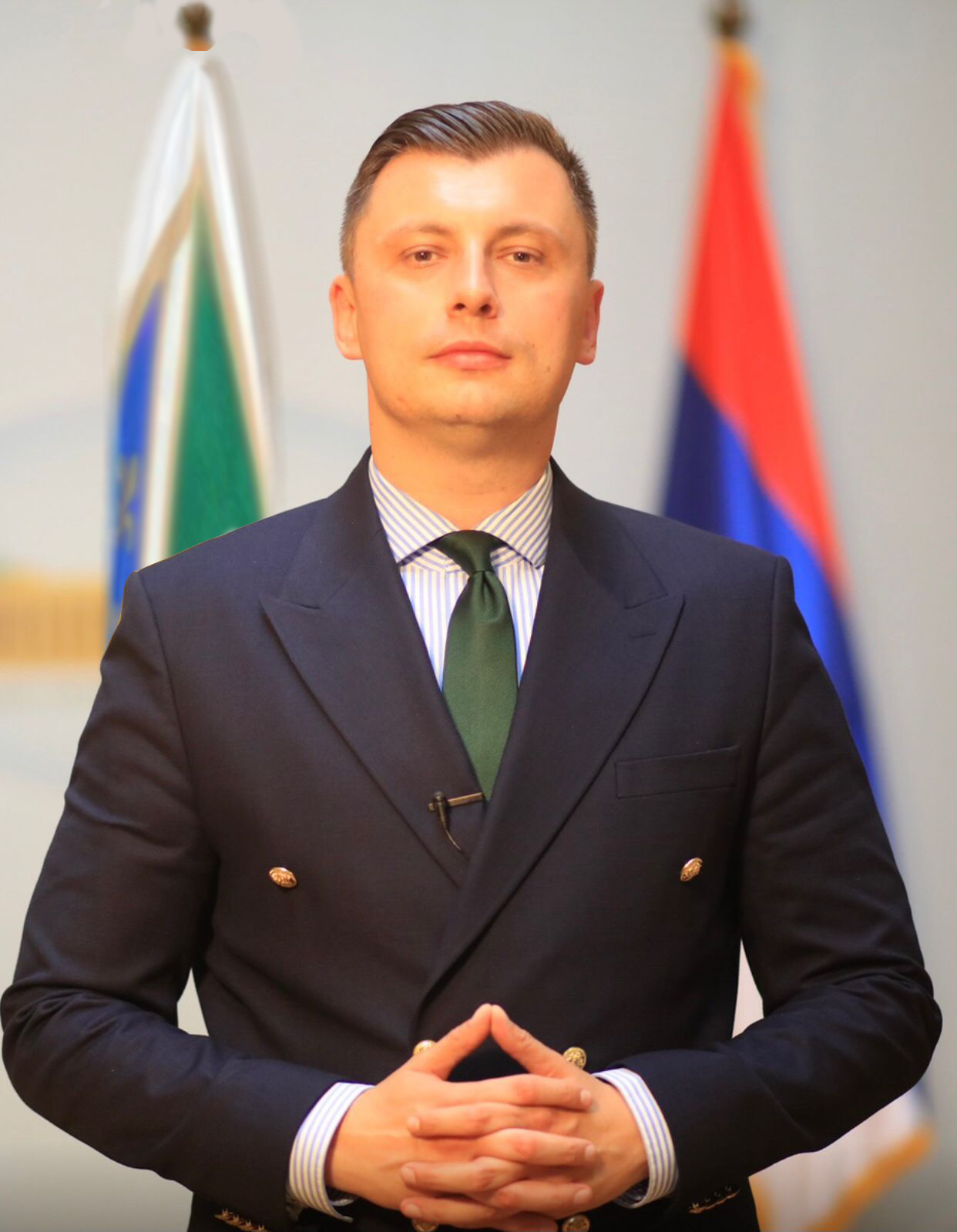

Member of the National Assembly of the Republic of Serbia
- In office 3 August 2020 – 1 August 2022

Personal details
- Born: 3 March 1984 (age 42) Prijepolje, SR Serbia, SFR Yugoslavia
- Party: BDZ (2010–13); BDZ Sandžak (2013–17); SPP (2017–22); BOSS (2022–present)
- Occupation: Politician

Samir Tandir (Serbian Cyrillic: Самир Тандир; born 3 March 1984) is a Serbian politician from the country's Bosniak community. He was a leading figure in Muamer Zukorlić's political movement for several years and served in the Serbian parliament from 2020 to 2022 as a member of the Justice and Reconciliation Party (SPP).

Tandir became alienated from the SPP's new leadership after Muamer Zukorlić's death in 2021. In October 2022, he started a new political party called the Bosniak-Serb Alliance (BOSS).

He is currently the vice-president of the Prijepolje municipal assembly.

== Early life and private career ==
Tandir was born in Prijepolje, in the Raška region of what was then the Socialist Republic of Serbia in the Socialist Federal Republic of Yugoslavia. He is a graduate of the Faculty of Economics in Novi Pazar and was described in 2021 as working toward a master's degree from the same institution. Tandir was a teacher of religious studies from 2006 to 2010 and served as an Imam in Prijepolje from 2006 to 2012, when he resigned to focus on his political work.

== Politician ==
=== Bosniak National Council (2010–18) ===
Tandir served as secretary for Chief Mufti Muamer Zukorlić from 2008 to 2010. From 2009 to 2012, he was Zukorlić's official spokesperson and president of the executive board of Zukorlić's Bosniak Cultural Community.

Serbia organized the first direct elections for its national minority councils in 2010. The Bosniak Cultural Community contested the election for the Bosniak National Council, and its electoral list won seventeen mandates, as against thirteen for the Bosniak List of Sulejman Ugljanin and five for the Bosniak Renaissance group of Rasim Ljajić. Tandir was among the candidates elected for the Bosniak Cultural Community. The results were extremely contentious, and the legitimacy of the Bosniak Cultural Community's victory was contested by both the Serbian government and Ugljanin's party. Zukorlić's group held a constituent session for the council on 7 July 2010, which was also attended by two delegates from Bosniak Renaissance. This iteration of the council continued to meet afterward but was not recognized by the Serbian government. Tandir was president of the breakaway council's executive board from 2010 to 2012 and led the breakaway council itself from 2012 to 2014. In December 2010, he was part of a delegation that met with Bakir Izetbegović, the Bosniak member of Bosnia and Herzegovina's collective presidency, to seek international support on Bosniak and Sandžak issues in Serbia.

Tandir was a founding member of the Bosniak Democratic Union (BDZ) in late 2010 and became a party vice-president in 2012. The BDZ contested the 2012 Serbian parliamentary election as part of the All Together (Sve Zajedno) alliance of national minority parties. Tandir received the second position on the alliance's list, after BDZ leader Emir Elfić. The list won a single seat, which was automatically assigned to Elfić.

In 2013, the BDZ experienced a split between supporters of Elfić and supporters of Zukorlić. Tandir sided with Zukorlić and became a founding member of the breakaway Bosniak Democratic Union of Sandžak (BDZ Sandžak) later in the year. In 2014, he was chosen as a party vice-president. The BDZ Sandžak contested the 2014 parliamentary election on the electoral list of the Liberal Democratic Party (LDP), and Tandir was included in the thirteenth position. Election from this position was a credible prospect, but the list did not cross the electoral threshold for assembly representation.

A new election for the Bosniak National Council took place in 2014, and Tandir appeared in the seventh position on Zukorlić's For Bosniaks, Sandžak and the Mufti list. The only other list to appear on the ballot was Ugljanin's For Bosniak Unity. Ugljanin's list won the election, nineteen seats to sixteen. Zukorlić's group initially raised concerns about electoral fraud but ultimately accepted the results, and Tandir served as a member of the opposition. He did not seek re-election to the council in 2018.

=== Parliamentarian and municipal representative (2016–present) ===
Tandir appeared in the fourth position on the BDZ Sandžak's list in the 2016 parliamentary election; the list won two mandates, and he was not elected. He also received the lead position on a combined BDZ Sandžak–LDP list for the Prijepolje municipal assembly in the concurrent 2016 Serbian local elections and was elected when the list won five mandates.

The BDZ Sandžak was reconstituted as the Justice and Reconciliation Party in 2017. Tandir was promoted to the second position on the party's list in the 2020 parliamentary election and was elected when the list won four mandates. He also led the SPP's list in Prijepolje for the 2020 Serbian local elections and was re-elected to the municipal assembly when the list won eight mandates.

The Serbian Progressive Party (SNS) and its allies won a landslide majority victory in the 2020 parliamentary vote, and the SPP supported the government in the assembly. As five members are required for an official parliamentary group, the SPP formed a group with Milija Miletić of the United Peasant Party (USS), who was also aligned with the Progressives. Tandir served as the group's leader. During the 2020–22 parliament, he was also a member of the committee on spatial planning (Note: Formally known as the Committee on Spatial Planning, Transport, Infrastructure, and Telecommunications.) and the committee on the diaspora and Serbs in the region, as well as being a member of forty-four parliamentary friendship groups. (Note: He was a member of the friendship groups with Albania, Argentina, Armenia, Azerbaijan, Austria, Bahrain, Belarus, Belgium, Bosnia and Herzegovina, Brazil, Canada, China, Croatia, Cyprus, Denmark, Egypt, France, Georgia, Germany, Greece, the Holy See, Hungary, Indonesia, Iran, Iraq, Israel, Italy, Japan, Morocco, the Netherlands, North Macedonia, Palestine, Portugal, Qatar, Russia, Slovenia, South Africa, the Sovereign Order of Malta, Spain, Turkey, Ukraine, the United Arab Emirates, the United Kingdom, and the United States of America.)

Muamer Zukorlić died in November 2021, and the leadership of the SPP passed to his son, Usame Zukorlić. Tandir did not have a good working relationship with the new leadership, and he was not a candidate in the 2022 Serbian parliamentary election. He resigned from the party shortly thereafter, accusing it of carrying out "North Korea-style purges" of dissident voices and moving away from its original purpose. In leaving the SPP, Tandir indicated that he would establish a new political party called the Bosniak-Serb Alliance. The party was officially launched in October 2022 and was registered in January 2023.

Tandir led the BOSS's list for the Prijepolje municipal assembly in the 2023 Serbian local elections and was elected to a third term when the list won two seats. The Serbian Progressive Party (SNS) and its allies won the election, and the BOSS supported the local administration. On 19 February 2024, Tandir was elected as vice-president (i.e., deputy speaker) of the municipal assembly.

In September 2026, Tandir was chosen as a candidate on the electoral list of the SNS-led United Serbia coalition for the upcoming parliamentary election, alongside fellow Bosniak politician Jahja Fehratović.
