= Georgios Zisis =

Greek footballer

Personal information
- Full name: Georgios Zisis
- Date of birth: 23 April 1999 (age 27)
- Place of birth: Kalamata, Greece
- Height: 1.80 m (5 ft 11 in)
- Position: Centre-back

Youth career
- Asteras Tripolis

Senior career*
Years	Team	Apps	(Gls)
2018–2019	Asteras Tripolis	0	(0)
2018–2019	→ Aiginiakos (loan)	20	(0)
2019–2020	Anagennisi Giannitsa		
2020	Episkopi		
2020–2023	Ierapetra	49	(0)
2023–2024	Niki Sitia		

International career^{‡}
2017–2018	Greece U19	8	(0)
2018	Greece U20	2	(0)
- * Club domestic league appearances and goals as of 16 June 2023 ‡ National team caps and goals as of 11 January 2018

Georgios Zisis (Greek: Γεώργιος Ζήσης; born 23 April 1999) is a Greek professional footballer who plays as a centre-back.
