= Servia, Greece =

Town in Western Macedonia, Greece

Servia Σέρβια
- Municipality
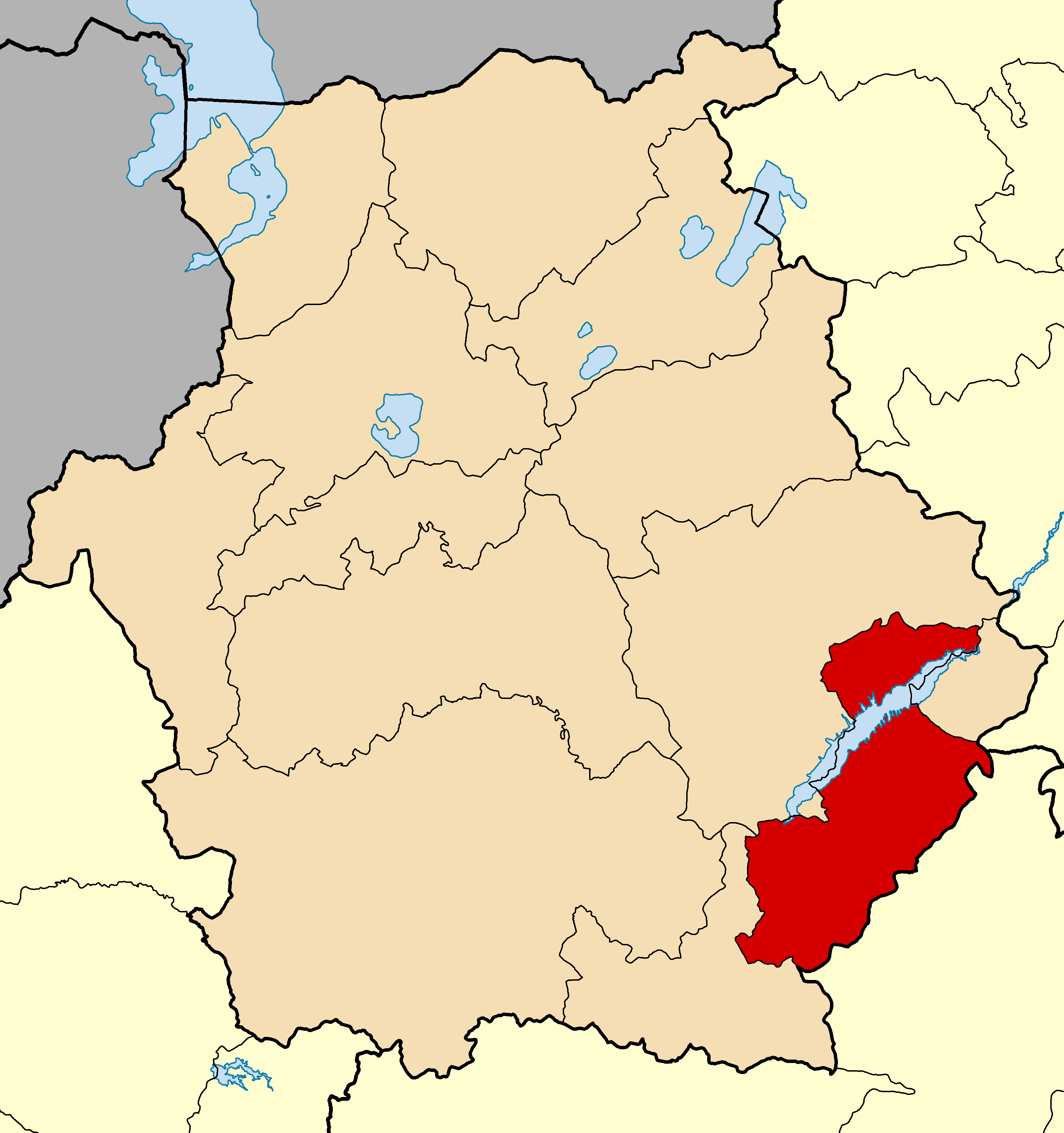
- Location within the regional unit

- Location within Greece
- Coordinates: 40°11′N 22°00′E
- Country: Greece
- Administrative region: West Macedonia
- Regional unit: Kozani

Area
  - Municipality: 601.7 km^{2} (232.3 sq mi)
  - Municipal unit: 400.116 km^{2} (154.486 sq mi)
  - Community: 51.603 km^{2} (19.924 sq mi)
- Elevation: 438 m (1,437 ft)

Population (2021)
  - Municipality: 9,467
  - Density: 15.73/km^{2} (40.75/sq mi)
  - Municipal unit: 7,265
  - Municipal unit density: 18.16/km^{2} (47.03/sq mi)
  - Community: 3,174
  - Community density: 61.51/km^{2} (159.3/sq mi)
- Time zone: UTC+2 (EET)
  - Summer (DST): UTC+3 (EEST)
- Postal code: 505 00
- Area code: 24640
- Vehicle registration: KZ
- Website: servia.gov.gr

Servia (Greek: Σέρβια, romanized: Sérvia) is one of the main towns in the Kozani regional unit, West Macedonia, Greece. It is one of the most historical places in the region, with a 6th-century Byzantine castle and the Kamvounia mountain dominating the landscape. There are also a number of 10th century Byzantine cave hermitages and small churches located nearby, which add to the Byzantine atmosphere of the area.

Since the local government reform of 2019, it is the seat of the extended municipality of Servia. From 2011 to 2019, the town was the seat of the Municipality of Servia-Velventos. The town itself has a population of 3,174 people (2021 census). The municipal unit Servia has an area of 400.116 km^{2}, the community (the town proper) has an area of 51.603 km^{2}.

== Etymology ==
Its name derives from the Latin verb servo, meaning "to watch over" or from the ethnonym "Serb", replacing what is thought to be the ancient name of the town Phylacae (Greek: Φυλακαί, romanized: Phylakaí) from the Greek verb φυλάσσω (phylásso) "to watch over". The ancient name of the town of Servia is also mentioned by Roman writer Pliny the Elder as well as on an Ancient Greek inscription found at the city of Veroia which reads: "Παρμενίων Γλαυκία Φυλακήσιος νικητής εν Δολίχω" (Parmeníon Glafkía Phylakísios nikitís en Dolícho), i.e. "Parmenion son of Glauceas from Phylacae winner at Doliche".

== History ==
=== Prehistoric period ===
Servia has given its name to the prehistoric settlement site beside the former bridge across the Haliakmon river to the west and now submerged deep below the surface of Lake Polyphytos. This was first reported by Alan John Bayard Wace and first excavated by the British School at Athens under the direction of Walter Abel Heurtley in 1930. Renewed excavations were jointly conducted by the Greek Archaeological Service and the British School at Athens under the direction of Aikaterina Rhomiopoulou and Cressida Ridley between 1971 and 1973; in advance before the completion of the Polyphytos hydro-electric dam and the flooding of the valley, to create Polyphytos lake.

The site is a low mound created by the debris of successive phases of human occupation, starting in the Middle Neolithic period before 5000 BCE. The square or rectangular buildings, one or two storeys in height, were framed with massive oak posts and the walls were created with wattle and daub. The 'classic' red on cream ceramic repertoire of this phase is closely related to that of Thessaly at such sites as Sesklo and Achilleion. Typical shapes are fruitstands, shallow bowls and beakers. Bone and stone tools are frequent while ornaments of stone and sea shell (Spondylus gaederopus and Glycimeris) are quite frequent. Occupation continued for a thousand years until the early stages of the Late Neolithic period, characterised by black burnished and grey-on-grey pottery. Occasional fragments of pottery of other styles, together with occasional pieces of obsidian from Melos show that long distance 'trade' links had been established with coastal Thessaly and Eastern Macedonia. After a long interval, occupation resumed in the Early Bronze Age (3rd millennium BC)when the ceramic repertoire suggests a cultural orientation towards Central Macedonia rather than Thessaly.

Palaeobotanical studies of seeds and other plant remains recovered from all periods at the site and studied by R. Housely and R. Hubbard provide important information about early Greek agricultural practices.

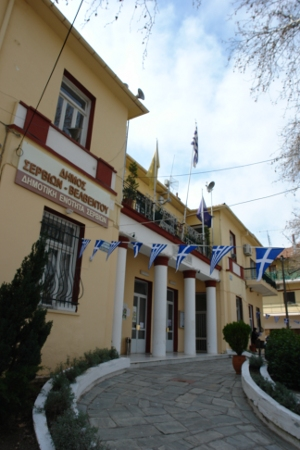
The town hall of the city of Servia.

=== Ancient period ===
During ancient times, Servia served as a fort for the passageway between Macedonia and Thessaly, hence its name. As time passed people settled around the area and the town of Phylacae was created. People that have passed through the then town of Servia, include Alexander the Great, on his way to Thebes in 335 B.C., and Apostle Paul during his journey to Macedonia in the first century A.D.

=== Byzantine period ===
Servia reached its peak as part of the Byzantine Empire when it developed as a strong castle-city (Greek: καστροπολιτεία) guarding the ancient passage from Macedonia to Thessaly. In October 1256, Theodoros II Laskaris, emperor of Nicaea, married his daughter Maria to Nicephorus Angelos, son of the despot of Epirus Michael II Komnenos. As a wedding gift, Theodoros was given the cities of Servia and Dyrrachium. As Servia was a prosperous Byzantine town due to trade, it is mentioned in a large number of medieval texts, by writers such as emperor Constantine VII in the mid 10th century, and by Emperor John VI in the 14th century. Servia is also mentioned in the Chronicle of the Morea.

=== Ottoman period ===
The Ottoman Turks captured Servia in 1393. In 1519 (Hijri 925) the town had 49 Muslim and 646 Christian households; it was a zeamet of Mevlana Ahmet Çelebi. In 1745 the seat of the Bishop of Servia was moved to the nearby city of Kozani being renamed as the Holy Diocese of Servia and Kozani. At the start of the Greek revolution in 1821, the Ottomans ordered Turkish and Albanian irregular military to plunder the region and prevent the formation of links with Greek revolutionaries of the Olympus and Vermio regions. After the collapse of the Greek revolution in Macedonia, revolutionaries of the region moved to the South, where they joined forces with Greeks in the Peloponnese. A prominent revolutionary from the town was Zisis Sotiriou. In 1864, the town became the seat of the Sanjak of Serfiğe in the Manastir Vilayet, and the town was known as Serfiçe (also written as Serfidze) in Ottoman Turkish.

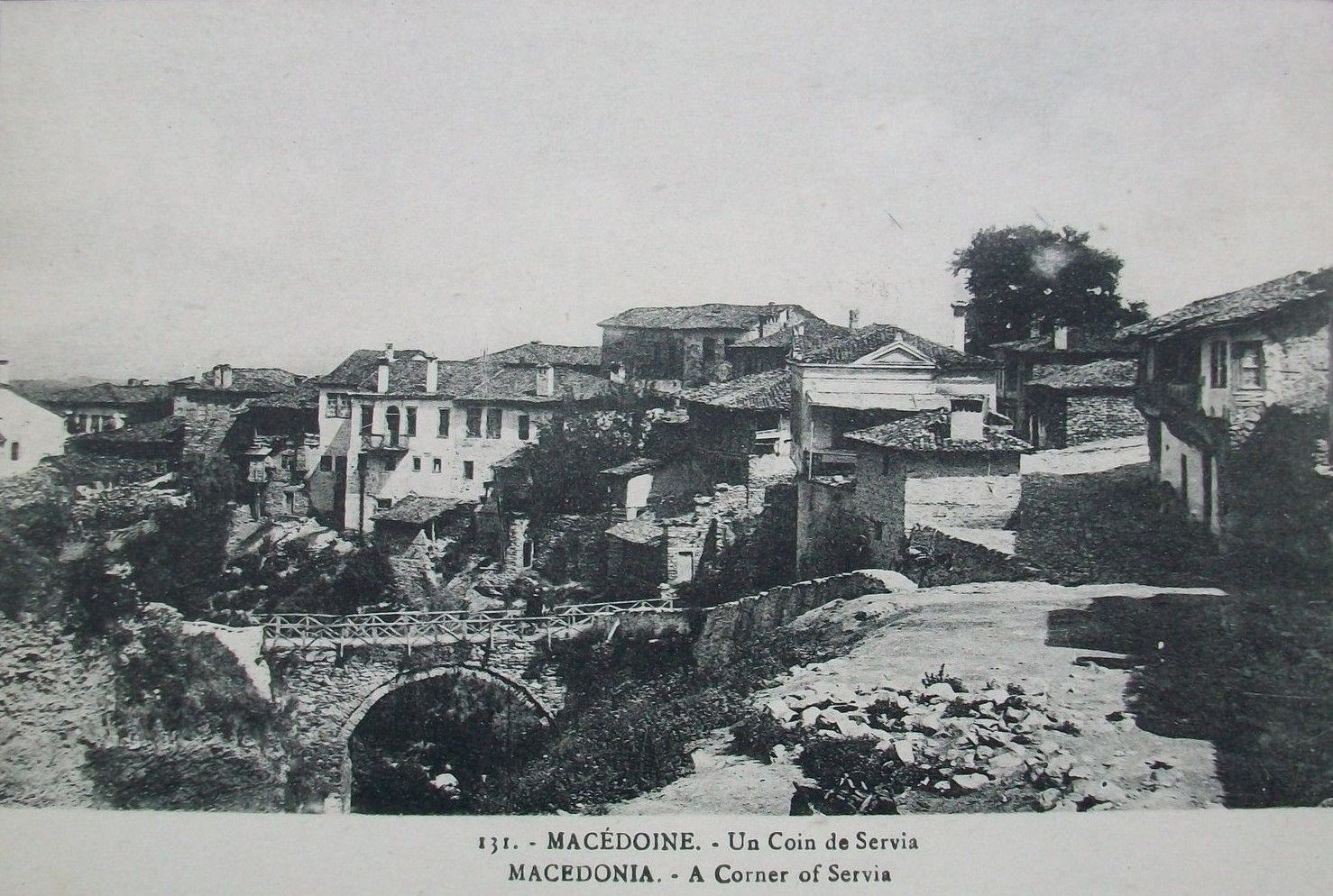
Servia, WWI

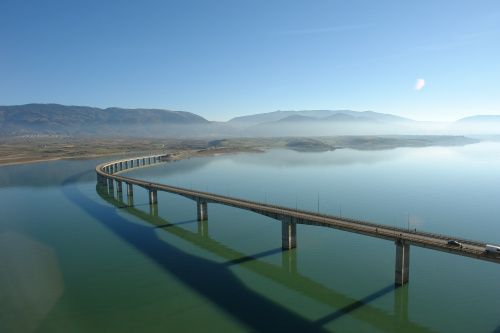
The bridge of lake Polyphytos near Servia; the Pieria mountains can be seen in the background.

=== 20th century ===
The Greek army entered Servia on 10 October 1912, during the First Balkan War, after its victory against the Ottoman army in the Battle of Sarantaporo. On the same day, 117 prominent citizens of Servia were gathered and executed by the Ottomans who were leaving the city, 75 to 90 severed human heads were lined up on either side of one of its streets. From then on the main road of the town leading to the Town Hall is called "117 Εθνομαρτύρων" (117 ethnomartyron), i.e. "Of the 117 National martyrs", in remembrance of this dreadful event. Servia was granted to the Kingdom of Greece by the Treaty of Bucharest in 1913.

The 1920 Greek census recorded 2,907 people in Servia, and in 1923, before the Greek–Turkish population exchange, 820 of its inhabitants (210 families) were Muslim. Following the population exchange, the Muslims were transferred to Turkey and 292 families of Greek refugees had settled in their place by 1926, out of which 130 were from Western Asia Minor, 58 from East Thrace, 80 were Caucasus Pontic Greek and 24 were Pontic Greek from Pontus proper. Out of those from Western Asia Minor, many are known to have been from the Propontis Tsakonian-speaking villages in Mysia. In the 1928 Greek census, the number of refugee families was recorded at 290, making up 1,112 people out of the town's 3,250 inhabitants.

During the Second World War, on 6 March 1943, Italian troops set the town on fire in response to the defeat and capture of an Italian battalion at the Battle of Fardykambos by the Greek Resistance. After this fire the whole town was left in ruins and most of Greek neoclassical architecture was lost apart from 3 houses which remain until today. One of them was turned into the Folk Museum of Servia.

=== Recent history ===
Today Servia stands as one of the main towns and agricultural centres of the surrounding region, with the extended Servia municipality having a population of 9,467 people (2021 census). Main road access into Servia is provided by Greek National Road 3, which passes through the town and is part of the European route E65, connecting the cities of Florina and Kozani with Larissa.

A recent historical event that occurred in Servia, was a holy liturgy, celebrated by Metropolitan Paulos of Servia and Kozani at the 7th century Metropolitan Church of St. Demetrius (now in ruins). The event which took place during the summer of 2008 was the first liturgy at the site after 600 years. On Thursday 28 June 2012, the Ecumenical Patriarch Bartholomew visited Servia taking part in Great Vespers at the Church of Agia Kyriake and afterwards visited the old Basilica of Agios Demetrios and the Byzantine castle-city of Servia. The patron Saint of the town is Agia Kyriake.

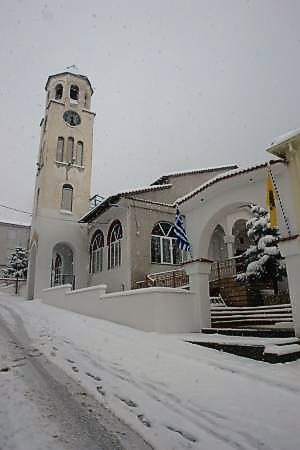
The church of Saint Kyriake, patron saint of the town of Servia.

== Administration ==
The municipality of Servia consists of three municipal units:

- Kamvounia
- Livadero
- Servia

The municipal unit of Servia is subdivided into the following communities:

- Avles
- Goules
- Imera
- Kastania
- Kranidia
- Lefkara
- Mesiani
- Metaxas
- Neraida
- Platanorrevma
- Polyrracho
- Roditis
- Servia
- Trigoniko
- Vathylakkos

== Sights of interest ==
- The Byzantine castle built in the 6th century by Justinian. Unfortunately, only one of its four towers remain in full, as it was bombed by the Germans during World War II.
- The high bridge of lake Polyphytos
- The Servia gorge.
- The Geological Park of Mikrovalto
- The Folk Museum of Servia
- Various Byzantine cave-churches, such as Agios Antonios Kremastos, Agios Theodoros (11th century), and Agio Pneuma

== Notable people ==
- St. Theodora (1210–1280), Queen of Epirus
- St. Jacob (1347–1355), Metropolitan of Servia
- St. Germanos (1690), Metropolitan of Servia
- Georgios Kontaris (1630–1698), scholar
- Dimitrios Panagiannousis (1750–1828), Metropolitan of Belgrade and Budapest
- Eugenios Pateras (1808–1890), Bishop of Servia and Kozani
- Zisis Sotiriou (19th century), revolutionary of the Greek War of Independence
- Georgios Zorbas, (1867–1941), the main hero of the novel by Nikos Kazantzakis, Zorba the Greek
- John Zizioulas (born 1931), theologian and chairman of the Academy of Athens
- Apostolos Gkountoulas (born 1985), Olympic rower
- Nikolaos Gkountoulas (born 1985), Olympic rower

== Culture and sports ==
The "Morphotikos Omilos Servion", which is the main cultural society of the town, is organising its main cultural festival every August. It also runs the philharmonic band of the town, established in 1928, as well as running various educational talks and seminars, and supporting teaching classes for children and adults in painting, folk dance, choir, and chess.

In terms of sports, hang gliding is prominent in the area as national championships are held at the cliffs near Kastania. The Servia cycling competition is held annually, with cyclists from all over the country completing a round of lake Polyfytos; the cycling tour is about 60 km long at 1000 m altitude. The Kastra Mountain Trail is held every April at the Byzantine hill, attracting runners from all over the country. Rowing and other water sports at the lake are also prominent via the Nautical Club of Kozani. The town's football team is "Titan" (Τιτάν), founded in 1927, and the basketball team is "Anagennisi" (Αναγέννηση).

The annual trade festival of Servia, locally known as emporopanígyri (εμποροπανήγυρη), peaks at the last weekend of September, attracting people from the wider region of Western Macedonia. It was most probably established during Byzantine times, with the earliest written account being in 1556.

== See also ==
- The Archeological Museum of Aeani
- Lake Polyfytos Bridge
- Noktaria Geological Park
- Velventos
- Aeani

== Gallery ==
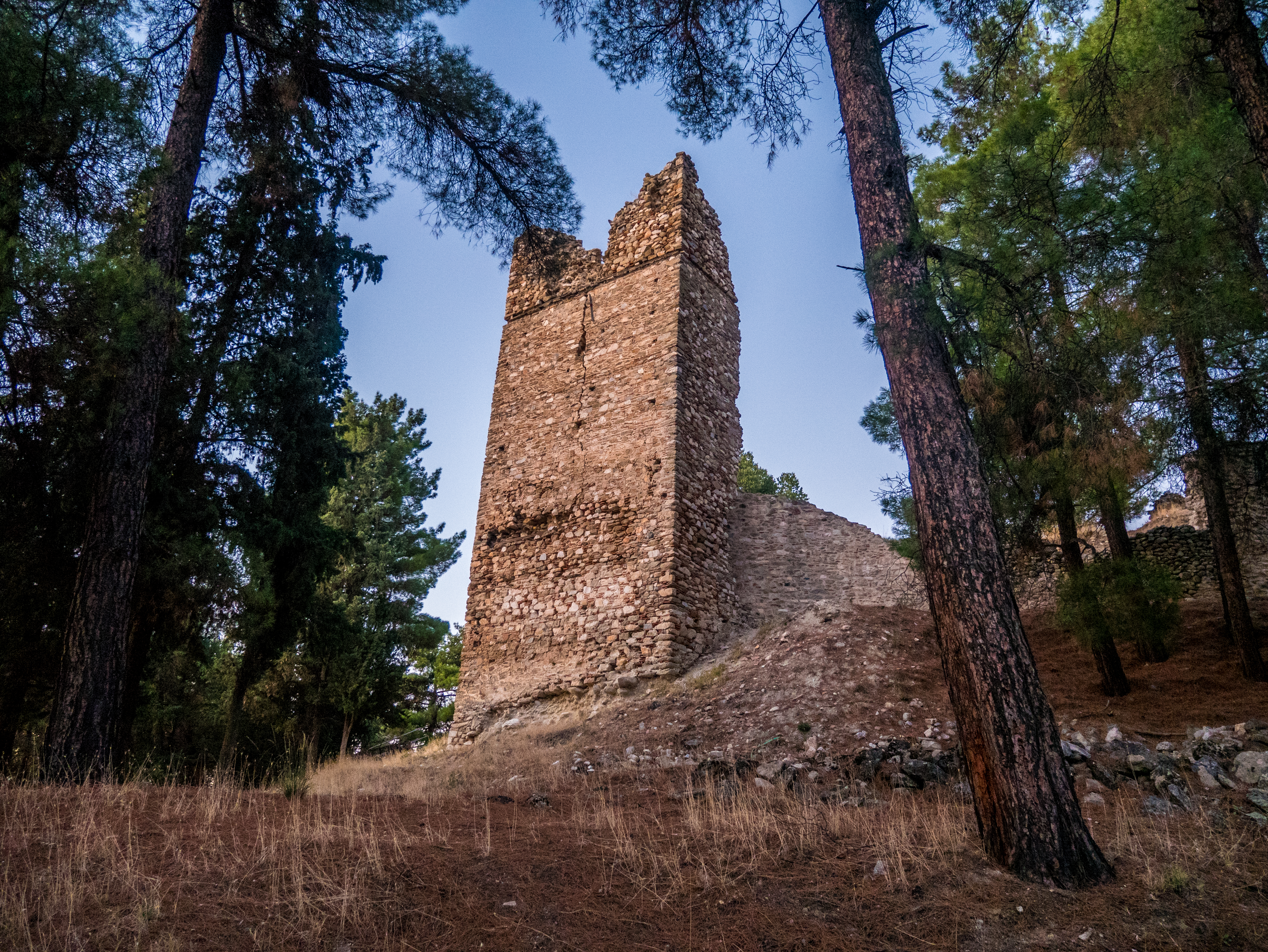
Remains of the Byzantine castle

Mt. Kamvounia at the south side of Servia

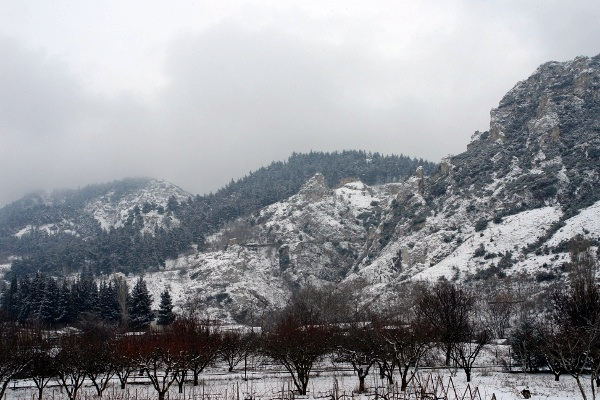
Mt. Kamvounia

Noktaria geological formations at the village of Mikrovalto.

The Church of St Georgios at the center of Servia during winter.

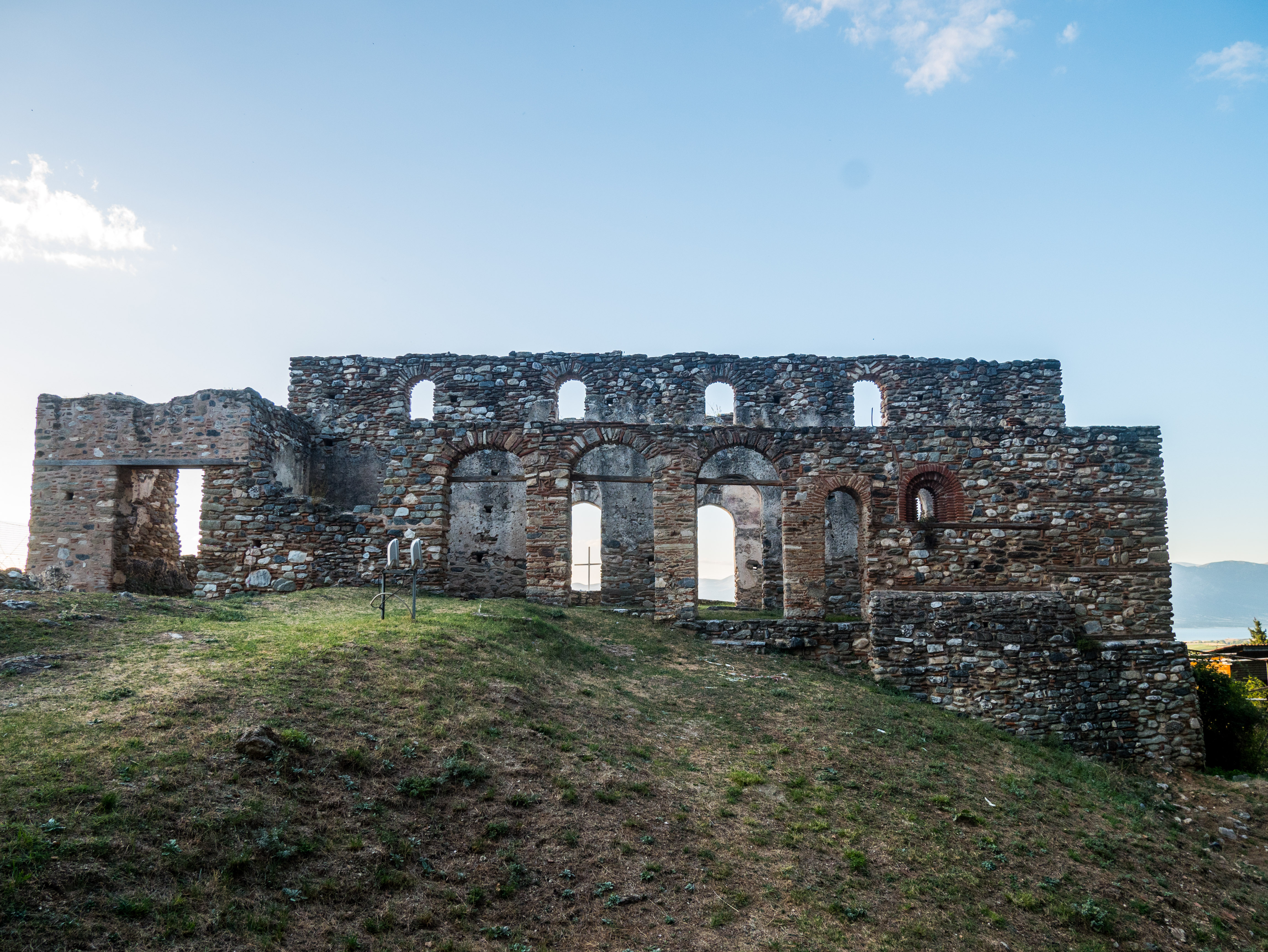
Remains of the Byzantine Basilica of Katechoumenon.

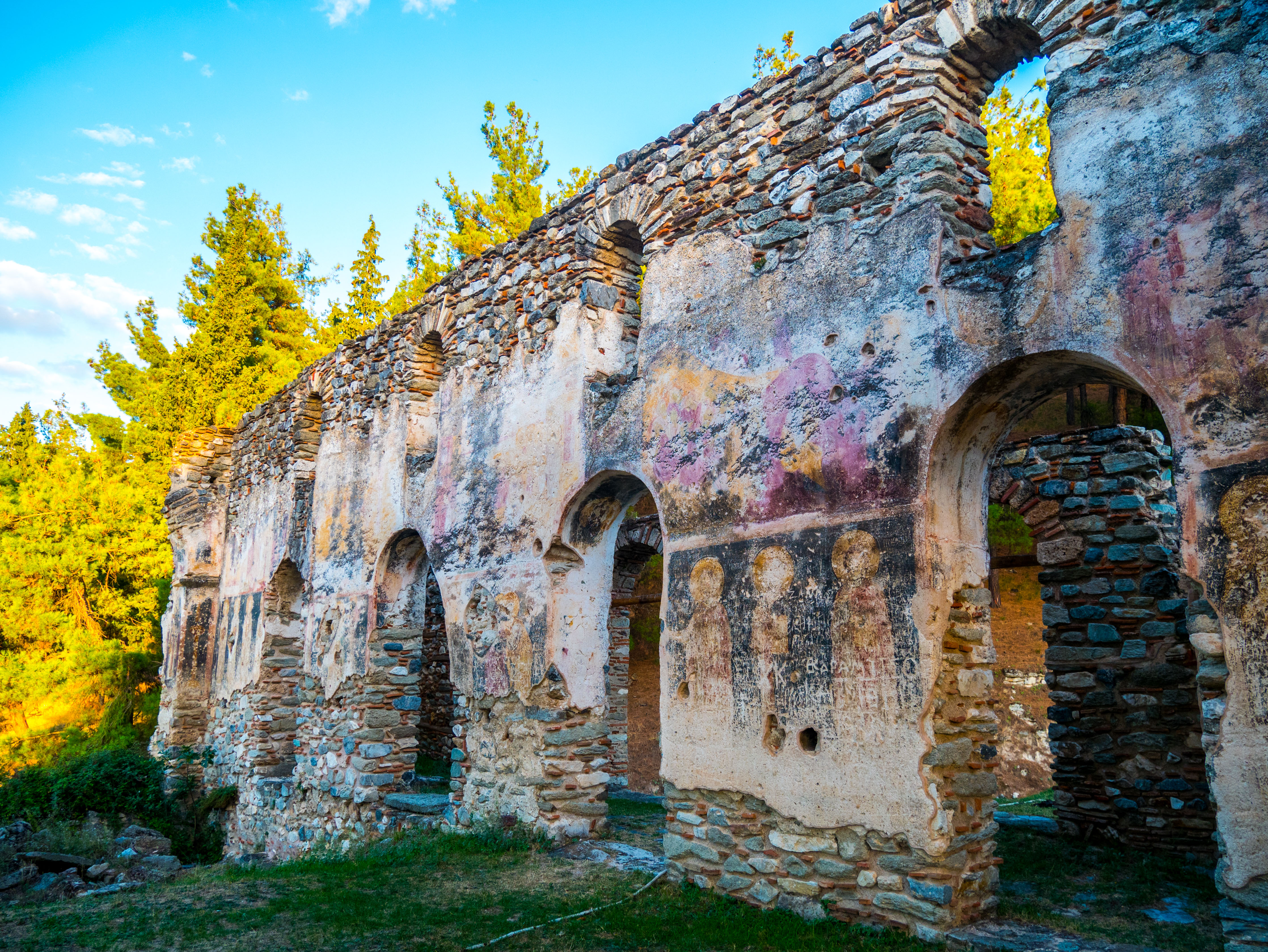
Remains of the Byzantine Basilica of Katechoumenon (interior view).

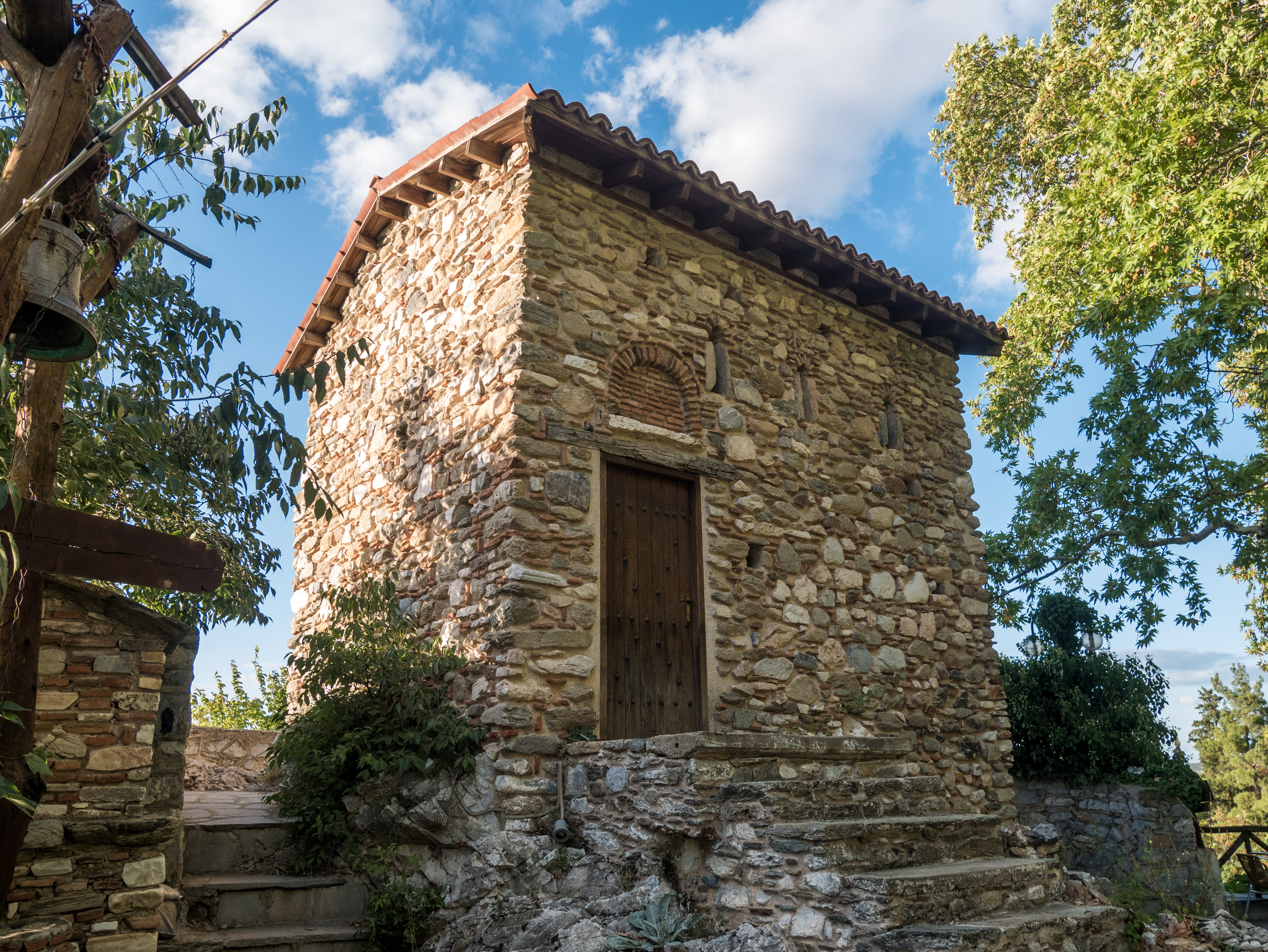
Byzantine church of the Holy Unmerceneries.
