= Livadero =

Livadero Λιβαδερό
- Municipal unit
- Location within the regional unit

- Location within Greece
- Coordinates: 40°02′N 21°57′E
- Country: Greece
- Administrative region: West Macedonia
- Regional unit: Kozani
- Municipality: Servia

Area
  - Municipal unit: 52.0 km^{2} (20.1 sq mi)
- Elevation: 980 m (3,220 ft)

Population (2021)
  - Municipal unit: 912
  - Municipal unit density: 17.5/km^{2} (45.4/sq mi)
- Time zone: UTC+2 (EET)
  - Summer (DST): UTC+3 (EEST)
- Postal code: 50500
- Vehicle registration: KZ

Livadero (Greek: Λιβαδερό) is a village and a former community in Kozani regional unit, West Macedonia, Greece. Since the 2019 local government reform it is part of the municipality Servia, of which it is a municipal unit. The municipal unit has an area of 51.999 km^{2}. The population in 2021 was 912.
