= Panajot Papakostopulos =

Panajot Papakostopoulos (Velventos, Ottoman Empire, 1820 – Belgrade, Serbia, 29 May 1879) was a prominent medical doctor, professor at the First Belgrade Gymnasium and one of the founders Serbian Medical Society.

== Early life ==
Panajot Papakostopoulos was born in 1820 in the small town of Velventos in Macedonia. He finished primary school in his native Velventos, and high school and philosophy in Kozani. In 1835, he moved to Novi Sad, where he taught Greek to Serbian merchants, and for a time he was also a Greek teacher at an elementary school there. While associating with Serbs, he learned to speak Serbian fluently, and in the Vojvodina environment, he also learned German. After five years, he went to Vienna, where he enrolled at the School of Medicine. In order to raise money for schooling and living expenses, he gave Greek language classes and sang in the Greek church.

== Arrival and work in Belgrade ==
In 1853, as a physician, he came to live and work in Belgrade, where he opened his medical practice. In August of the same year, he was appointed professor of the Greek language in the First Belgrade Gymnasium by decree. At the end of the school year in 1854, he left Belgrade and went to Serez (Greece), where he worked as a medical doctor for the next three years. In October 1857, Dr. Papakostopulos returned to Belgrade again, with his wife Eftalija, where he continued to work as a physician and professor in the Belgrade Gymnasium. Papakostopoulos tried to develop in his students a love for classical literature and Greek. He would often talk for hours about the kinship between the Old Greek and Old Slavonic, about a similar historical fate which the Greek and the Serb have. He was a very popular professor, both among colleagues and students. He worked as a professor until 1874, when on 3 October he was appointed district physician in Belgrade. He was very passionate about his profession. At a farewell party he spoke to his colleagues and students:

From 1842 to 1874 I was a continuous teacher, and in Vienna itself, I taught other people's children and taught medicine. Returning to Belgrade on 12 August 1853, I became a professor of the Greek language at the Belgrade high school, where I successfully served for 18 years. So I was constantly in my life either a teacher or a student.

Papakostopulos worked as a physician until his death in Belgrade on 29 May 1879.

== Serbian Medical Society ==
At the juncture, in that period of time, great discoveries in the field of medicine were being made by physicians both at home and abroad. The need to find ways to regularly follow the daily innovations in medicine in particular and in health in general presented itself. One way was to establish a medical society, where all physicians could exchange experiences, prepare or listen to lectures.

The Serbian Medical Society was founded on April 22, 1872 on the initiative of Vladan Đorđević and his colleagues. At the first meeting of the founding assembly, 15 people were present, including Papakostopulos.

== Family ==
Papakostopoulos was married to Ephthalia, who bore him five children: Pericles; Euphrosyne; Plato; Aspasia; and Cleanta. They lived at home, in Belgrade on Kosmajska street 38.
