= Demetrius Kantakouzenos =

Serbian writer (born 1435)

- Born: 1435; Novo Brdo, Serbian Despotate (now Kosovo)
- Died: after 1487; Black Sea region
- Occupation: writer
- Relatives: Janja Kantakouzenos
- Writing career
- Language: Serbian

Demetrius Kantakouzenos (Serbian: Димитрије Кантакузин/Dimitrije Kantakuzin; born 1435—fl. 1487) was a Serbian writer of Greek origin who lived in the 15th century Serbian Despotate. He attained literary prominence at the same time as Vladislav Gramatik and others of his generation.

== Life ==
=== Origin and early life ===
Dimitrije's father, whose name is unknown, was a customs officer (kesar) at Novo Brdo during the 1440s. His father was most likely one of the Kantakouzenoi that settled Serbia after the marriage of Serbian Despot Đurađ Branković (r. 1427–1456) and Irene Kantakouzene in 1414. Dimitrije's younger brothers were Janja, Alexios and George. Novo Brdo was an important medieval Serbian cultural and economic center. It was famous for its rich silver mines, which attracted both domestic and foreign miners. In addition, many talented Serbian and Bulgarian writers and artists resided in that city, among the most notable being Konstantin Mihailović (1430–fl. 1501) and Vladislav the Grammarian (fl. 1456–79).

Dimitrije was born in 1435 in Novo Brdo, during the reign of Đurađ Branković. In 1438, the last free Serbian territory fell into the hands of the Ottoman Turks, led by Sultan Murad II. Even after the capture of Smederevo, however, the last capital of independent Serbia, Novo Brdo resisted Turkish invasion and refused to capitulate. In 1441, after more than two years of siege, Novo Brdo was captured. The citizens of Novo Brdo still refused to admit to defeat and immediately organized an uprising, which was cruelly and mercilessly quelled by the Ottomans. Novo Brdo, captured and occupied, remained undefeated and continued its resistance until 1455. That year, after a prolonged and heavy bombardment of the city, Novo Brdo finally capitulated. Sultan Mehmed the Conqueror himself entered the city and ordered the execution of the nobility of Novo Brdo. He also ordered all able-bodied Serbian men to be decapitated, the children and boys to be enlisted in the Janissaries, and the girls and women of that city to be given to his soldiers and commanders as slaves. Dimitrije, a youth of about twenty at the time, witnessed these scenes of anarchy, atrocity, and death. This experience left an indelible impression on him, and he became obsessed with the transitiveness of life and the power of death. Death became an ever-present thought and vision, a constant companion, a tormentor, the central theme and recurrent motif of his literary works.

=== Service to the Branković dynasty ===
Dimitrije had another traumatic experience, according to some chronicles, Sultan Mehmed the Conqueror executed several members of the Kantakouzenos family in Serbia; Janja was executed in Istanbul in September 1477 together with his two younger brothers, Alexios and George, his four sons and twelve grandsons, on the orders of Sultan Mehmed II. The fact that the Serbian Kantakouzenos (Kantakuzini) were closely related to Irene Kantakouzene (Jerina), the wife of Serbian Despot Đurađ Branković, who gave his daughter Mara Branković in marriage to Murad II, did not prevent their execution. Dimitrije somehow survived this massacre and left Novo Brdo. For a short while, he lived with Mara Branković, the daughter of Đurađ and Jerina Branković (Irene Kantakouzene), the widow of Murad II, and the stepmother of Mehmed the Conqueror, the same Sultan who ordered the executions. After the death of Mara Branković in 1487, Dimitrije left Serbia and stayed near the Black Sea with some still surviving relatives. There he died, but the exact year of his death is not known.

== Works ==
With Mara Branković's influence, Ivan of Rila's relics were moved from Trnovo to the newly rebuilt Rila monastery. While residing in the Rila monastery in 1469, Kantakuzin wrote a biography of Saint John of Rila and a touching "Prayer to the Holy Virgin" imploring her aid in combating sin. The biography attempts to explain the reasons for the Christians' defeat at the hands of the Turks. The preserved acrostic in his "Service to St. John of Rila" indicates that it was written originally in the Old Serbian idiom. His moving supplications is among the most impressive prayers in Old Serbian literature.

In addition to several epistolary works, Kantakuzin wrote "Hymns to St. Demetrios" and "Destruction of Dacia."

Kantakuzin, a poet of death, is regarded as an original talent among Serbian medieval poets.
