= Velventos =

Velventos Βελβεντός
- Municipality
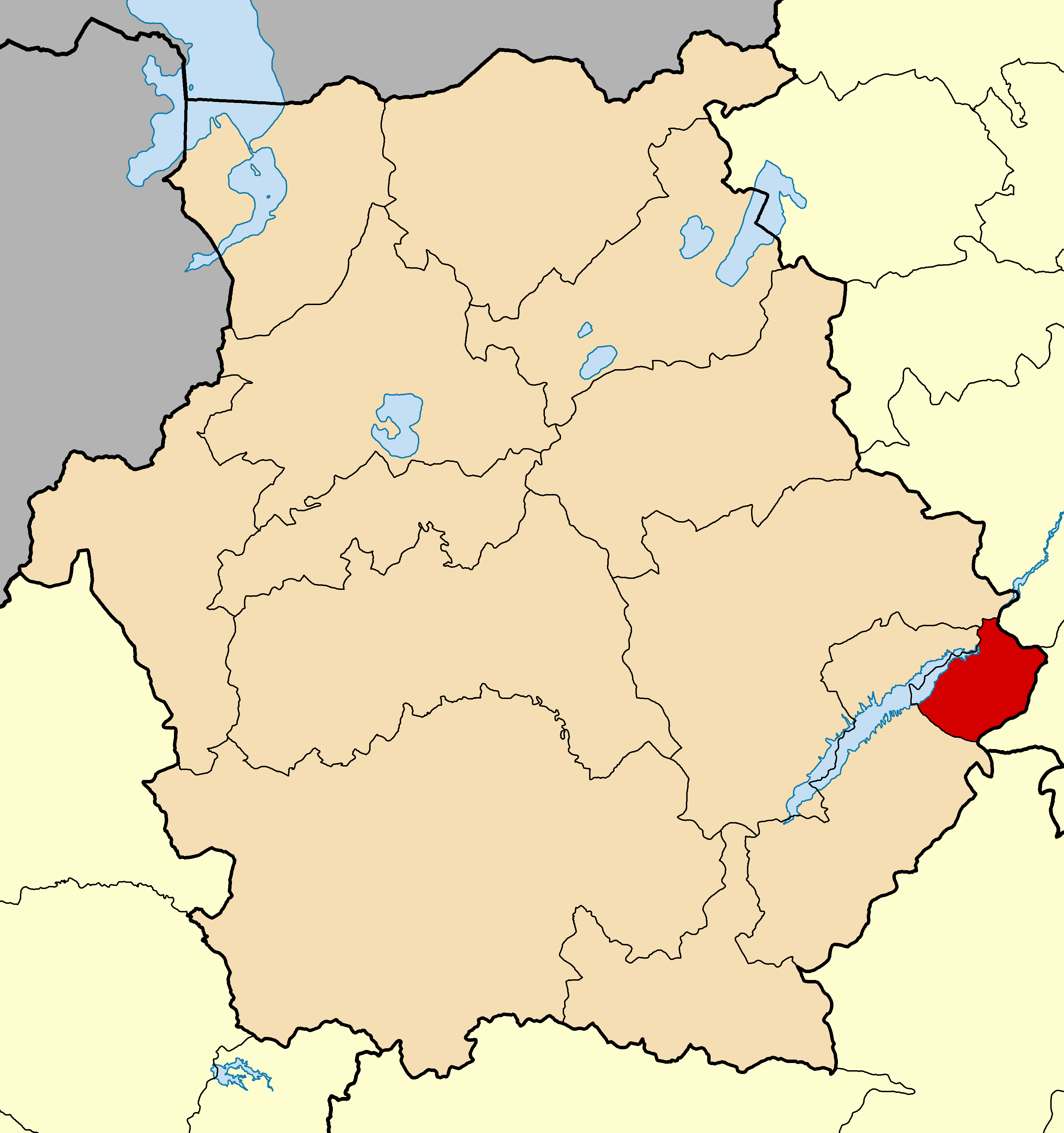
- Location within the regional unit

- Location within Greece
- Coordinates: 40°15′N 22°04′E
- Country: Greece
- Administrative region: Western Macedonia
- Regional unit: Kozani

Government
  - Mayor: Emmanouil Stergiou (since 2019)

Area
  - Municipality: 126.516 km^{2} (48.848 sq mi)
  - Community: 54.573 km^{2} (21.071 sq mi)
- Elevation: 428 m (1,404 ft)

Population (2021)
  - Municipality: 3,448
  - Density: 27.25/km^{2} (70.59/sq mi)
  - Community: 3,399
  - Community density: 62.28/km^{2} (161.3/sq mi)
- Time zone: UTC+2 (EET)
  - Summer (DST): UTC+3 (EEST)
- Postal code: 504 00
- Area code: +30-2463
- Vehicle registration: KZ
- Website: wwww.velventos.gr

Velventos (Greek: Βελβεντός) or Velvento (Βελβεντό) is a town and municipality in Kozani regional unit, Western Macedonia, Greece. The 2021 census recorded 2,949 people in the community of Velventos and 3,057 in the municipality. The municipality has an area of 126.516 km^{2}, the community 54.573 km^{2}.

== Administration ==
The municipality of Velventos is subdivided into the following communities (constituent villages in brackets):

- Velventos (Velventos, Paliogratsano)
- Agia Kyriaki
- Katafygio
- Polyfyto

The community of Velventos (before 1940: Velvendos; Βελβενδός) was created in 1918. It absorbed the former community Paliogratsano in 1951. The municipality of Velventos was formed in 1985 by the merger of the communities of Velventos and Agia Kyriaki. The community of Polyfyto was absorbed in 1994, and Katafygio in 1997. At the 2011 Kallikratis reform, it became part of the new municipality Servia-Velventos. In 2019 the municipality of Velventos was recreated in its pre-2011 extension.

== Population ==
Year	Settlement	Community	Municipality
1981	3,739	-	-
1991	3,577	-	3,940
2001	3,437	3,504	3,754
2011	3,360	3,399	3,448
2021	2,913	2,949	3,057

== Geography ==
Velventos lies at the foot of the Pierian Mountains, 33 km northeast of the city of Kozani. It is located near the artificial lake of Polyfyto. It is located southwest of Veria, north-northwest of Servia and Larissa, east-northeast of Grevena and south-southeast of Kozani. Kozani Provincial Road 6 connects the town with Greek National Road 3 (EO3).

Surrounded by forests, it is located in the fertile valley of the Haliacmon river and produces fruit, mainly peaches. 10.6% of the area is cultivated. Agricultural production is organised in two agricultural cooperatives.

== History ==
The area has been continually occupied since the prehistoric times. For this reason, many fruitful archaeological digs have been made in the area, unearthing mainly prehistoric findings. Velventos contains also many late Byzantine and post-Byzantine monuments and temples, among them the 12th-century church of Saint Minas and the 14th-century church of Saint Paraskevi.

During the Turkish occupation of Greece, Velventos saw great cultural development. Architect Stamatios Kleanthis was born here.

Velventos became part of Greece during the Balkan Wars.

== Facilities ==
Velventos has a school, church, a lyceum (middle school), a gymnasium (secondary school), banks, a post office, and a square.

A well organized athletic stadium for several indoor and outdoor sport activities is located at the exit of the town. There are 2 Athletic Clubs, A.C. Velventos who has Soccer, Basketball and Volleyball as their main sport activities and A.C. Taekwondo Velventos with Taekwondo and Kick Boxing.

== Notable people ==
Numerous scholars and famous researchers were born in this area:

- John Zizioulas, Greek Orthodox prelate
- Stamatios Kleanthis, architect
- Markos Palamidis, fighter during the Macedonian struggle
- Panajot Papakostopulos, medical doctor and professor

== Dialect ==
Velventos has its own dialect, one of the features is Standard Modern Greek /jo/ being realized as /y/.

== See also ==
- List of settlements in the Kozani regional unit
