= Zisis Sotiriou =

Greek revolutionary

- Ζήσης Σωτηρίου
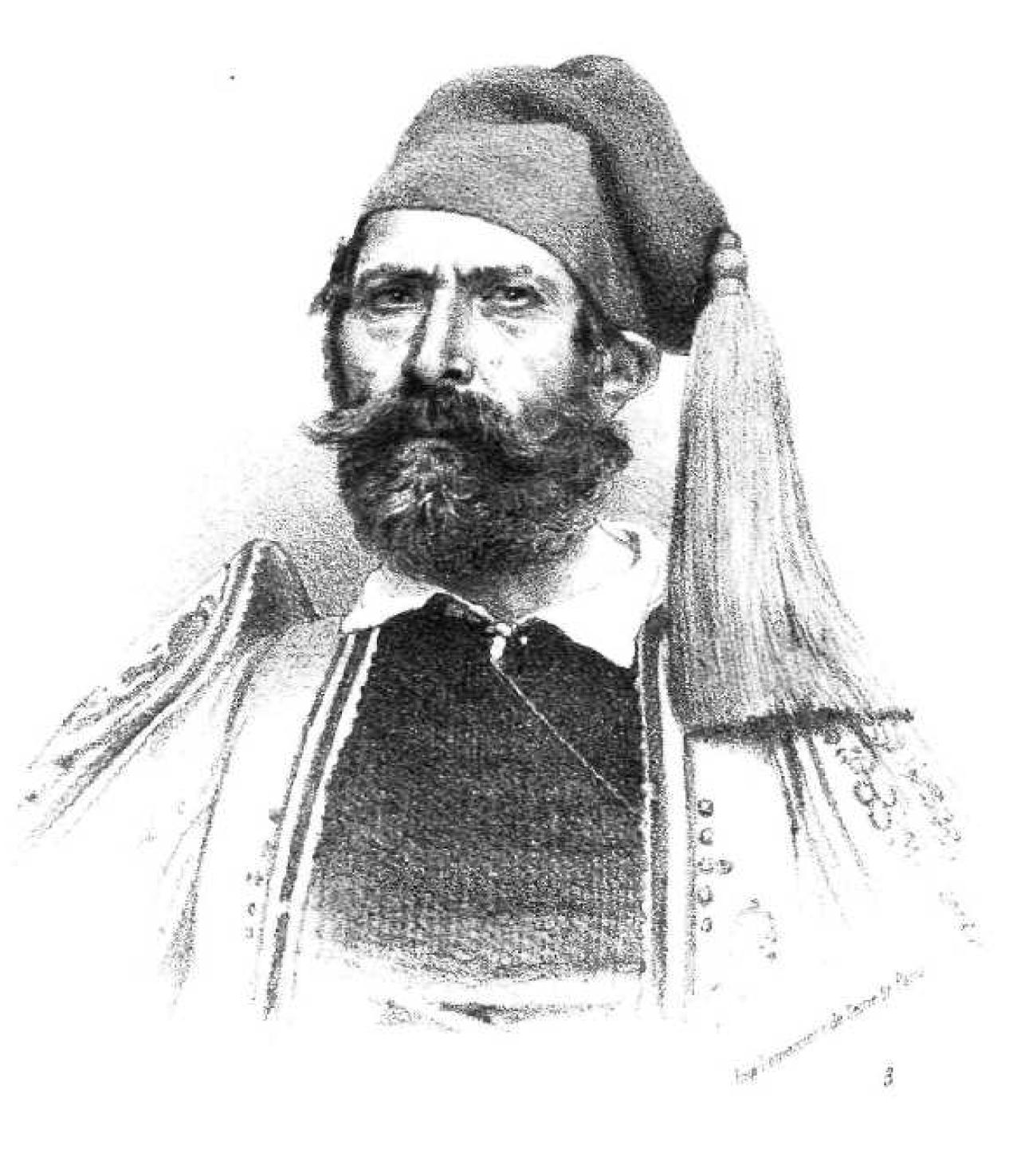
- Zisis Sotiriou c. 1864
- Born: c. early 1800s Servia, Pashalik of Yanina, Ottoman Empire (now Greece)
- Military career
- Allegiance: First Hellenic Republic; Kingdom of Greece; Kingdom of Sardinia
- Branch: Hellenic Army; Royal Sardinian Army
- Conflicts: Greek War of Independence; Wars of Italian Unification; Second Italian War of Independence

Zisis Sotiriou (Greek: Ζήσης Σωτηρίου) was a Greek revolutionary of the Greek War of Independence.

== Biography ==
He was born in Servia of Kozani in the 1800s, but his family soon moved to Budapest. He was the son of klepht captain Sotiris. He was one of the first Diaspora Greeks who returned to fight for the Greek War of Independence. He fought together with Emmanouel Pappas and his army in many operations in Macedonia, as well as in the Peloponnese and in Central Greece.

From 1830, he took part in most revolutionary movements in the Greek state and abroad. He took place in the Second Italian War of Independence on the side of Giuseppe Garibaldi as a volunteer along with Ilias Stekoulis, Spyridon Sasellas, Alexandros Dosios, Nikolaos Makris, Nikolaos Smolenskis and others. He was the author of dozens of revolutionary proclamations, as well as the First Proclamation of Volunteer army of Garibaldi, released on 8 June 1859.

Later, he returned to Greece, and worked as a guard at the Acropolis Museum. An article in the newspaper Eleftherotypia refers to his great selflessness and love for his homeland: He was a man of labor, a patriot, selfless, full of zeal, who when was offered for a medal and salary increase for the services he offered, he denied both, stating that "I have never asked for any remuneration or increase of my salary, if I do not fulfill my duty faithfully and honestly, doing so according to my principles and the oath which I gave to my homeland..."
