= Janja Kantakouzenos =

Serbian nobleman and mining businessman

- Lord of Novo Brdo
- Born: after 1435; Novo Brdo, Serbian Despotate (now Kosovo)
- Died: September 1477; Istanbul, Ottoman Empire (now Turkey)
- Buried: 16 September 1477; Galata
- Noble family: Kantakouzenoi
- Spouse: Euphrosyne
- Issue: four or eight sons
- Occupation: Ottoman tax-farmer

Janja Kantakouzenos (Serbian: Јања Кантакузиновић; after 1435 – September 1477) was a nobleman from the mine town of Novo Brdo (then Serbian Despotate) who had economic deals in the mining industry with the Ottoman Empire after their conquest of Serbia. He was a descendant of the Kantakouzenoi that settled in Serbia after the marriage between Despot Đurađ Branković and Irene Kantakouzene.

== Life ==
Janja's father, whose name is unknown, was a customs officer (gabelotto) at Novo Brdo during the 1440s. His father was most likely one of the Kantakouzenoi that settled Serbia after the marriage of Serbian Despot Đurađ Branković (r. 1427–1456) and Irene Kantakouzene in 1414. Janja's eldest brother was Demetrius (b. 1435), and his younger brothers were Alexios and George.

In Ragusan documents dated to 1461 and 1462, Janja is mentioned as "Jagno Catacusini de Novo Brdo". The presence of Demetrius and Janja in Novo Brdo after 1467 shows that the Kantakouzenoi were not affected by Mehmed II's massive deportation and forced settlement of the inhabitants to Istanbul, which happened that year. He had economic deals with the Ottoman Empire; in 1468 he, Yorgi Ivrana, Tomanin Kantakouzenos of Serres, and a Palaiologos of Istanbul are mentioned as tax-farmers of mines in the region of Serbia (Laz and Vilk); in 1474 he, his brother George, Nikola Danjovil and Lika received the tax-farm of the gold and silver mines of upper Serbia, for the sum of 14 million akçe. He later rented the silver mines of Novo Brdo.

Janja was executed in Istanbul in September 1477 together with his two younger brothers, his four sons and twelve grandsons, on the orders of Sultan Mehmed II. A Palaiologos buried their remains in Galata on 16 September the same year. The reason for his family's execution is not known.

== Kinship ==
Matei Cazacu made the assumption that Janja was a relative to Mahmud Pasha's mother. According to Stavrides it is not impossible that Janja's business with the Ottomans were due to his relations to a high-standing official, such as Mahmud Pasha. Babinger mentioned that Janja was a close relative of Catherine of Cilli, the daughter of Đurađ Branković and Irene Kantakouzene. Irene's brother George was allegedly a cousin of Mahmud Pasha's mother.

== See also ==
- Dimitrije Kantakuzin

== Annotations ==
1. Name: His name in Serbian historiography is Janja Kantakuzin (Јања Кантакузин) and Janja Kantakuzinović (Јања Кантакузиновић). His given name has also been rendered as Jovan. Contemporary Latin sources call him "Jagno Catacusini".

== Sources ==
- Stavrides, Théoharis (2001), The Sultan of vezirs: the life and times of the Ottoman Grand Vezir Mahmud Pasha Angelovic (1453–1474), Brill, ISBN 9789004121065, "John Kantakouzenos of Novo Brdo"
- Miloš Blagojević; Dejan Medaković; Radoš Ljušić; Čedomir Popov (2000), Istorija srpske državnosti, Book 2, Srpska akademija nauka i umetnosti, "(Јања) Кантакузин"
- Nicol, Donald (1968). The Byzantine family of Kantakouzenos (Cantacuzenus) ca. 1100-1460: A Genealogical and Prosopographical Study. Dumbarton Oaks studies 11. Washington, DC: Dumbarton Oaks Center for Byzantine Studies. OCLC 390843.
