= Konstantinos Dogras =

Greek chieftain

Kapetan (Chieftain) Konstantinos Dogris
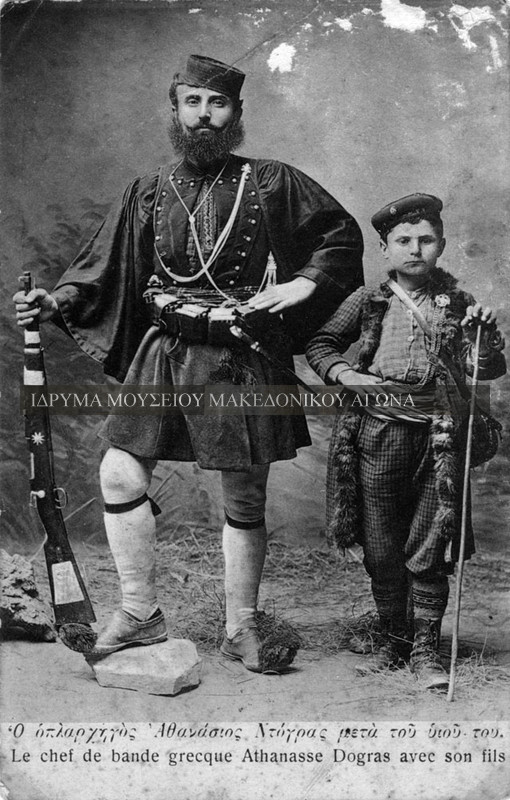
- Konstantinos Dogras and his son.
- Native name: Κωνσταντίνος Ντόγρης
- Born: c. 1870s Vogatsiko, Manastir vilayet, Ottoman Empire (now Greece)
- Allegiance: Kingdom of Greece
- Service / branch: Macedonian Committee
- Battles / wars: Macedonian Struggle

Konstantinos Dogris (Kapetan Dogras) (Greek: Κωνσταντίνος Ντόγρης (Καπετάν Ντόγρας)) was a Greek chieftain of the Macedonian Struggle from Vogatsiko, Kastoria.

== Biography ==
Konstantinos Dogris (Kapetan Dogras) was born in the end of the 19th century in Vogatsiko. He studied in the primary school of Vogatsiko, where Athanasios Iatrou from Polygyros taught. He formed an armed group to counter Bulgarian attacks and operated in the areas of Popoli and Verno. He was one of the closest partners of Pavlos Melas. He also collaborated with Zacharias Papadas (Kapetan Foufas) and Grigorio Falirea (Kapetan Zakas).

== Sources ==
- Athanasios Iatrou, The action of the chieftain Kostas Dogras from Vogatsiko, Macedonian Struggle, v. 14 (1930), pp. 14-15
- Ioannis S. Koliopoulos (scientific editing), Obscure, native Macedonian fighters, Society for Macedonian Studies, University Studio Press, Thessaloniki, 2008, p. 74
