= Ioannis Boubaras =

Greek chieftain

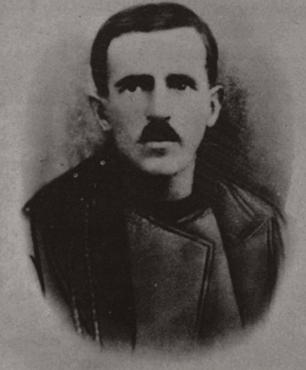
- A photograph of Ioannis Boubaras
- Native name: Ιωάννης Μπουμπάρας
- Born: c. late 1800s Vlasti, Monastir Vilayet, Ottoman Empire, (now Greece)
- Died: c. 1905; Ptolemaida, Monastir Vilayet, Ottoman Empire (now Greece)
- Allegiance: Kingdom of Greece
- Service / branch: HMC
- Battles / wars: Macedonian Struggle; Battle of Mouriki

Ioannis Boubaras (Greek: Ιωάννης Μπουμπάρας) was a Greek chieftain of the Macedonian Struggle from Vlasti, West Macedonia, then in the Ottoman Empire.

== Biography ==
Ioannis Boubaras was born in the end of the 19th century in Vlasti. He participated from the beginning of the Macedonian Struggle, as a rifleman, messenger, guide and liaison of the chieftains of Western Macedonia. He was a member of the National Committee of Blatsi with significant activity. He created his own armed band and cooperated with the officers Georgios Katechakis, Petros Manos and Pavlos Gyparis in various missions in Eordaia, Kastoria and Florina. On 21 April 1905 he participated as a guide of various bands in the Battle of Mouriki and was arrested by the Ottoman Army on the hill Sni. He was transported to Ptolemaida, where he was tortured and mutilated to death.

His bust is today in a park in Ptolemaida.
