= Battle of Ptolemaida =

- Part of the Battle of Greece
Date	13 April 1941
Location	Ptolemaida area, Greece 40.516667°N 21.683333°E
Result	German victory

Belligerents
United Kingdom; Australia; New Zealand	Germany

Commanders and leaders
(United Kingdom) Brig. H.V.S. Charrington	(Nazi Germany) Alfred Ritter von Hubicki

Units involved
1st Armoured Brigade	9th Panzer Division

Strength
Unknown	Unknown

Casualties and losses
German claim: 80 tanks destroyed/abandoned 2 self-propelled AT guns British claim: 30 tanks and guns lost	German claim: 4 tanks destroyed 10 wounded British claim: 8 tanks destroyed
- Location within Greece

The Battle of Ptolemaida refers to two distinct engagements, the first around the village of Sotir north of Ptolemaida and the second around the village of Proasteion south of Ptolemaida, both fought on 13 April 1941 during the German invasion of Greece. These battles were delaying actions fought by Allied units under the overall command of the British 1st Armoured Brigade against the German 9th Panzer Division, to cover the Allied escape from their positions at Mt. Vermion toward the new defensive line of Mt.Olympus – river Aliakmon – Mt. Siniatsikon.
