= Foufas =

Foufas Φούφας
- Community
- Location within Greece
- Coordinates: 40°31.3′N 21°33.3′E
- Country: Greece
- Administrative region: West Macedonia
- Regional unit: Kozani
- Municipality: Eordaia
- Municipal unit: Mouriki
- Elevation: 670 m (2,200 ft)

Population (2021)
  - Community: 444
- Time zone: UTC+2 (EET)
  - Summer (DST): UTC+3 (EEST)
- Postal code: 500 05
- Area code: +30-2463
- Vehicle registration: ΚΖ

Foufas (Greek: Φούφας), known before 1927 as Paleochori (Greek: Παλαιοχώρι) and Paleor (Bulgarian: Палеор), is a village and a community of the Eordaia municipality. Before the 2011 local government reform it was part of the municipality of Mouriki, of which it was a municipal district. The 2021 census recorded 444 inhabitants in the village.

== History ==
In 1845 the Russian slavist Victor Grigorovich recorded Paliora as mainly Bulgarian village. Stefan Verkovich, folklorist from Bosnia, noted in 1889 that there were 50 Bulgarian and 30 Turkish houses in Paleor. On May 11, 1907 during an armed clash with the local villagers the captain from Hellenic Army Foufas (Zaharias Papadas), commander of a Greek paramilitary squad, was killed. In 1932 the village was renamed Foufas (Fufas) after the nickname of Captain Papadas.
