= Skiti =

Skiti (σκήτη) may refer to:

- A monastic community, see Skete
- Skiti, Kozani, a village in the Kozani regional unit
- Skiti, Larissa, a village in the Larissa regional unit
