= Milochori =

Milochori Μηλοχώρι
- Community
- Location within Greece
- Coordinates: 40°30′17″N 21°32′10″E
- Country: Greece
- Administrative region: Western Macedonia
- Regional unit: Kozani
- Municipality: Eordaia
- Municipal unit: Mouriki

Population (2021)
  - Community: 557
- Time zone: UTC+2 (EET)
  - Summer (DST): UTC+3 (EEST)
- Postal code: 50200
- Area code: +30 2463

Milochori (Greek: Μηλοχώρι, before 1927: Λύγκα - Lygka, Bulgarian: Лъка) is a village in the Mouriki municipal unit, northern Kozani regional unit, West Macedonia, Greece. It is located 30 km east of Ptolemaida. It is situated at an altitude of 680 meters above sea level. At the 2021 census, the population was 557.
