= Vivafm 953 =

Viva FM 95.3
Ptolemaida, Greece; Greece
- Broadcast area: Western Macedonia
- Frequency: 95.3 MHz
- Branding: Viva FM 95.3

Programming
- Language: Greek
- Format: Top 40 (CHR)

Ownership
- Owner: Stylianos Andronikidis
- Sister stations: Viva GR 102.8

History
- First air date: March 8, 1999
- Call sign meaning: Viva FM 95.3

Links
- Website: www.vivafm.com

Viva FM is a radio station broadcasting on 95.3 MHz serving Ptolemaida, Kozani, Western Macedonia. The station is a mixture of dance and Top 40, much of the hits are Τop 40. The station launched broadcasting on 8 March 1999. The main audience covers the age groups 15-45 financially independent with high educational level who reside in urban centres. His music program is determined by the current trends, in the international music scene, while promoting and radio hits that will make a difference in the future.

== Slogan ==
Its slogan is The best way is the music way!
