= Popoli, Kastoria =

Historical region of Western Macedonia

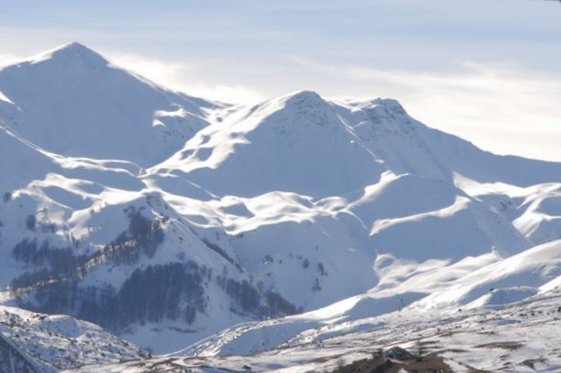
Mount Verno (or Vitsi), the northern geographical limit of the historical region of Popoli.

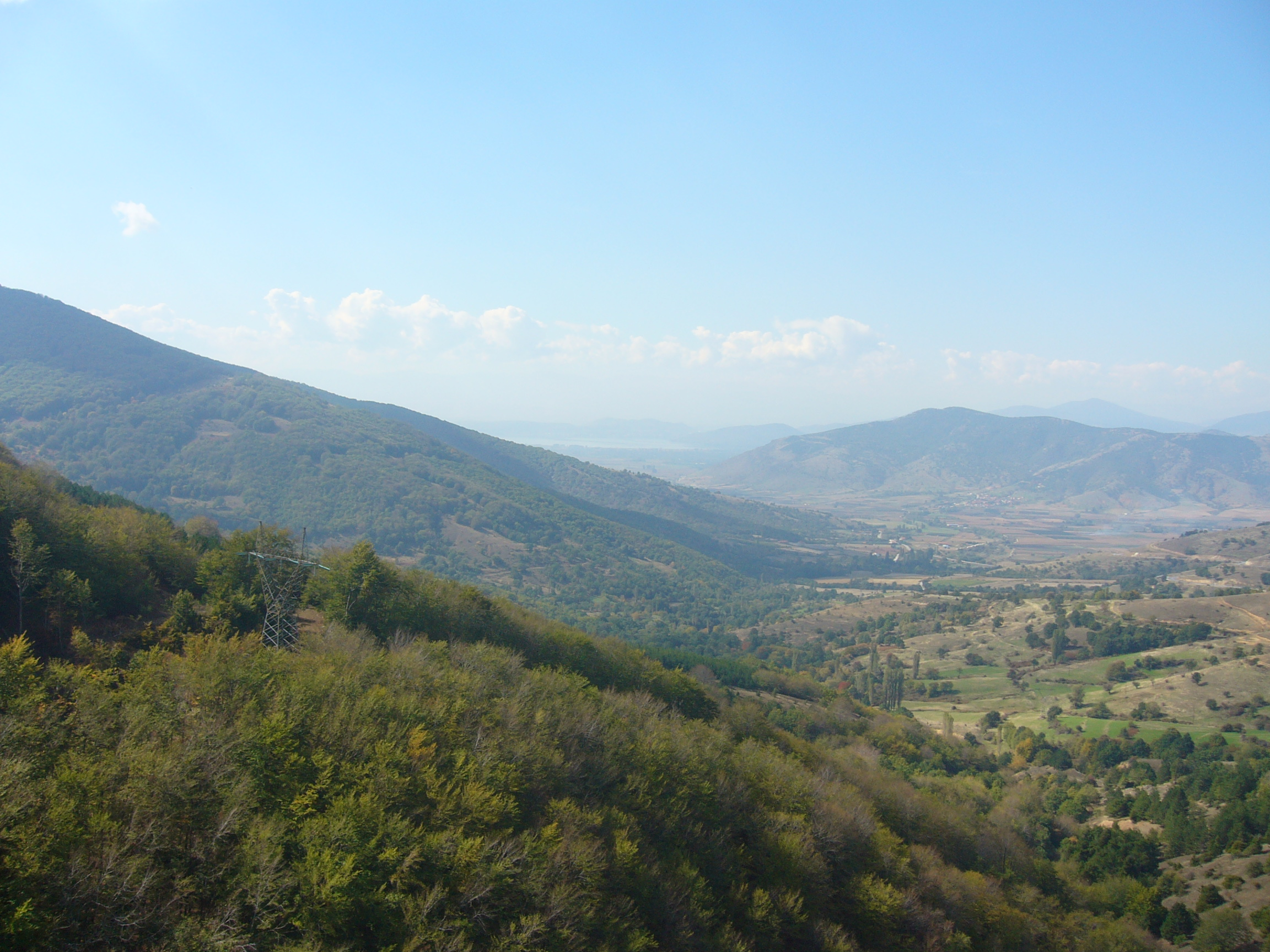
Mount Korisos (or Gavros), part of the mountain complex of Askio, the southern geographical limit of the area of Popoli.

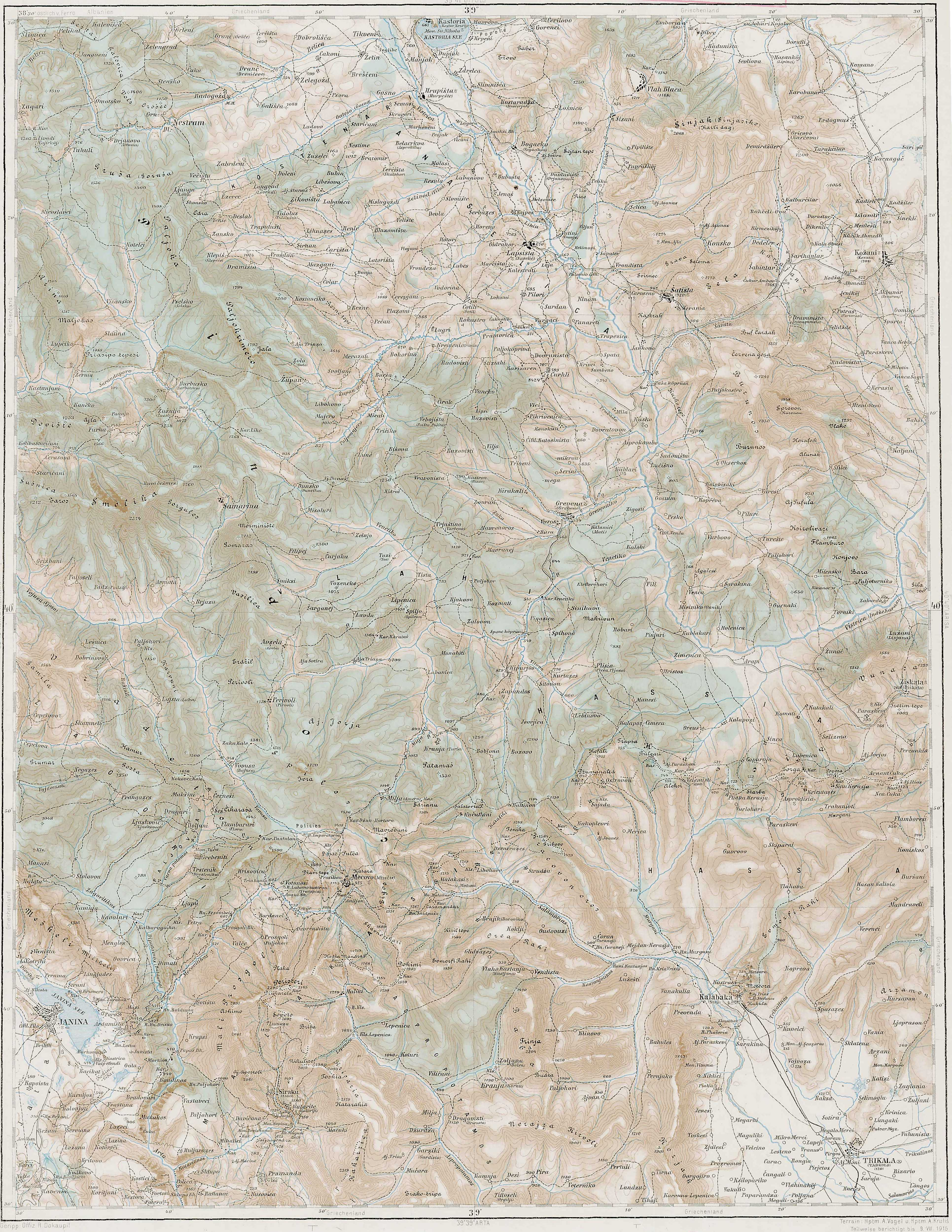
General Map of Central Europe of the Austrohungarian Empire from 1887. It references on the top part, next o the lake of Kastoria, the area of Popoli (Popole).

Popoli is a historical region in Kastoria regional unit of Western Macedonia, Greece, between the cities of Kastoria and Klisoura.

== Geography ==
The area contains the settlements located to the north and east of the lake of Kastoria, on the southern foot of mount Verno (Vitsi) and on the northern foot of mount Askio (Siniatsiko).
