= Vivagr 102.8 =

Viva GR 102.8
Ptolemaida, Greece; Greece
- Broadcast area: Western Macedonia
- Frequency: 102.8 MHz

Programming
- Language: Greek
- Format: Top 40 (CHR)

Ownership
- Owner: Lazaros Iliadis
- Sister stations: Viva FM 95.3

History
- First air date: 1990s (Fasma 103 FM); 2011 (Viva GR 102.8); 2023 (True Story)
- Former call signs: Fasma / Viva GR
- Former frequencies: 103 MHz

Links
- Website: www.vivafm.com truestoryradio.gr

Viva GR was a radio station broadcasting on 102.8 MHz serving Ptolemaida, Kozani, Western Macedonia. The station is a mixture of Greek music. The station was originally launched broadcasting on 1 August 2011. The main audience covers the age groups 15-45 financially independent with high educational level who reside in urban centres.

His music program is determined by the current trends in the Greek music scene while promoting and radio hits that will make a difference in the future.

In 2023 split into two radio stations. Viva GR switched to internet radio while 102.8 FM replaced by True Story Radio due to a change in ownership, broadcasting an informative program.

== Slogan ==
Its slogan is Greek music at its best!
