= Askio =

Mountain range in Greece

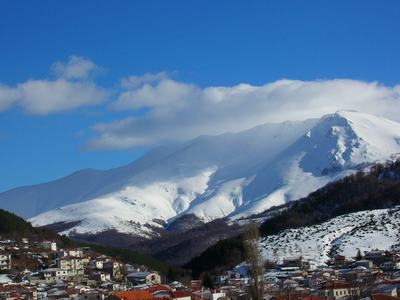

Highest point
- Peak: Siniatsiko
- Elevation: 2,111 m (6,926 ft)
- Coordinates: 40°24′23″N 21°33′24″E

Dimensions
- Length: 30 km (19 mi) NW-SE
- Width: 20 km (12 mi) NE-SW

Naming
- Native name: Άσκιο (Greek)

Geography
- Location within Greece
- Country: Greece
- Regional units: Kozani and Kastoria

Askio (Greek: Άσκιο; Pronunciation: As•ki•o) is a mountain range in the northwestern part of the Kozani and the eastern part of the Kastoria regional units in northern Greece. The elevation of its highest peak, Siniatsiko, is 2,111 m (6,926 ft). There are forests in the northern part. It stretches from the village Kleisoura in the northwest to Xirolimni in the southeast, over a length of about 30 km (19 mi). The nearest mountains are the Verno to the northwest, the Vourinos to the south and the Vermio to the northeast. It is drained by tributaries of the Aliakmonas to the west and south, and towards the Lake Vegoritida to the northeast.

The nearest towns are Siatista to the south, Ptolemaida to the northeast and Kozani to the southeast. Mountain villages in the Askio mountains include Vlasti in the central part, Eratyra and Skiti in the south and Milochori, Anarrachi, Variko and Kleisoura in the north. The A2 Egnatia Odos motorway (Igoumenitsa - Ioannina - Kozani - Thessaloniki) runs south of the mountains.

== See also ==
- List of mountains in Greece
