= Anarrachi =

Village in the Mouriki municipal unit, northern Kozani regional unit, Greece

Anarrachi Αναρράχη
- Community
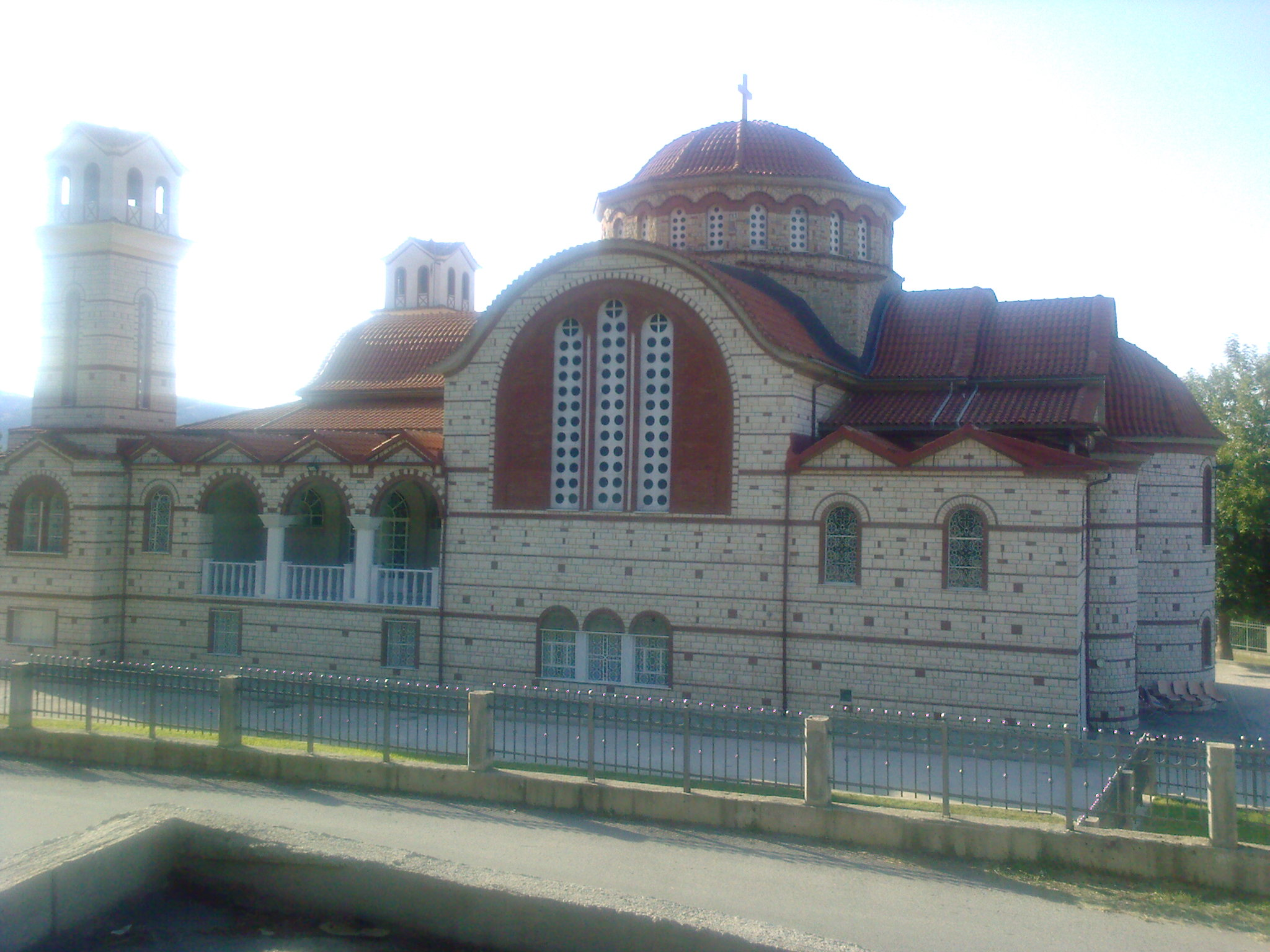
- Church of Anarrachi

- Location within Greece
- Coordinates: 40°29′34″N 21°34′18″E
- Country: Greece
- Administrative region: Western Macedonia
- Regional unit: Kozani
- Municipality: Eordaia
- Municipal unit: Mouriki

Population (2021)
  - Community: 753
- Time zone: UTC+2 (EET)
  - Summer (DST): UTC+3 (EEST)
- Postal code: 50200
- Area code: +30 2463

Anarrachi (Greek: Αναρράχη, before 1927: Δέβρη - Devri, Macedonian: Дебрец, Turkish: Debre) is a small village in the Mouriki municipal unit, northern Kozani regional unit, Greece. It is situated at an altitude of 709 meters above sea level. The population was 753 at the 2021 census.
