= Emporio, Kozani =

Emporio Εμπόριο
- Community
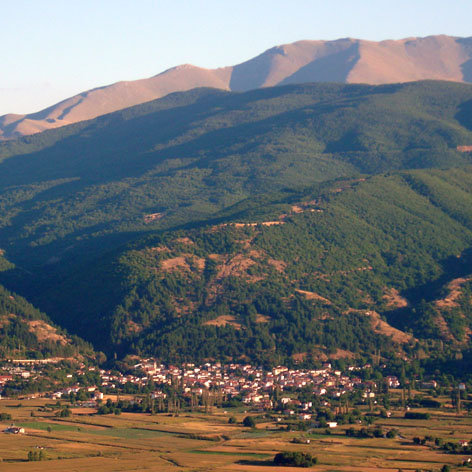
- A view of Emporio

- Location within Greece
- Coordinates: 40°29.3′N 21°33.45′E
- Country: Greece
- Administrative region: West Macedonia
- Regional unit: Kozani
- Municipality: Eordaia
- Municipal unit: Mouriki
- Elevation: 690 m (2,260 ft)

Population (2021)
  - Community: 744
- Time zone: UTC+2 (EET)
  - Summer (DST): UTC+3 (EEST)
- Postal code: 500 05
- Area code: +30-2463
- Vehicle registration: ΚΖ

Emporio (Greek: Εμπόριο) is a village and a community of the Eordaia municipality. Before the 2011 local government reform it was part of the municipality of Mouriki, of which it was a municipal district and the seat. The 2021 census recorded 744 inhabitants in the village.

== History ==
According to Ottoman document from 1626 to 1627, there were 71 Christian households in the village in the first half of the 17th century.

== Notable natives ==
- Kroum Pindoff, Bulgarian-Canadian businessman
