= Vlasti =

Vlasti Βλάστη
- Municipal unit
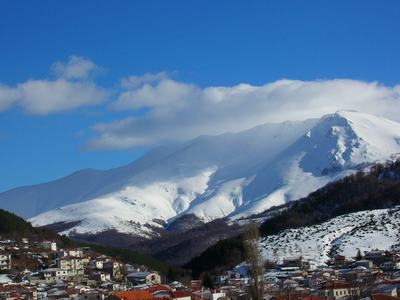
- Vlasti with Askio in the background.

- Location within the regional unit

- Location within Greece
- Coordinates: 40°27′N 21°31′E
- Country: Greece
- Administrative region: West Macedonia
- Regional unit: Kozani
- Municipality: Eordaia

Area
  - Municipal unit: 72.089 km^{2} (27.834 sq mi)
- Elevation: 1,180 m (3,870 ft)

Population (2021)
  - Municipal unit: 326
  - Municipal unit density: 4.52/km^{2} (11.7/sq mi)
- Time zone: UTC+2 (EET)
  - Summer (DST): UTC+3 (EEST)
- Postal code: 500 09
- Area code: +30-2463
- Vehicle registration: KZ

Vlasti (Greek: Βλάστη, before 1927: Βλάτση, Vlatsi; Aromanian: Blatsa) is a village and a community of the Eordaia municipality. Before the 2011 local government reform it was an independent community. The 2021 census recorded 326 inhabitants in the village. The community of Vlasti covers an area of 72.089 km^{2}.

== History ==
The first settlement was established in the 15th century and received an influx of Vlach refugees from Grammos and Moschopoli in the 18th century. The public buildings and the houses which still today adorn Vlasti reflect the flourishing of this village in the 19th century.

According to the statistics of Vasil Kanchov ("Macedonia, Ethnography and Statistics"), 1.300 Vlachs and 1.200 Greek Christians lived in the village in 1900.

== Geography ==
Located at the heart of western Macedonia, it is girdled by the massifs of Mt Mouriki which serves as a home not only to the brown bear (Ursus arctos), but also to a large number of rare birds, including the short-toed eagle (Circaetus gallicus), the Egyptian vulture (Neophron percnopterus) and the long-legged buzzard (Buteo rufinus).

== Tourism ==
The village bustles with life in summer as it is then that the Earth Festival is organized. It simultaneously comprises a series of ecological and joyful events, whose objective is to inform and sensitize people, highlighting the importance of respecting the natural environment. Moreover, visitors have the chance to interact with the locals, experience their hospitality, and participate alongside them in these festivities. Vlasti serves a starting point for routes either to Mt Mouriki and its shelter or to neighbouring regions. There is infrastructure to support the touristic development of the place with hotels, restaurants and bars.

== Notable natives ==
- Ioannis Farmakis (1772 - 1821) revolutionary leader of the Greek War of Independence
- Konstantinos Dosios, lawyer and politician
- Nikolaus Doumbas, an Austrian industrialist and liberal politician of Aromanian descent from Vlasti

== See also ==
- List of settlements in the Kozani regional unit
