= Kroum Pindoff =

Kroum Pindoff (Bulgarian: Крум Пиндов) (1915 – 16 January 2013) was a Bulgarian Canadian businessman.

Pindoff was born in Emporio, Eordaia municipality, Kozani regional unit, Greece, and raised in Bulgaria. Pindoff participated in the Second World War as part of the Bulgarian Army, and their allies the Germans. Later when Bulgaria joined the Allies, he fought against the German Army. He and Eva, his German-born wife, both survivors of the war, arrived in Canada in 1955 as immigrants with one single purpose in life: to make enough money to aid innocent victims of war.

Forming a company called Pindoff Record Sales in 1960, he began selling records on consignment to a variety of stores in Toronto, Ontario. By 1970, Eva became the Founding President of Music World, a company formed to market a variety of music products. Music World once consisted of 110 outlets Canada-wide with over 1,000 employees. Music World Limited was eventually sold, the buyer suffered the same fate as many record stores and was eventually liquidated by Hilco and Gordon Brothers Group. All 110 of its Canada-wide outlets closed in February 2008. The couple celebrated 50 years of their marriage in the year 2000. They recently pledged five million dollars to the Red Cross to help landmine victims become survivors. As philanthropists, both Kroum and Eva contributed more than 20,000 food parcels to senior citizens in Bulgaria following the implosion of the Eastern Bloc in 1991. The Pindoffs recently built a home for 100 children in Orahavica, Gasinci, Croatia.
