= Plateia =

Greek word for town square

Plateia or Platia (πλατεία) is the Greek word for town square. Most Greek and Cypriot cities have several town squares which are a point of reference in travelling and guiding. In traditional societies like villages and provincial communities, plateies are the central places for feasts, celebrations, events and meetings.

== Ancient Greek Cities ==
The original ancient Greek word (plural plateiai) meant one of the (usually 3) main streets in an ancient Greek city such as Naples. The stenopoi, narrower, mainly north-south, streets were placed between the plateia in the orthogonal town plan to form rectangular blocks for buildings.

== Notable squares (plateies) in Greece ==
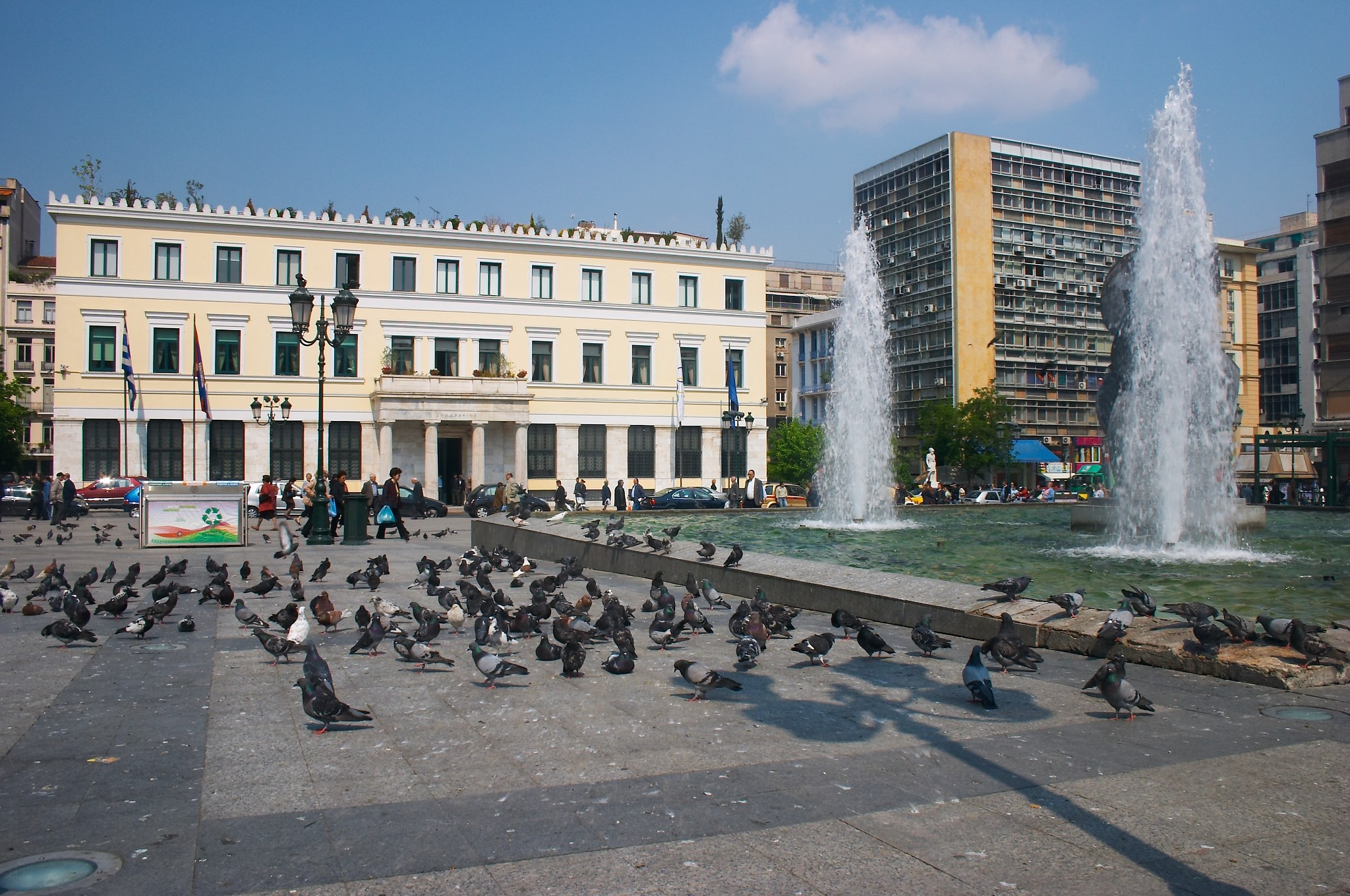
Kotzia Square, Athens

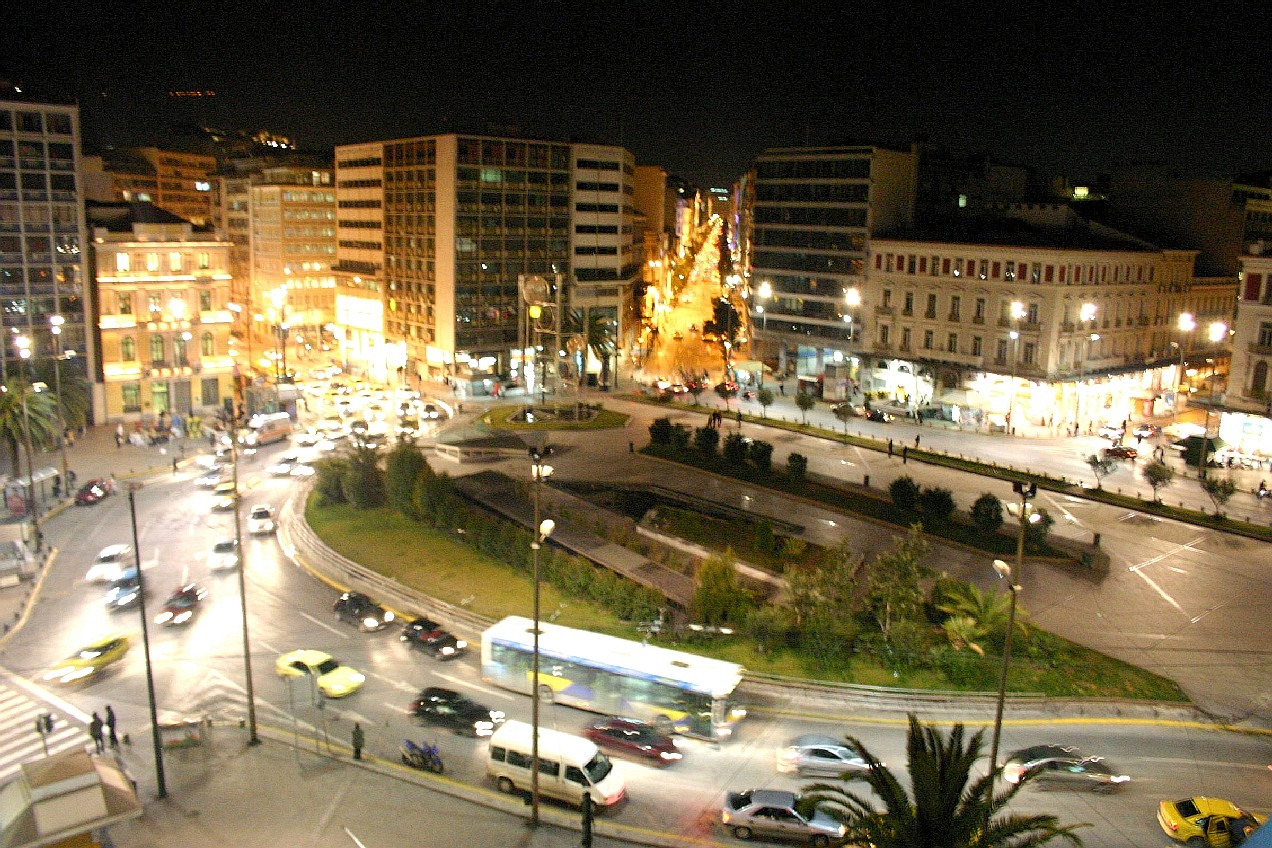
Omonia Square, Athens

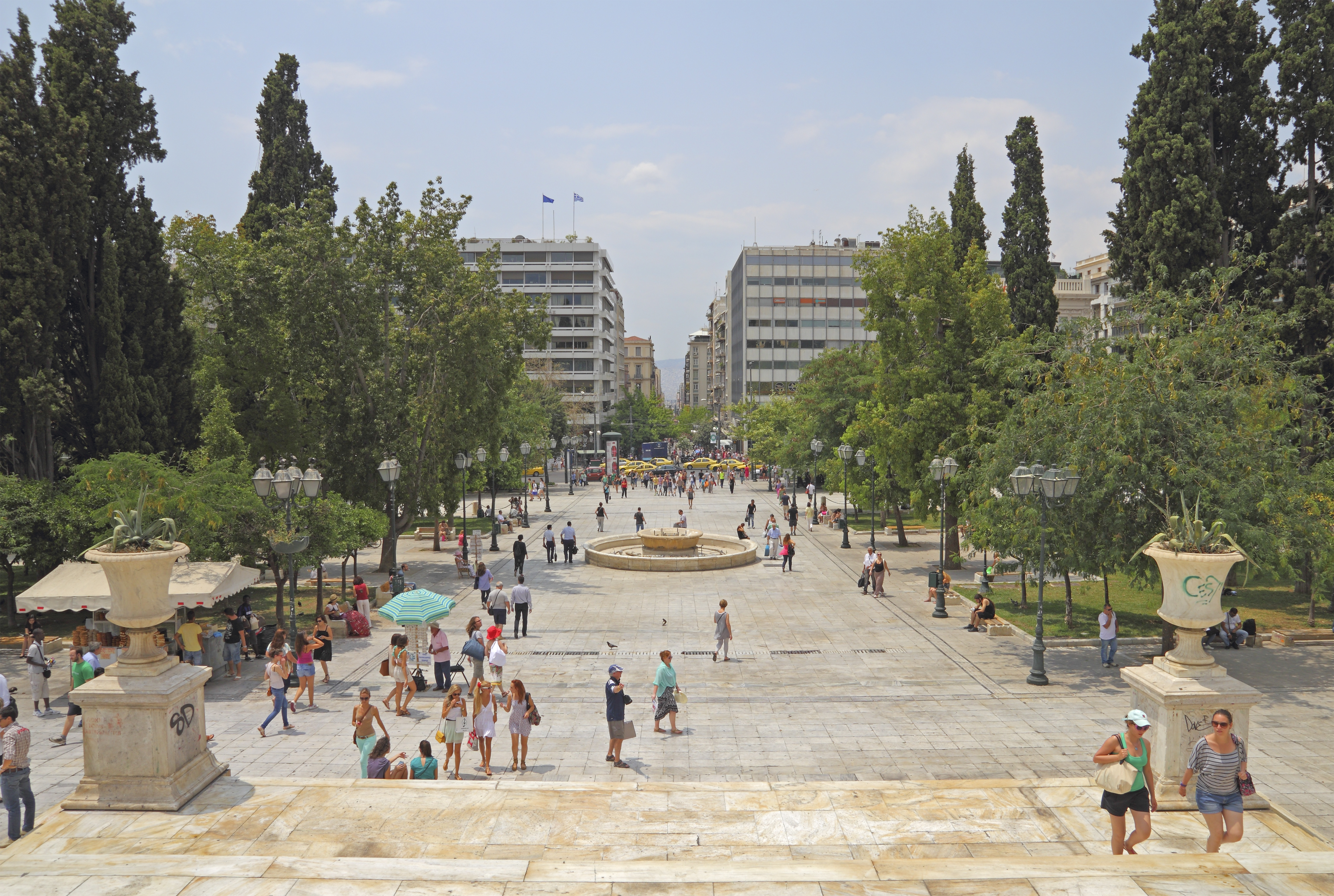
Syntagma Square, Athens

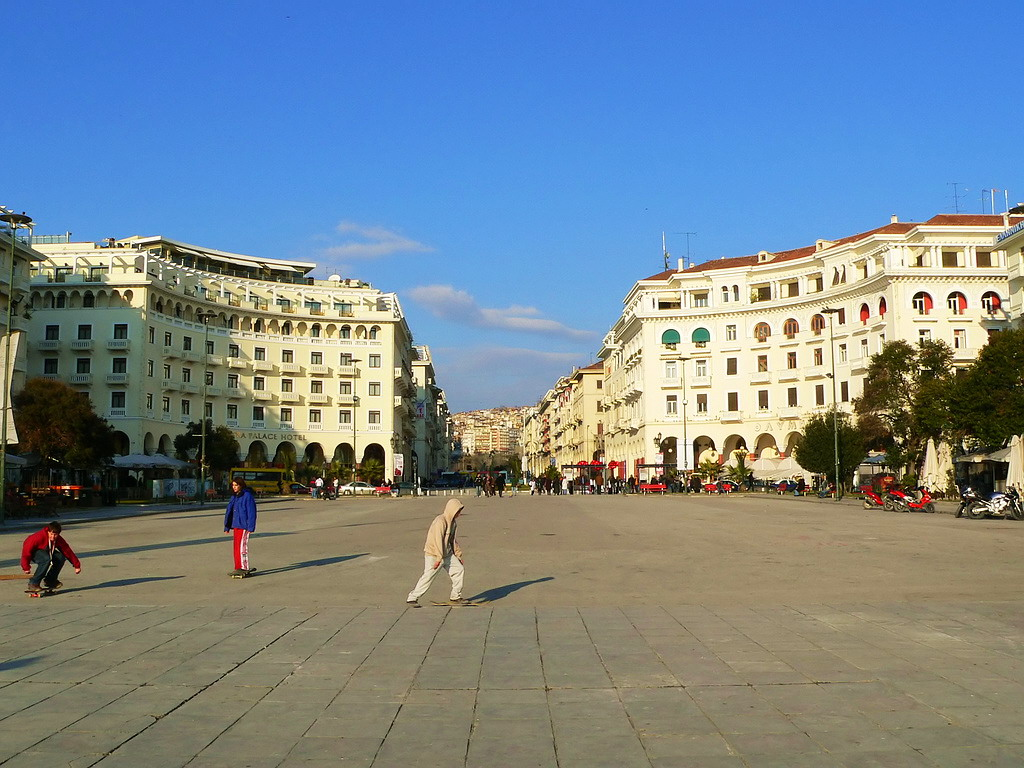
Aristotelous Square, Thessaloniki

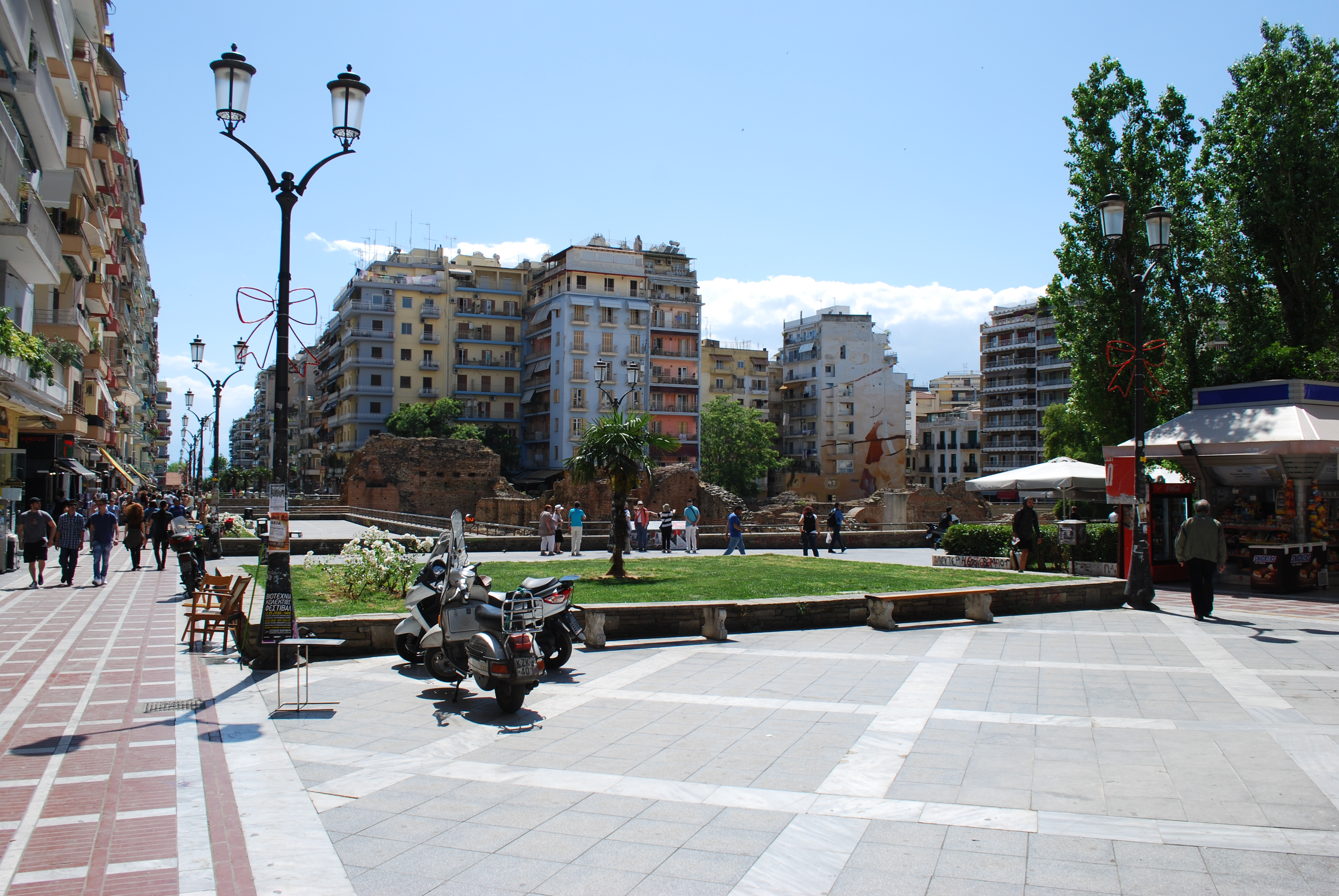
Navarinou Square, Thessaloniki

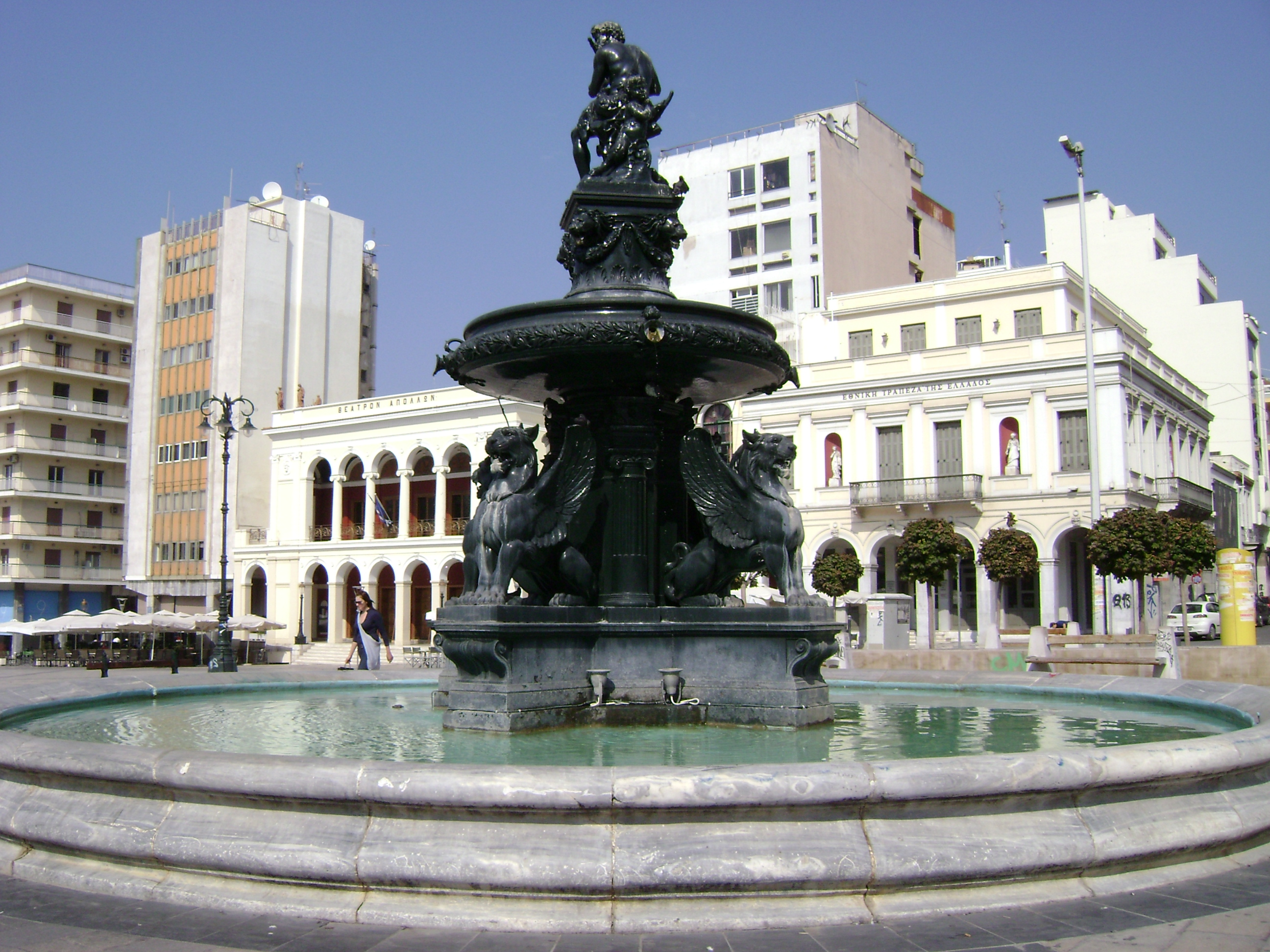
Georgiou I Square, Patras

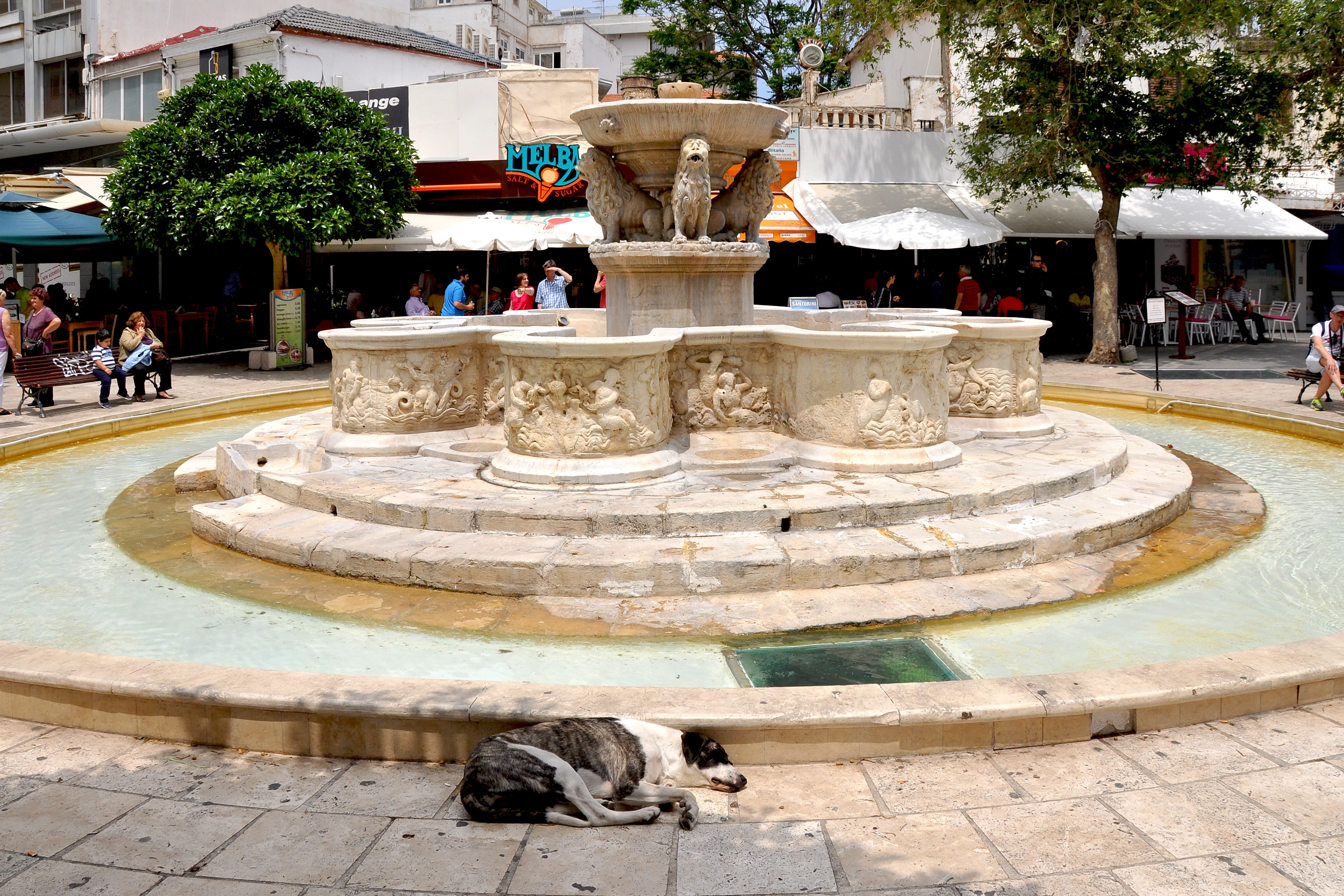
Lions Square, Heraklion

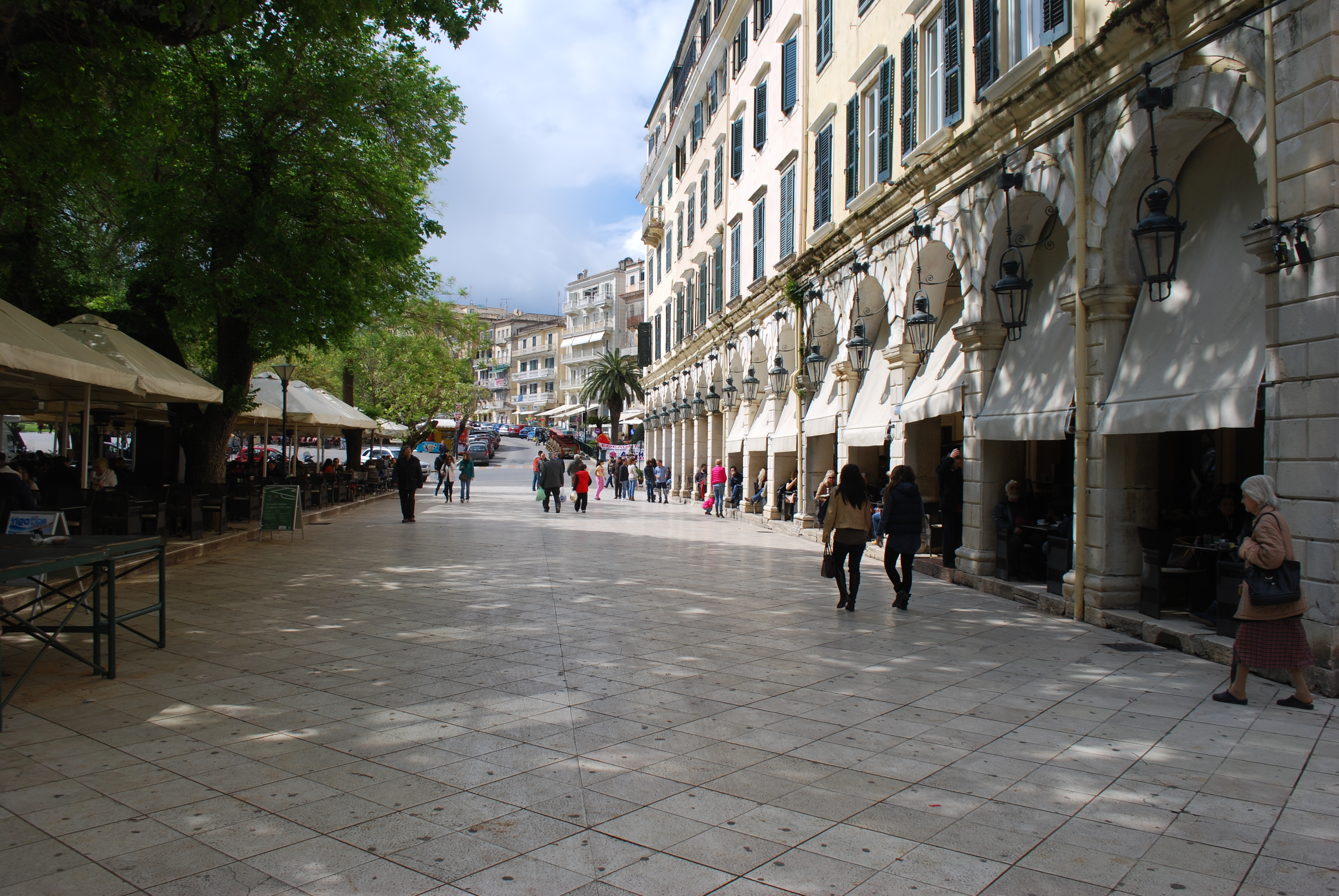
Spianada Square, Corfu

- Athens:
  - Amerikis Square - Patissia
  - Eleftherias Square
  - Exarcheion Square - Exarcheia
  - Iroon Square - Psyri
  - Karaiskaki Square - Metaxourgeio
  - Klauthmonos Square
  - Koliatsou Square
  - Kolonaki Square - Kolonaki
  - Kotzia Square (by the city hall of Athens)
  - Koumoundourou Square
  - Kypselis Square - Kypseli, Athens
  - Lysikratous Square - Plaka
  - Mavili Square
  - Mitropoleos Square (by the Metropolitan Cathedral of Athens)
  - Monastiraki Square
  - Omonoia Square (Plateia Omonoias, Concord Square)
  - Pagratiou Square - Pagrati
  - Syntagma Square (Constitution Square, Greek: Plateia Syntagmatos)
  - Viktoria Square
- Suburban Athens:
  - Agia Paraskevi Square - Agia Paraskevi
  - Iroon Square - Ano Liosia
  - Agia Triada Square - Argyroupoli
  - Chalandriou Square - Chalandri
  - Dourou Square - Chalandri
  - Karaiskaki Square - Ilioupoli
  - Davaki Square Plateia Davaki - Kallithea, SW of Athens
  - Plateia Othonos - Neo Irakleio
  - Aristotelous Square, Athens - Thrakomakedones
  - Iroon Square (Plateia Iroon) - Vrilissia
- Pavlou Mela Square Plateia Pavlou Mela - Axioupoli
- Central Square Kentriki Plateia - Didymoteicho
- Egon Square - Edessa
- Eleftherias Square - Feres
- Central Square Kentriki Plateia - Filiatra
- Central Square Kentriki Plateia - Fyli
- Agia Triada Square - Glyka Nera
- Marathonas Square - Grammatiko
- Bakogiannis Square - Heraklia
- Daskalogiannis Square Plateia Daskalogianni (named after Daskalogiannis) - Heraklio
- Elefterias Square - Plateia Elefterias - Katerini
- Agoras Square (meaning Market Square) Plateia Agoras - Kilkis
- Vizyinou Square - Komotini
- Nikis Square - Plateia Nikis - Kozani
- Lassani Square - Plateia Lassani - Kozani
- Laou Square - Lamia
- Agiou Dimitriou Square - Lechaina
- Christos Elkomenos Square - Monemvasia
- Sapphous Square - Mytilene
- Plateia Syntagmatos and Trion Navarchon Square - Nafplio
- Patras:
  - Agia Sofia Square (in the Agia Sofia neighbourhood)
  - Georgiou I Square (Dimokratias)
  - Marouda Square - a square featuring the statue of Konstantinos Giannias
  - Olga Square Plateia Olgas(Ethnikis Antistasis)
  - Pyrosvesteio Square (in the Pyrosvesteio neighborhood)
  - A square in the Agios Andreas neighborhood by Trion Navarcheion Street
  - A square in the Agios Dionyssios neighborhood
  - A square by Agiou Nikolaou Street near the Port of Patras
  - A square at the east end of Dimitri Gounari Street near the Drosia neighbourhood
  - A square in the Tsivdi neighborhood
  - A square on Akrotiriou Street by Damaskou
  - A square by Akrotiriou Street near Evvoias Street
  - A square on Georgiou Olympou Street
- Two squares on Lontou Street
  - Ypsila Alonia Square Plateia Ypsila Alonia - all in Patras
- Korai Square Plateia Korai - Piraeus
- Eleftherias Square - Rhodes
- Eleftherias Square - Servia
- Agias Mimas Square - Spetses
- Aristotelous Square - Thessaloniki
- Eleftherias Square - Thessaloniki
- Kennedy Square, and two others - Tripoli
- Riga Fereou Square - Volos
- Kampana Square - Kefalonia

== In Cyprus ==
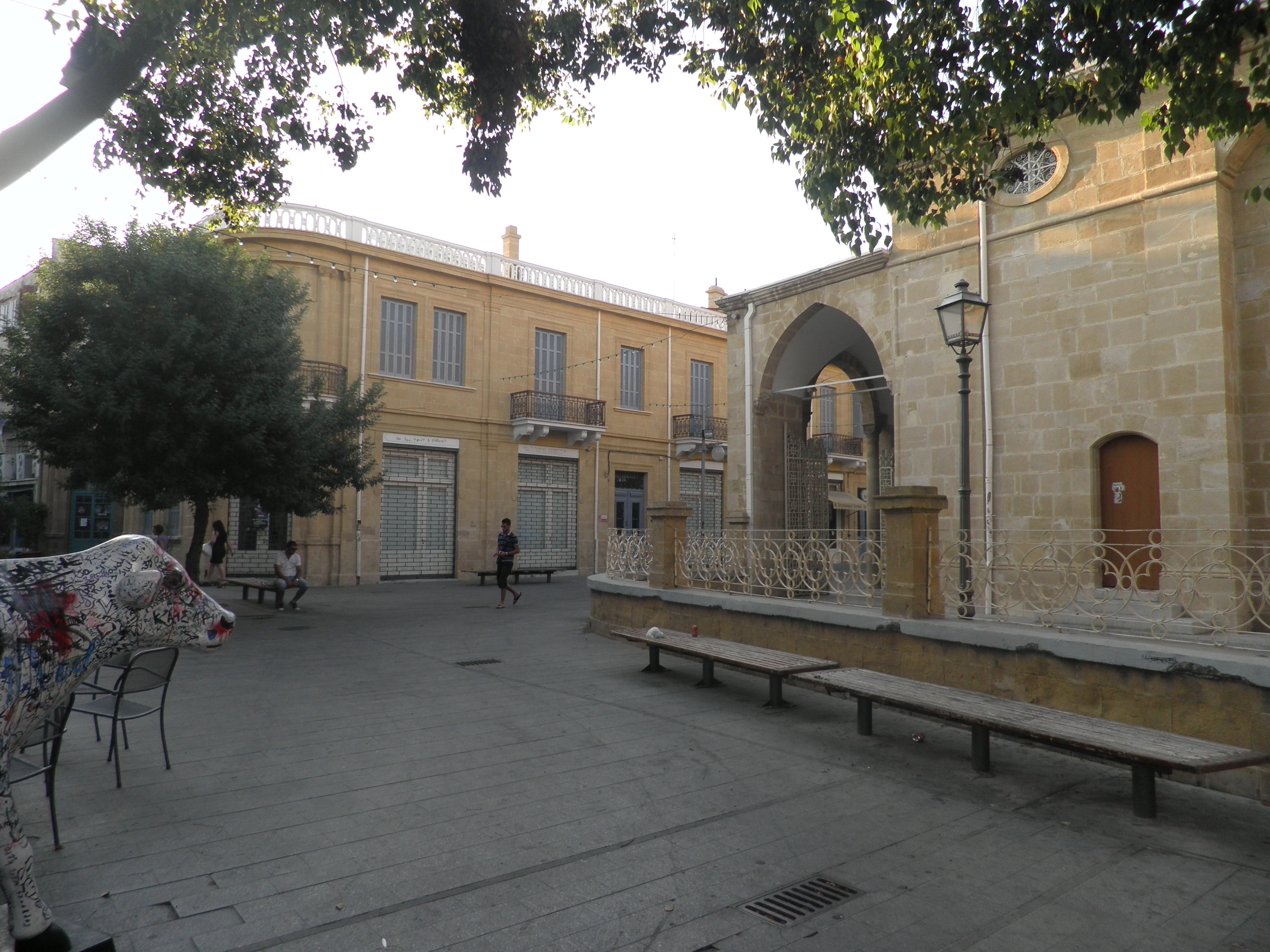
Faneromeni Square, Nicosia

- Eleftheria Square - Nicosia
- Faneromeni Square - Nicosia
- Solomos Square - Nicosia
- Eleftheria Square - Larnaca
- Troodos Square - Troodos Mountains; used as a point of reference for meteorological, (time) distance and altitude purposes.

== See also ==
- Agora
- List of city squares
- List of fountains in Greece
- Market square
- Town square
- Roman Forum
- Forum (Roman)

== Gallery ==
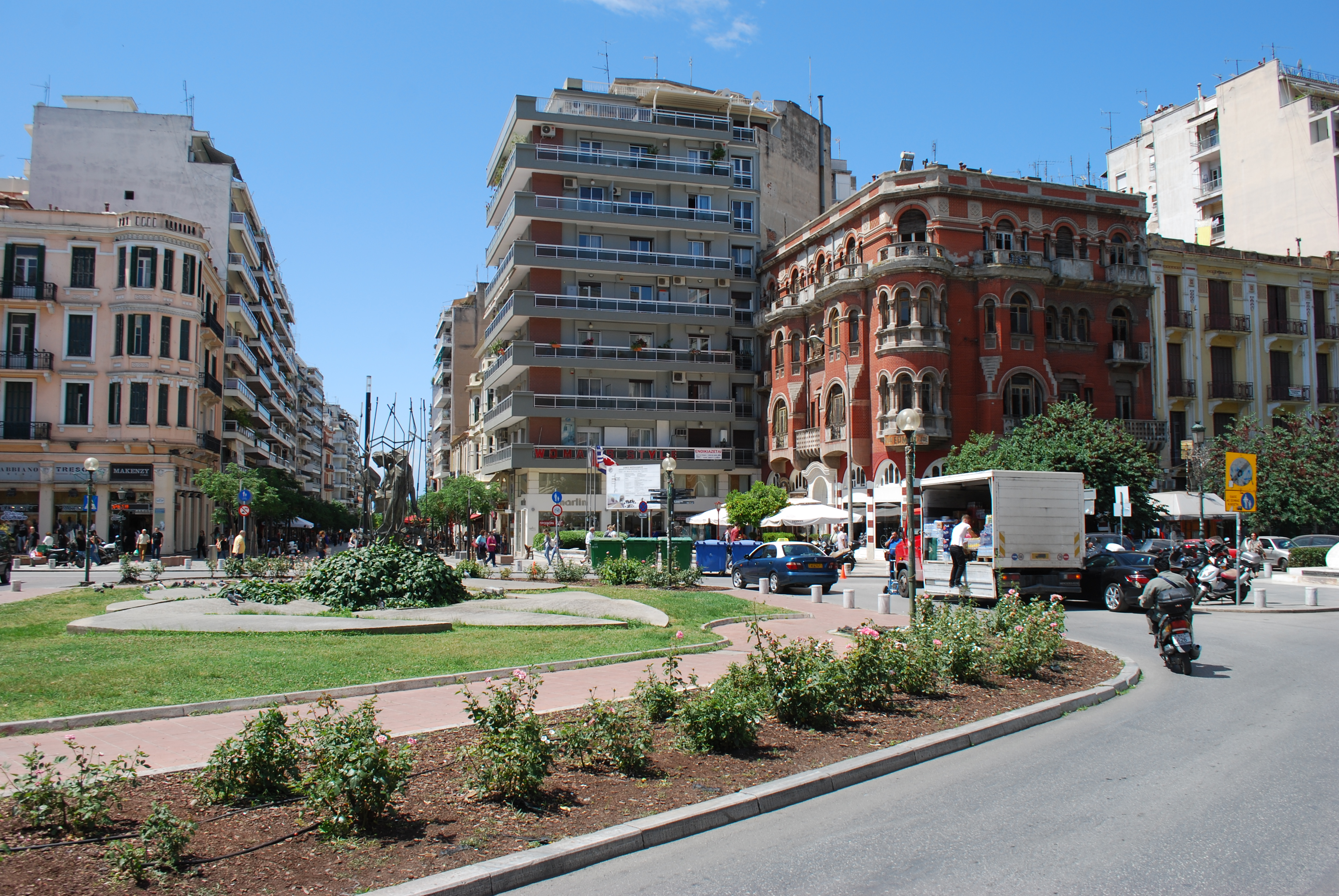
Agias Sofias Square, Thessaloniki

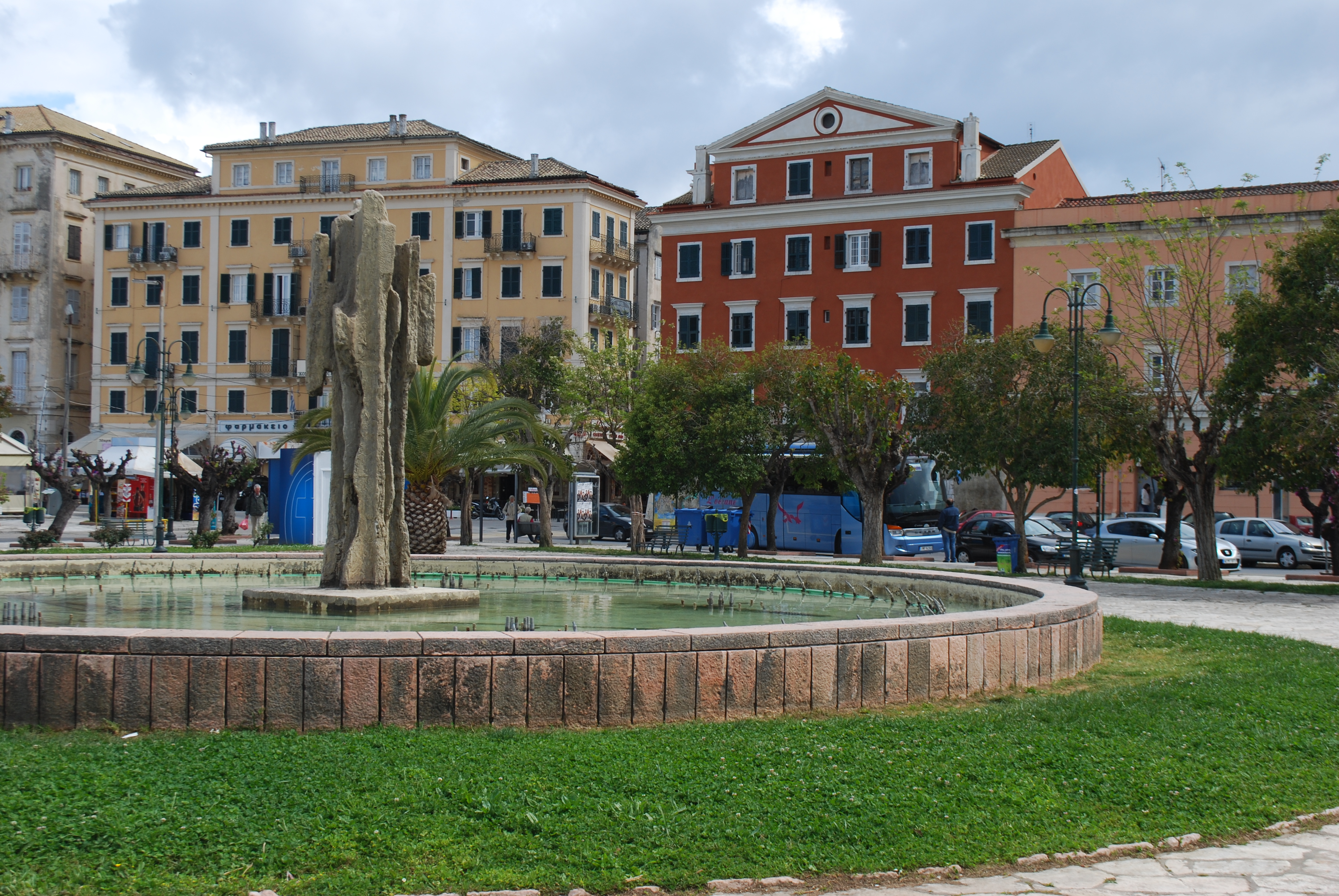
Spilias Square, Corfu (city)

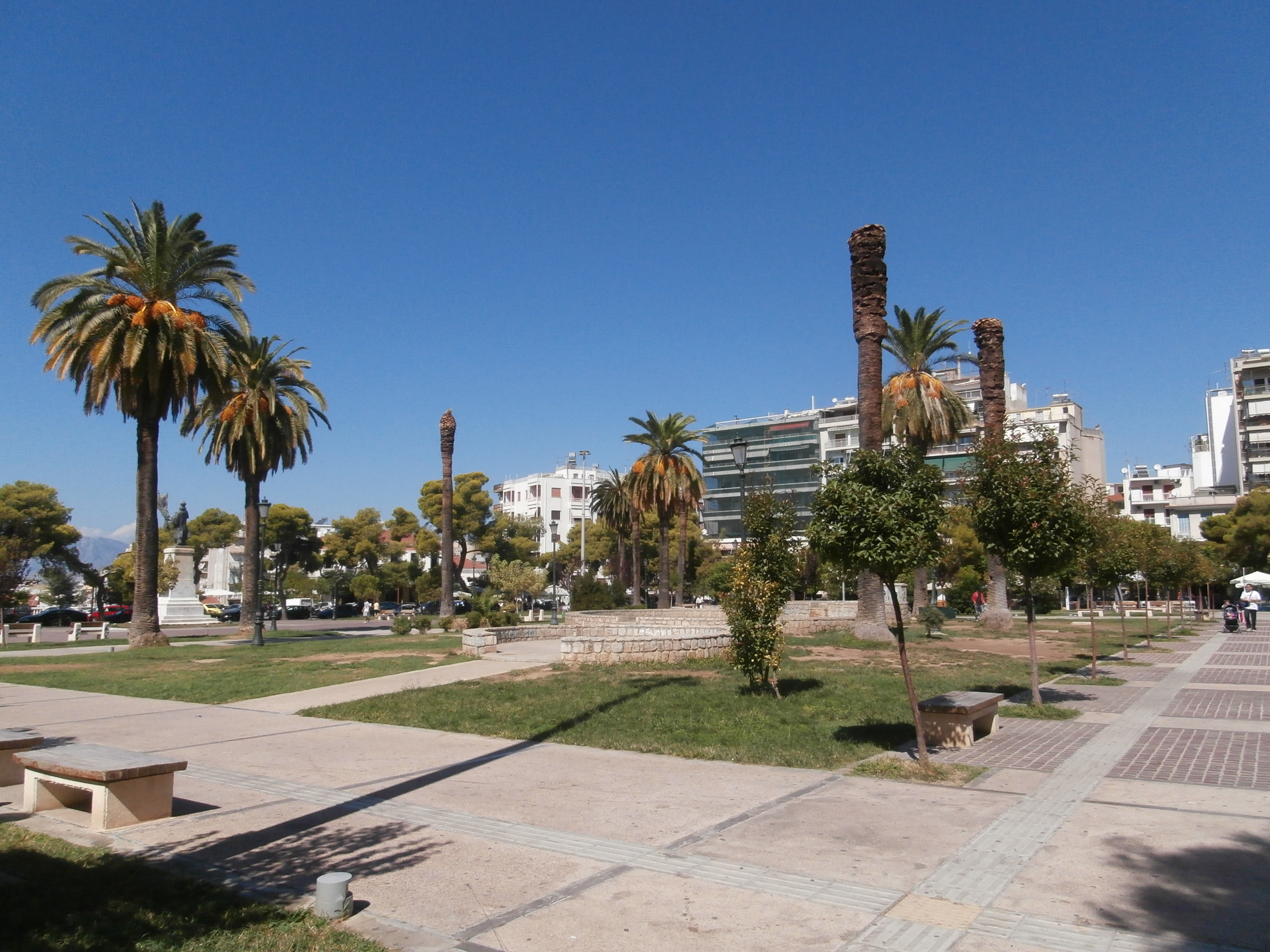
Psilalonia Square, Patras

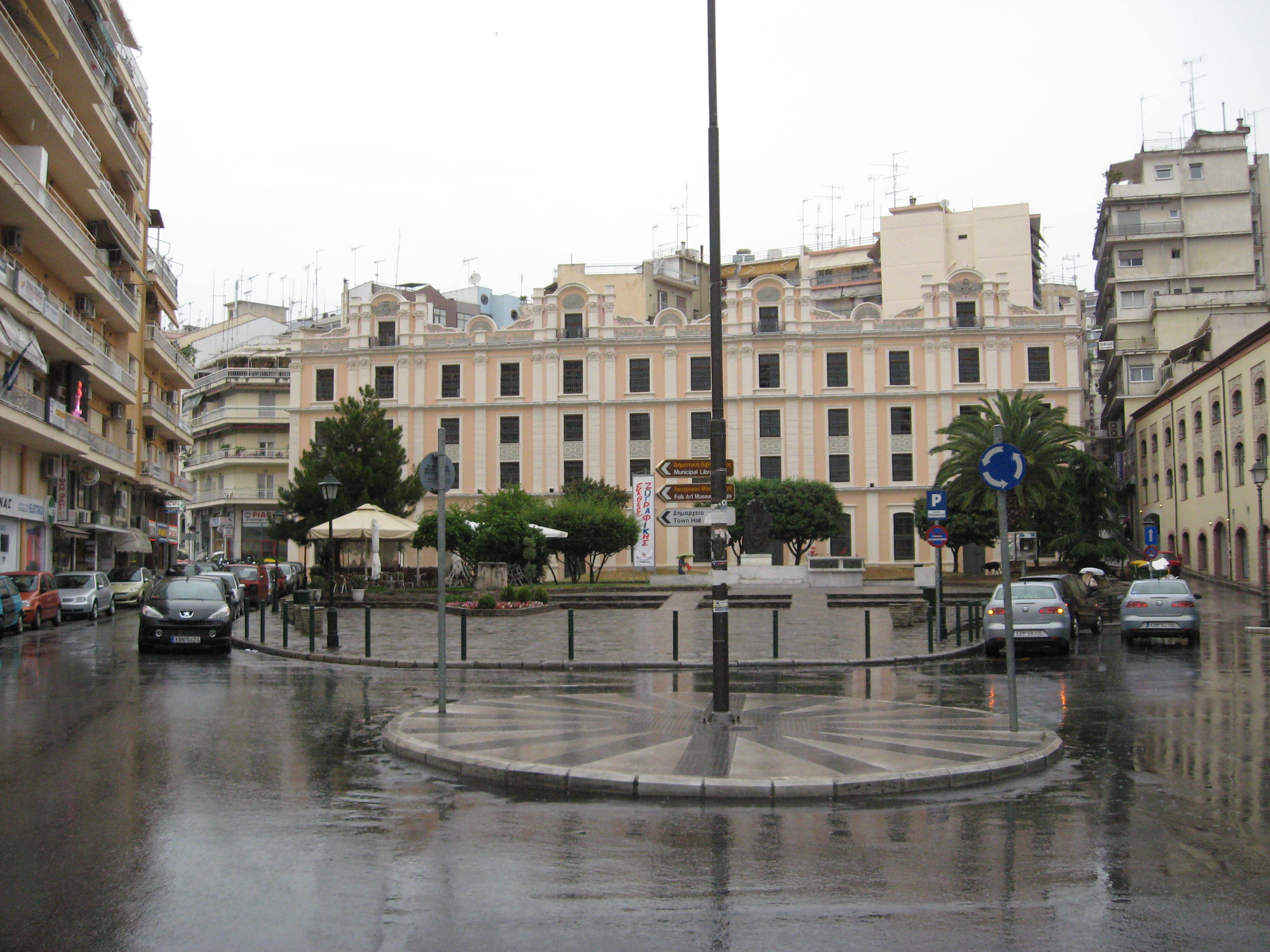
Kapnergati Square, Kavala

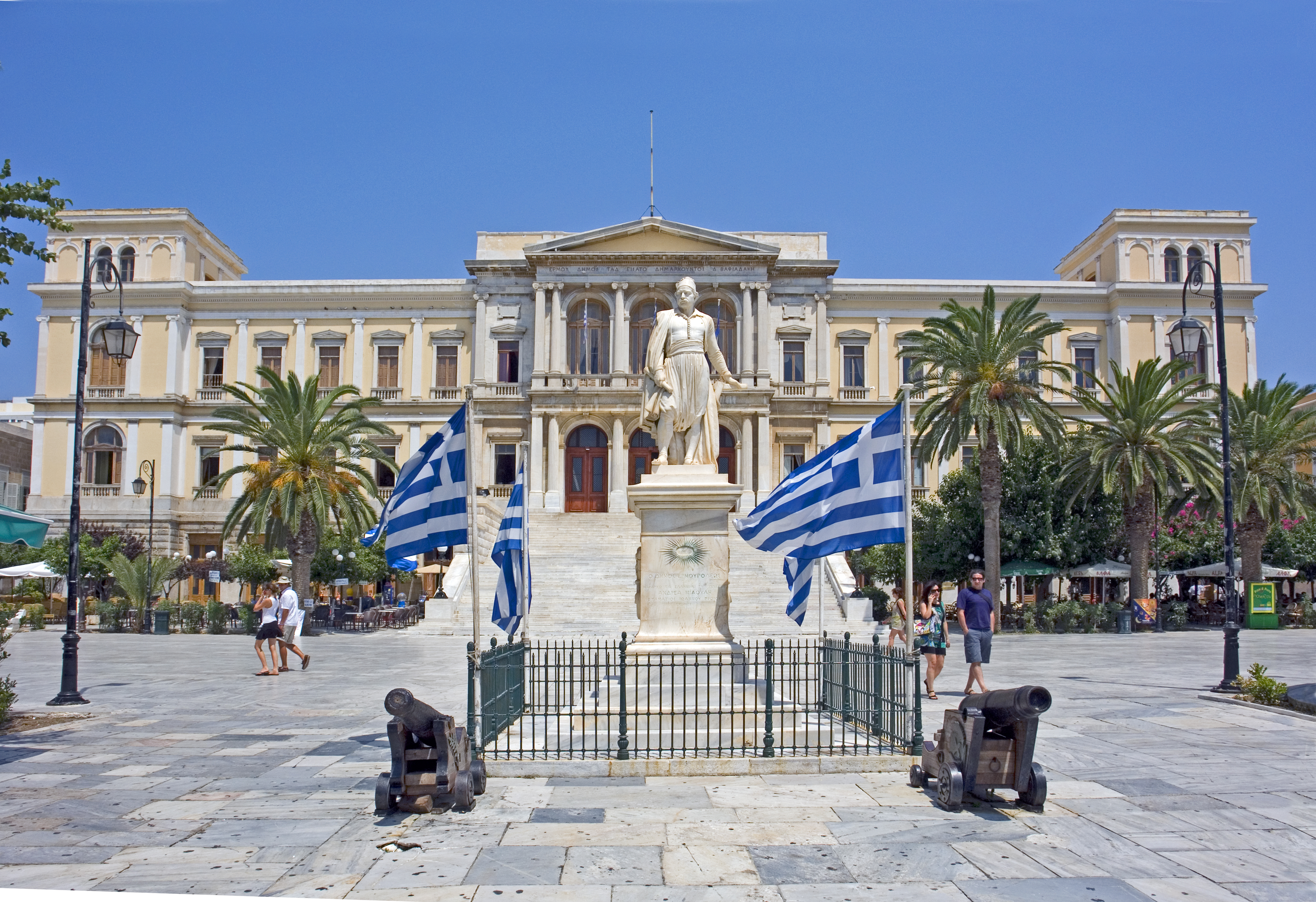
Miaouli Square, Ermoupoli

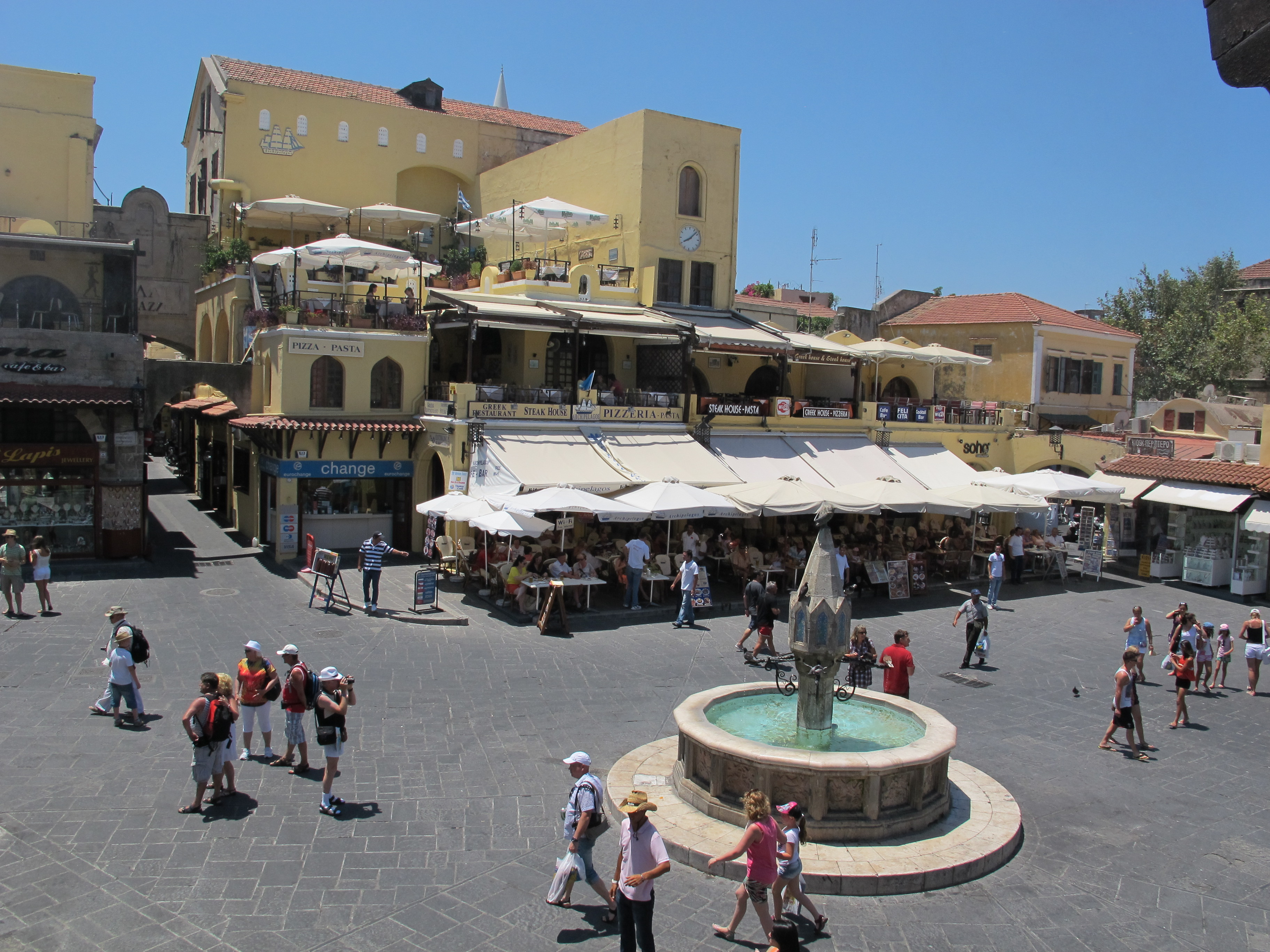
Ippokratous Square, Rhodes (city)

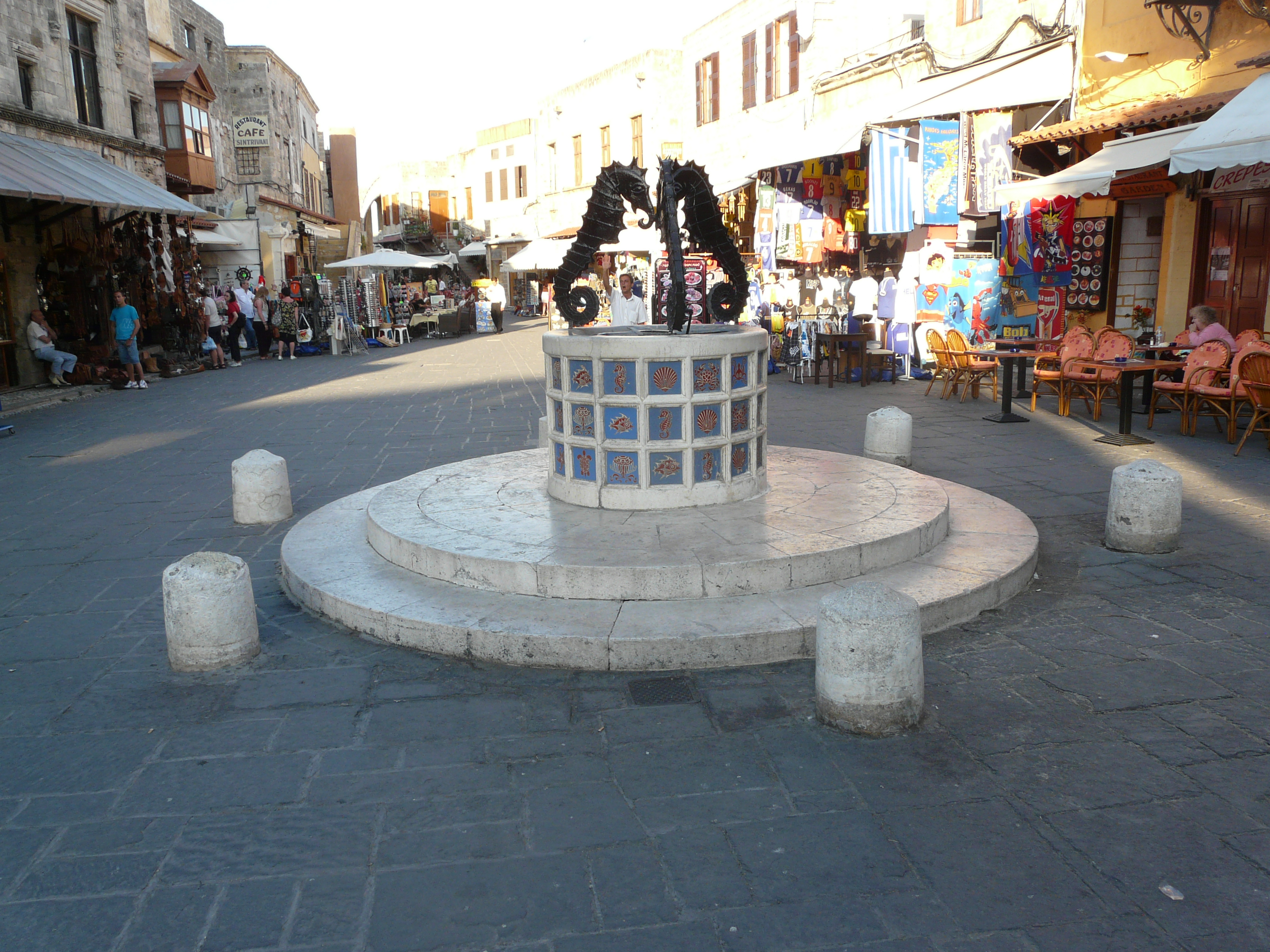
Square of the Jewish Martyrs, Rhodes (city)

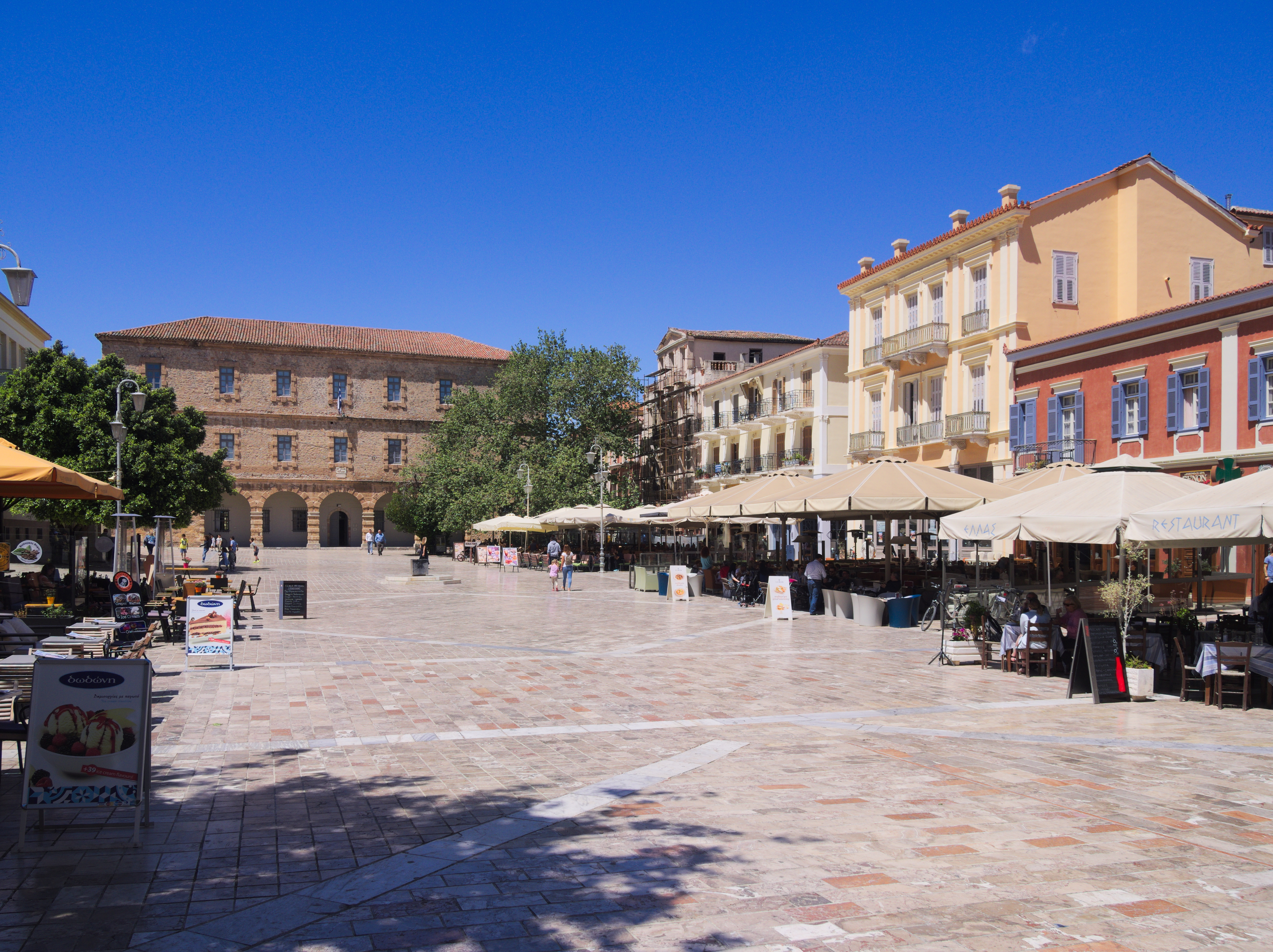
Syntagma Square, Nafplion
