= Mazlum Kayalar =

Turkish politician

Mazlum Kayalar (1911 – 3 February 1972) was a Turkish politician.

He was born in Kayılar district in Macedonia (then part of the Turkish Empire).

He was a graduate of Istanbul University Faculty of Law. He served as Bursa Judge's Office, Çanakkale Deputy General Manager, Ministry of Finance Consultant Advocate, and Free Lawyer.

He was a member of the Grand National Assembly of Turkey representing the Democrat Party under Adnan Menderes.

He was married and has two children. He died in Istanbul on February 3, 1972.
