= Paleontological and History Museum of Ptolemais =

- Παλαιοντολογικό Ιστορικό Μουσείο Πτολεμαΐδας
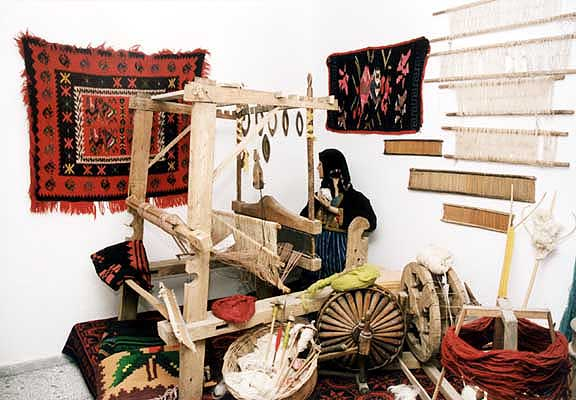
- Part of the museum's folklore collection
- Former name: Anthropological and Folklore Museum of Ptolemais (Greek: Ανθρωπολογικό και Λαογραφικό Μουσείο Πτολεμαΐδας)
- Established: 1997
- Location: Ptolemaida, Greece
- Coordinates: 40.5077161°N 21.6825439°E
- Type: History museum Art museum
- Founder: Municipality of Ptolemaida

The Paleontological and History Museum of Ptolemais (Greek: Παλαιοντολογικό Ιστορικό Μουσείο Πτολεμαΐδας), former Anthropological and Folklore Museum (Ανθρωπολογικό και Λαογραφικό Μουσείο), was established in 1997 by the Municipality of Ptolemaida. It was initially housed in a ground-floor shop at 19 Nosokomeiou St. During 2000 it is due to be installed in a new building especially built for this museum. This new building located on 28 Oktovriou St and Agias Triados St corner.

== Exhibits ==
The nucleus of the museum display is the folklore material collected by a teacher named Georgios Kolitsis in 1981 in the area of Eordaia, on behalf of the Ptolemaida's Nature Club. Once the museum had opened, the folklore collection was supplemented with new exhibits, some of which are on display and others in storage in view of the impending move to new premises. The exhibits at present include local costumes from Western Macedonia, household utensils, agricultural implements, ornamental objects, tools of various trades, old coins, needlework, and embroidered and woven fabrics.

The paleontological collection includes tusks, bones and teeth of prehistoric elephants (Palaeoloxodon antiquus), the lower jaw of a hippopotamus, a partial skull of an aurochs (Bos primigenius), antlers of red deer (Cervus elaphus) and moose (Alces latifrons), and gastropods and starfish 70–80,000,000 years old.

The museum has included an art gallery since January 1998. Within the first year, it collected and exhibited 300 works by such well-known Greek painters as Moralis, Mytaras, Pandaleon, Fassianos, Karavouzis, Malamos, Angelou, Tetsis, Botsoglou, Metaxas, Papaspyrou, Haros, Kioussis, and Vakirdzis, as also 50 works (oils, engravings, and pastels) by Pavlos Moskhidis.

== Gallery ==
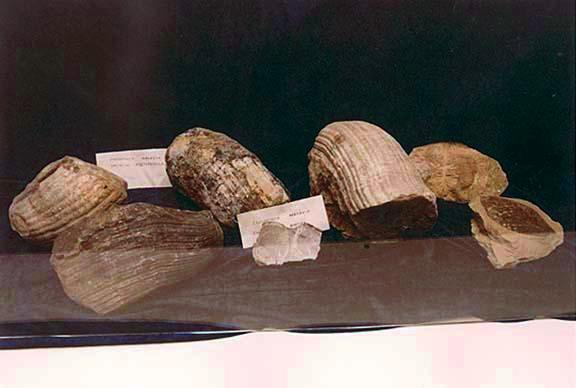
Fossilized shells

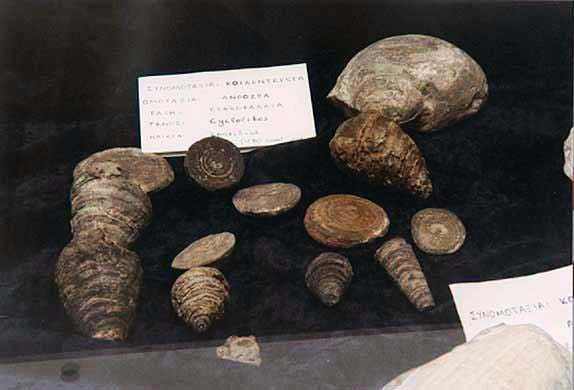
More fossilized shells

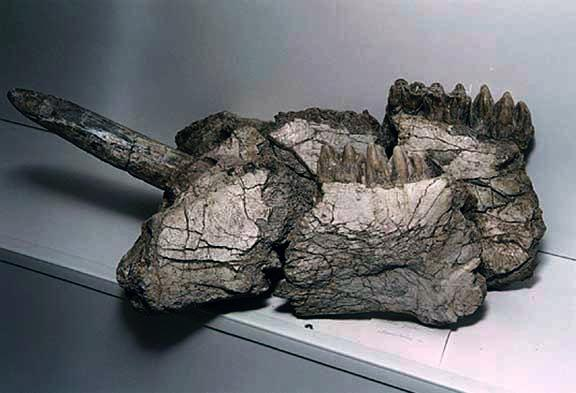
Lower jawbone of hippopotamus

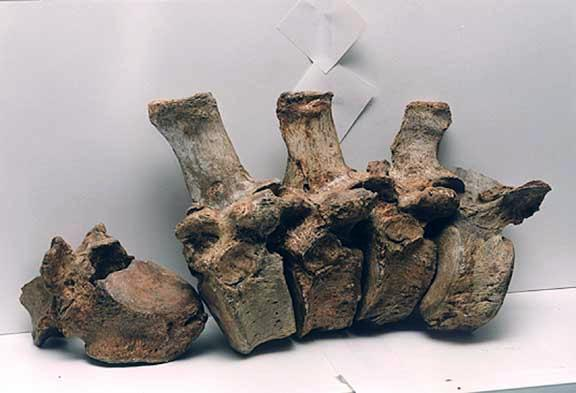
Prehistoric elephant fossils
