= Triantafyllia, Florina =

Village in the municipality of Florina, West Macedonia, Greece

Triantafyllia Τριανταφυλλιά
- Community
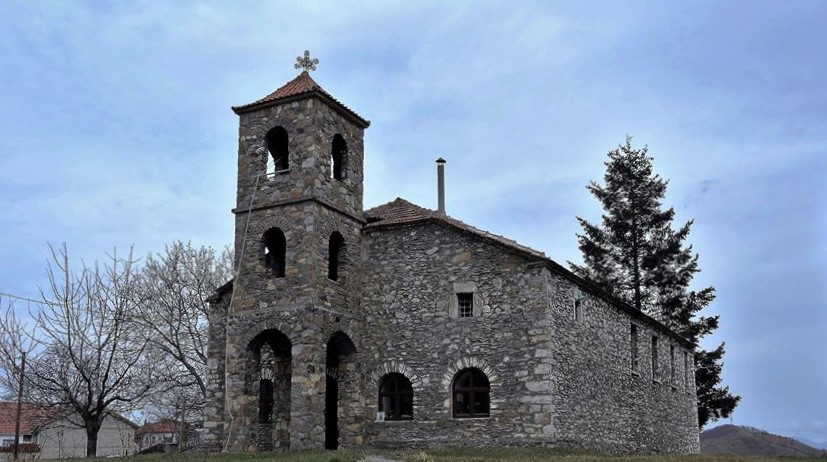
- Church in Triantafyllia

- Location within Greece
- Coordinates: 40°41′56″N 21°23′50″E
- Country: Greece
- Administrative region: Western Macedonia
- Regional unit: Florina
- Municipality: Florina
- Municipal unit: Perasma

Population (2021)
  - Community: 44
- Time zone: UTC+2 (EET)
  - Summer (DST): UTC+3 (EEST)

Triantafyllia (Greek: Τριανταφυλλιά; Bulgarian and Macedonian: Лаген or Лагино) is a village in the municipality of Florina, West Macedonia, Greece. The village is set amongst the mountains of Northern Greece, on the slopes of Mount Vernon. The town has stone architecture.

Pre–war and post–war immigration from Triantafyllia led to the formation of a diaspora and most of the village population lives abroad in the northern suburbs of Melbourne in Australia.

== History ==
According to Ethnographie des vilayets d'Andrinople: de Monastir, et de Salonique, which was published in 1878, the village had 80 houses and a population of 200 males, all recorded as Bulgarians. According to statistics collected by Vasil Kanchov in 1900, the village had a population of 520, all Bulgarians. According to statistics collected by Dimitar Mishev (under the pseudonym "Brancoff") in 1905, the village had a population of 504, all Bulgarian Patriarchists, with one Patriarchist primary school, one teacher and 12 students.

In 1927, the name of the village was changed from Λάγενη (Lágeni) to Τριανταφυλλιά (Triantafylliá).

== Demographic history ==
Historical population
Year	Pop.	±%
1913	742	—
1920	466	−37.2%
1928	492	+5.6%
1940	468	−4.9%
1951	210	−55.1%
1961	188	−10.5%
1971	85	−54.8%
1981	81	−4.7%
1991	101	+24.7%
2001	64	−36.6%
2011	64	+0.0%
2021	44	−31.2%
