= Kampana Square =

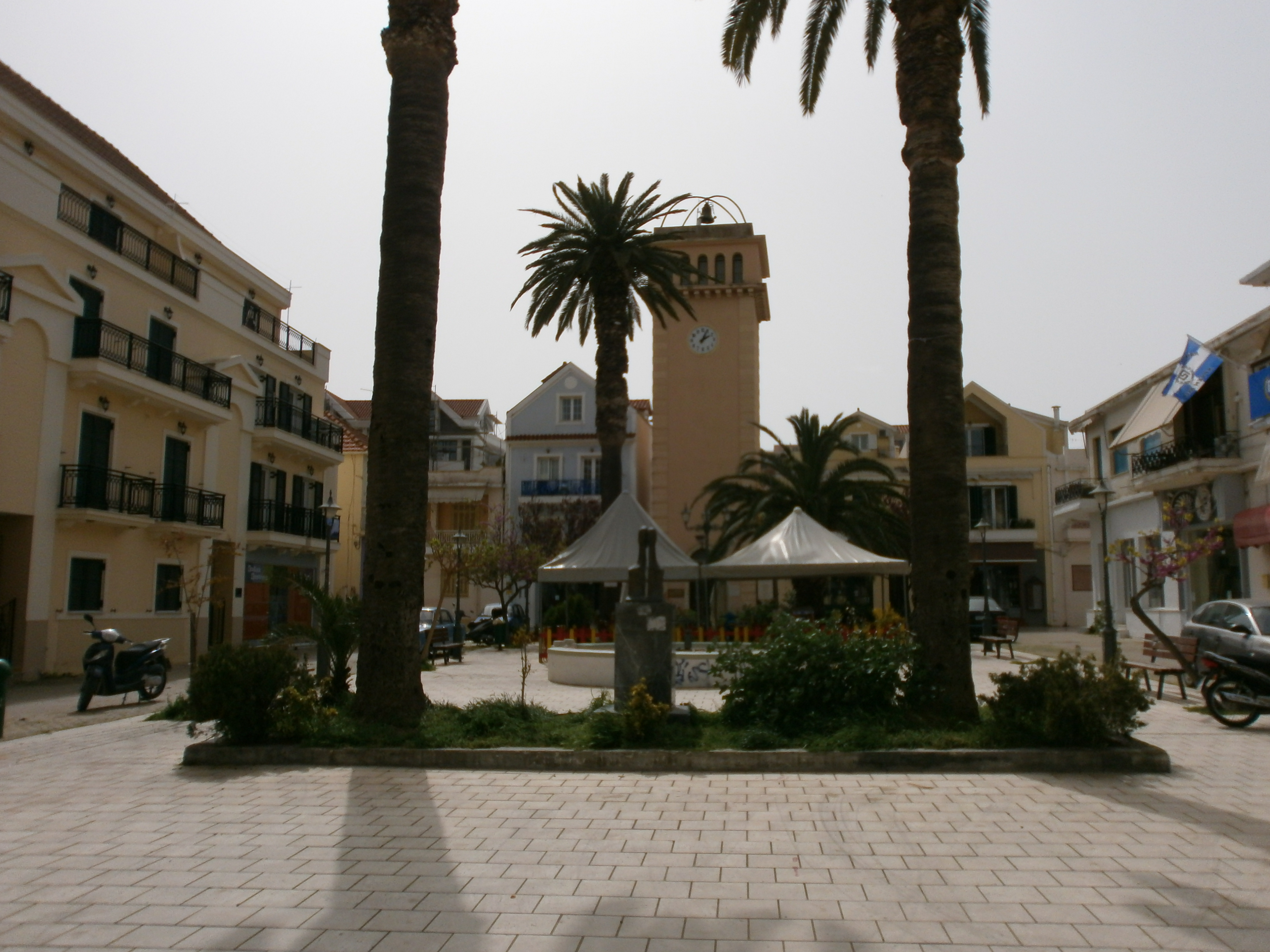
East view of Kampana Square

Kampana Square (Greek: Πλατεία της Καμπάνας, "Bell Square") is a square in the town of Argostoli, Kefalonia in the Ionian Islands prefecture of Greece.

Historians mention that it was built during the reign of the Republic of Venice in the Ionian Islands (1500–1797). The square is located near the end of the town's main commercial street "Lithostroto", which was then called "Kranion Street". The Venetians wanted to name it St. Mark's Square but in the end it became known as "The Bell Square" because of a tower that to this day rises higher than all surrounding buildings and bears a clock and metal structure with a bell suspended from it.

== History ==
The Bell would sound every hour and half hour and also signified the start and end of all important activities in the town at a time when few citizens had their own time-telling devices. It was also used to announce major festivities (i.e. national celebrations and election victories), while it has been recorded that on several occasions the bell cracked from the simultaneous mechanical and manual ringing by enthusiastic locals. The arched entrance of the clock tower was until 1900–1910 decorated with a relief depiction of a handshake: this was the medieval emblem of Kefalonia and was used to decorate all public buildings of the time. Throughout the duration of the British occupation a clock winder had been appointed to tend to the clock's proper operation.

The clock remained in good working condition until the mid 1920s, when it fell into disrepair. On August 12, 1953 the island was struck by the catastrophic Ionian earthquake and the Bell Tower collapsed. The bell was later found buried in the ruins, yet intact. The Tower was rebuilt by donations initiated by a Kefalonian woman, the bell put in place and in 1985 the clock operated for the first time since the earthquake.

== The Kampana Café ==
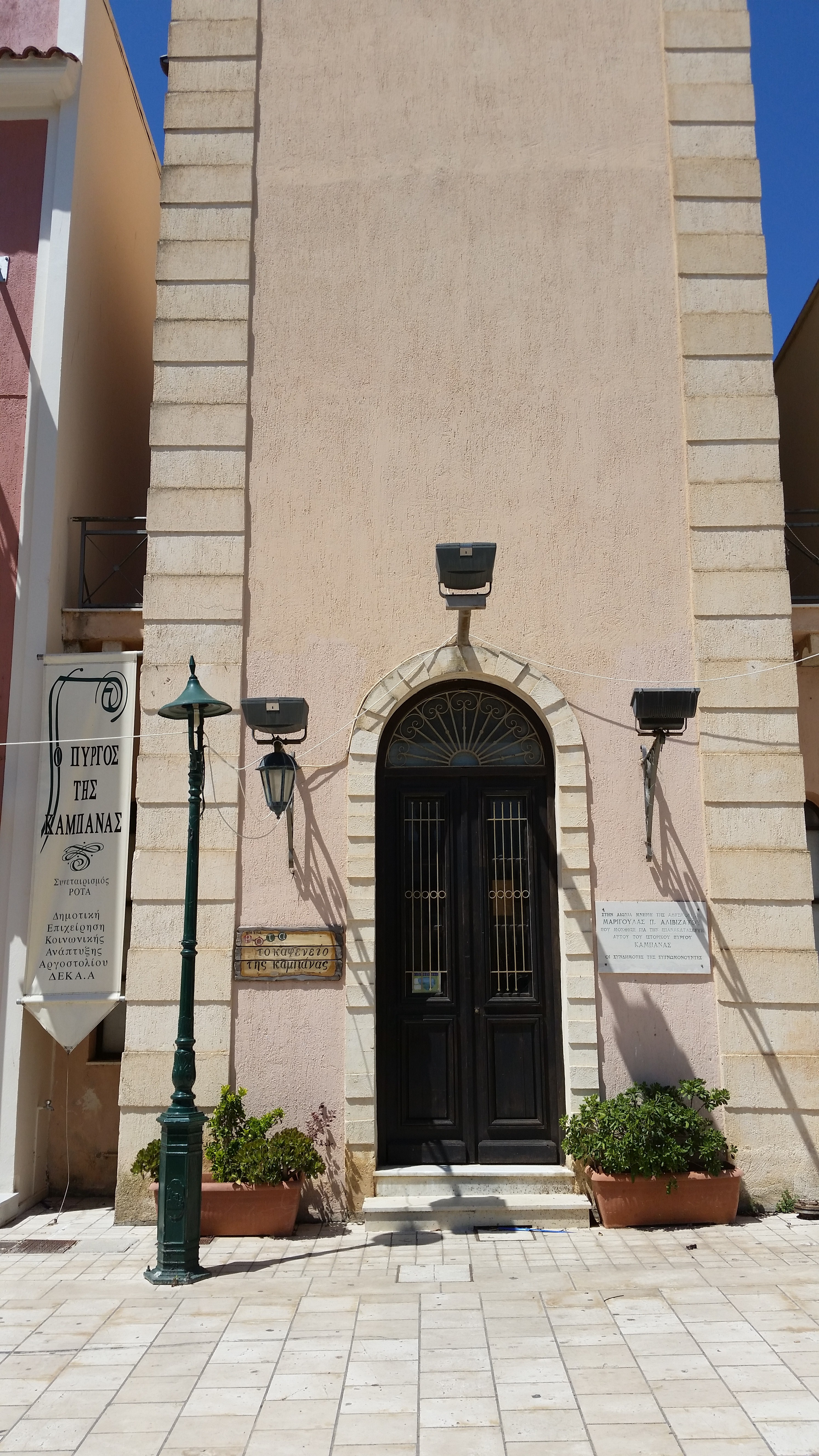
An image of the Kampana (Bell Tower) Cafe entrance in 2016. The Cafe has been shut down since 2013 and the historical building is no longer accessible to the public.

The Kampana Cafe ("Bell Tower Cafe") was established in 2000 by the "KOI.S.P.E. Rota" social enterprise for the purpose of offering employment to unemployed youths and disabled citizens by means of the "PEIRAN" programme and the EU Initiative "Employment Horizon" for the Region of the Ionian Islands. The cafe was accommodated on the ground floor of the Bell Tower. It operated as a traditional cafe with local refreshments and sweets, while the traditional products prepared by the cafe's employees were also sold on the premises. The cafe also served as an entry point for visitors to the historical building and the clock at the top of the Tower.

In May 2013 the Municipality of Kefalonia decided to cease operation of the cafe on the pretext that the social enterprise was no longer viable due to accumulated debt. The issue was in the headlines of the local media for weeks afterward, while a petition was filed with the European Parliament against the Municipality of Kefalonia for failing to cater to the needs of disabled persons on the island. The Cafe remains closed and the Bell Tower is no longer accessible to visitors.
