= Zacharias Papadas =

Greek soldier

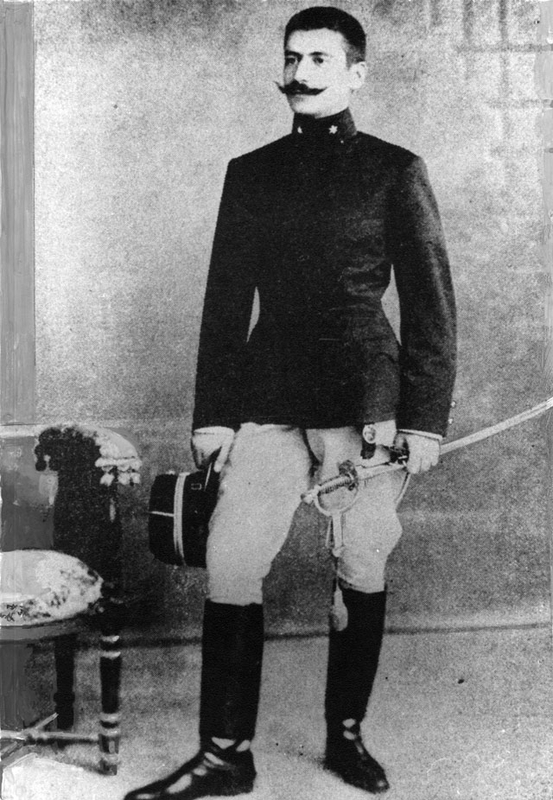

Zacharias Papadas (Ζαχαρίας Παπαδάς, 1876 - 8 May 1907) was a Greek soldier who was part of the Macedonian Struggle. He was born in the village of Platanaki in Arkadia and was nicknamed Captain Foufas (καπετάν Φούφας). The village Foufas was named after him.
