= Verno =

Mountain in West Macedonia, Greece

- Βέρνο
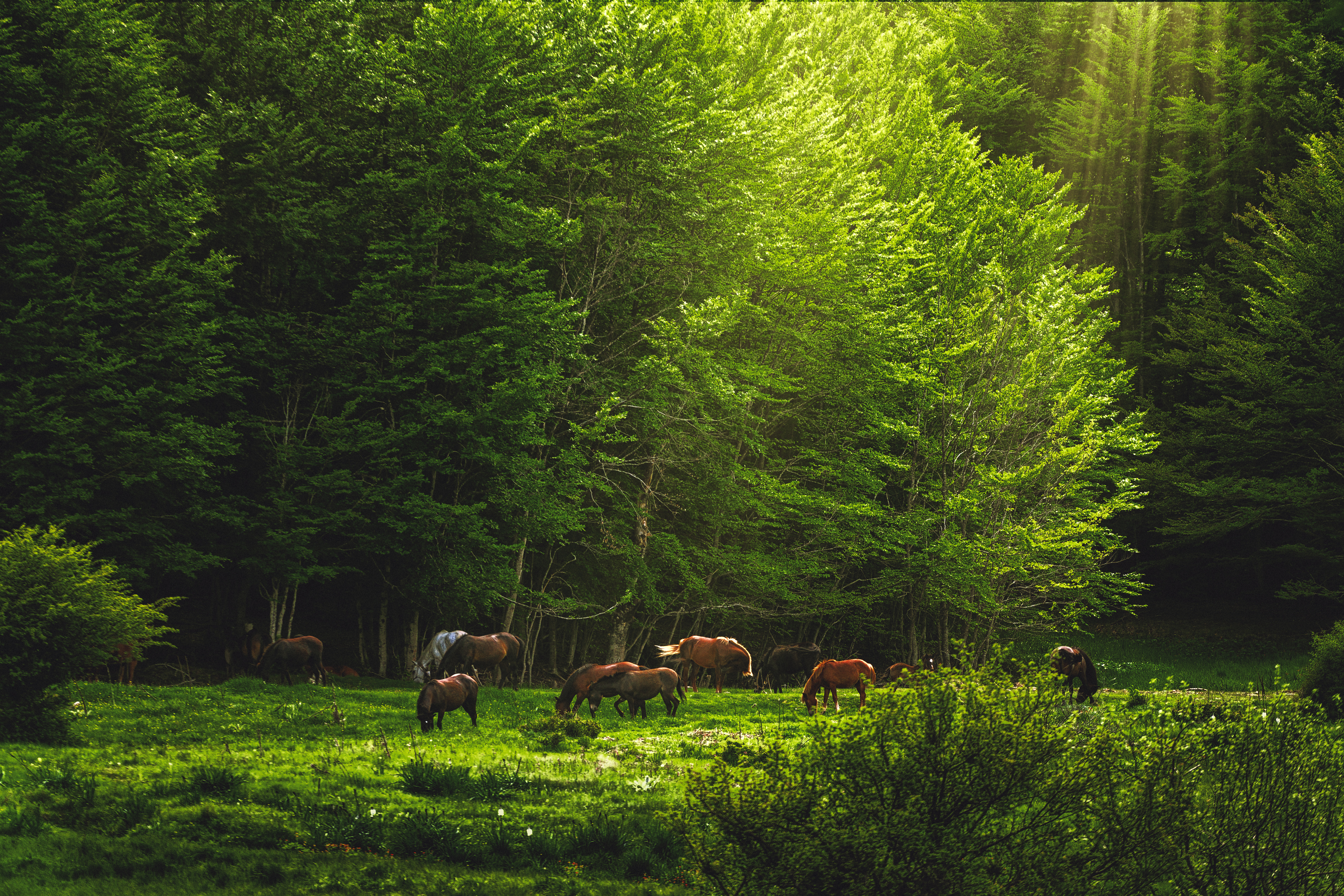

Highest point
- Elevation: 2,128 m (6,982 ft)
- Listing: List of mountains in Greece
- Coordinates: 40°38′57″N 21°23′8″E

Naming
- Pronunciation: Greek: [ˈverno]

Geography
- Location within Greece
- Location: Greece Western Macedonia

Verno (Greek: Βέρνο), Vitsi (Greek: Βίτσι) or Vicho (Macedonian: Вичо) is a forested mountain range in the southern part of the Florina and the northeastern part of the Kastoria regional units in Western Macedonia, northern Greece. The elevation of its highest peak is 2,128 m (6,982 ft). It stretches from the village Trivouno in the northwest to Kleisoura in the southeast, over a length of about 30 km (19 mi). The nearest mountains are the Askio to the southeast, the Baba to the north and the northern Pindus to the southwest. It is drained towards the river Sakoulevas (a tributary of the Crna) to the northeast, and towards the Aliakmonas and Lake Kastoria to the southwest.

The nearest towns are Kastoria to the southwest and Florina to the northeast. Mountain villages in the Verno mountains include Trivouno, Polypotamo and Triantafyllia in the north, Makrochori, Vyssinia and Vasileiada in the south and Nymfaio in the east. The Greek National Road 2 (Krystallopigi - Florina - Edessa - Thessaloniki) runs north of the mountains. There is a road to the top of the mountain Vitsi.

== See also ==
- List of mountains in Greece
