= Skiti, Kozani =

Skiti Σκήτη
- Community
- Location within Greece
- Coordinates: 40°18′36″N 21°39′04″E
- Country: Greece
- Administrative region: Western Macedonia
- Regional unit: Kozani
- Municipality: Kozani
- Municipal unit: Kozani

Population (2021)
  - Community: 230
- Time zone: UTC+2 (EET)
  - Summer (DST): UTC+3 (EEST)

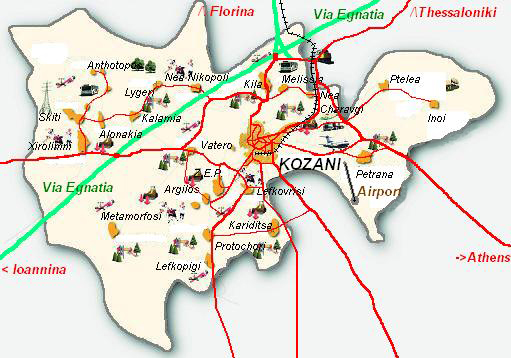
Location in Kozani

Skiti (Greek: Σκήτη) is a community located in the far west of the city of Kozani in northern Greece. It has a population of 230 (2021).
