= Ptolemaida =

Town in Western Macedonia, Greece

Ptolemaida Πτολεμαΐδα
- Municipal unit
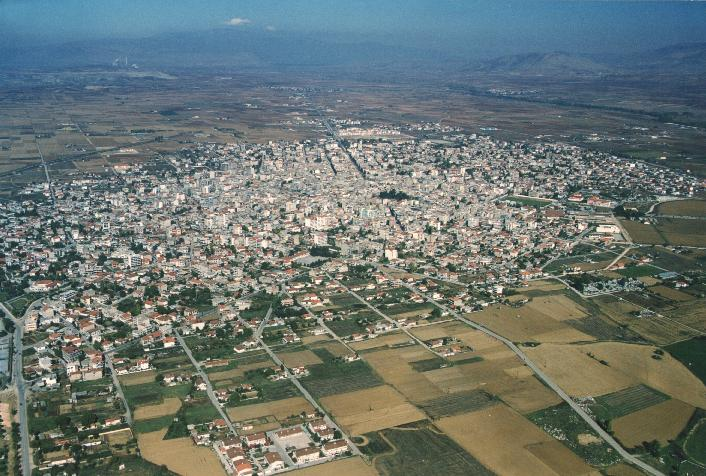
- Aerial view of Ptolemaida

- Seal

- Location within the regional unit

- Location within Greece
- Coordinates: 40°31′N 21°41′E
- Country: Greece
- Geographic region: Macedonia
- Administrative region: Western Macedonia
- Regional unit: Kozani
- Municipality: Eordaia

Area
  - Municipal unit: 217.901 km^{2} (84.132 sq mi)
  - Community: 57.508 km^{2} (22.204 sq mi)
- Elevation: 600 m (2,000 ft)

Population (2021)
  - Municipal unit: 35,334
  - Municipal unit density: 162.16/km^{2} (419.98/sq mi)
  - Community: 31,575
  - Community density: 549.05/km^{2} (1,422.0/sq mi)
- Time zone: UTC+2 (EET)
  - Summer (DST): UTC+3 (EEST)
- Postal code: 502 00
- Area code: 24630
- Vehicle registration: KZ
- Website: www.ptolemaida.gr

Ptolemaida (Greek: Πτολεμαΐδα, romanized: Ptolemaïda, Katharevousa: Πτολεμαΐς, Ptolemaïs) is a town and a former municipality in the Kozani regional unit of Western Macedonia, Greece. Since the 2011 local government reform, it is part of the municipality of Eordaia, of which it is the seat and a municipal unit. It is known for its coal (lignite) mines and its power stations.

== Name ==
During the Ottoman period the city was called Kayılar (English: Kailar, German: Kajilar), rendered into English as Kaïlar. This name was retained in Greek as Kailaria (Καϊλάρια) until 1927. Kayılar refers to the Kayı tribe, the tribe of Osman I, the founder of the Ottoman Empire. The modern name Ptolemaida was introduced by decree on January 20, 1927, honoring Ptolemy I Soter, son of Lagus, comrade-in-arms of Alexander the Great and founder of the Ptolemaic dynasty, and his daughter Ptolemaïs, who are said to originate from that region. His statue stands in the central square of the city.

== History ==
According to archaeologists, the Ptolemaida region has been occupied since 6000 BC.

=== Neolithic period ===
Archaeologists, in November 2005, discovered the remains of two farming villages dating back to the Neolithic period. A press report notes that such farming villages were trading centres and had a "developed knowledge of metalworking".

A golden necklace dating to roughly 4500 BC was discovered on February 16, 2006. Associated Press reporter Costas Kantouris describes the item as a "flat, roughly ring-shaped [which] probably had religious significance and would have been worn on a necklace by a prominent member of society."

Lately in the lake Zazari near Ptolemaida there were found 16 houses that belong in the Neolithic era due to archaeologists. These houses were in the lake and were exposed because of the decreased water level of the lake. That particular small settlement gives information about the society and the people in the Neolithic era.

=== Archaic period ===
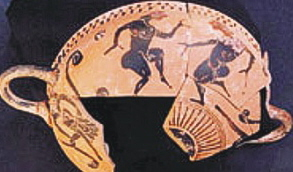
Ancient ceramic plate from Ptolemaida

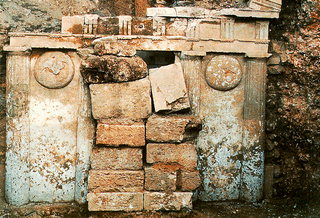
Ancient Macedonian grave in Ptolemaida

In the area of Ptolemaida many archeological findings have occurred in the last 30 years due to mining operations. Ceramic artifacts, dating to the 6th century BC have been found at two sites near Grevena and Ptolemaida. Archaeologists found the artifacts at two prehistoric farming settlements. Two Ancient Macedonian graves have also been found in the area of Ptolemaida, dated from the 5th century BC.

=== Macedonian Period ===
In 336 BCE the area around Ptolemaida came under the control of expanding Kingdom of Macedon under Philip II. The Land of the Chords and the whole region of Eordea was fully incorporated into Macedon under Philip II and later his successor Alexander. Two of the six generals of Alexander the Great, Ptolemy I Soter,and Aristones are claimed to hail from Eordaia. Ptolemy became the founder of the Ptolemaic Kingdom.

=== Hellenistic period ===
With the death of Alexander, his empire was divided and Macedon came under the control of Antigonus I. Macedon remained an important and powerful kingdom during both Wars of the Diadochi and later the Punic Wars with Rome.Macedon remained a force to be reckoned with until the Battle of Pydna (22 June 168 BC), in which the Roman general Aemilius Paulus defeated King Perseus of Macedon, ending the reign of the Antigonid dynasty over Macedonia.

=== Roman period ===
Much historical information exists for the period of Roman times when referring to the region of Ptolemais and Eordaia. The Roman Egnatia highway, which was detached from the main artery after leaving the Straits of the Key, led to present-day Kozani and then, through the Sarantaporos Strait, to Thessaly. In 395, Ptolemaida and all of Macedonia became part of the Eastern Roman Empire.

=== Byzantine period ===
At various times, Ptolemaida was part of the First Bulgarian Empire, Latin Empire, the Kingdom of Thessalonica, Second Bulgarian Empire, the Empire of Nicaea, the Despotate of Epirus and Serbian Empire.

=== Ottoman period ===
During the Ottoman period, Ptolemaida was called Kayılar, and it had two parts: Aşağı Kayılar and Yukarı Kayılar. Aşağı Kayılar was Bektaşi and Yukarı Kayılar was Rufai, Hanefi.

Before 1360, large numbers of nomad shepherds, or Yörüks, from the district of Konya, in Asia Minor, had settled in Macedonia. Further immigration from this region took place from time to time up to the middle of the 18th century. After the establishment of the feudal system in 1397, many of the Seljuk noble families came over from Asia Minor; their descendants may be recognized among the Beys or Muslim landowners around Kayılar. At the beginning of the 18th century, the Turkish population was quite considerable, but since that time until at least the early 20th century it continuously decreased. A low birth rate, the exhaustion of the male population by military service, and a large mortality from epidemics brought about a decline which has lately been hastened by emigration. The Turkish rural population around Kayılar was mainly composed of shepherds. In the late 19th and early 20th century, Ptolemaida was part of the Manastir Vilayet of the Ottoman Empire.

=== Modern period ===
Ptolemaida was liberated by the Greek forces on 15 October 1912 during the First Balkan War, and later incorporated into Greece. In 1924, the local Turkish population was exchanged with Greeks from Anatolia and East Thrace following the population exchange between Greece and Turkey. Most of these Greeks came from the former Greek towns of Tiroloi (Τυρολόη, today Çorlu) and Prousa (Προύσα, today Bursa). Since then, Ptolemaida became a majority Greek city once again.

In the 1970s, Greece's largest coal-fired power plants were built in the region of Ptolemaida, these increased pollution and it is expected these will be shut down by the year 2028.

== Culture ==
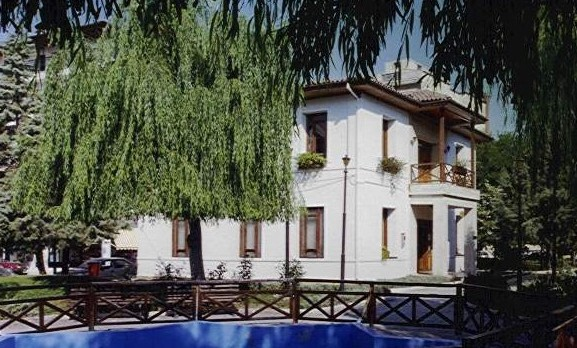
The municipal library

Ptolemaida's football club is called "Eordaikos" (Greek: Εορδαϊκός). Other teams include AE Ptolemaidas. Ptolemaida has schools, lyceums, gymnasia, churches, banks, a post office, a train station (Kozani - Florina), a police station, a water tower, and squares (plateia). There is the potential of a university being established by the state in the near future. The Anthropological and Folklore Museum is based in the town.

== Economy ==
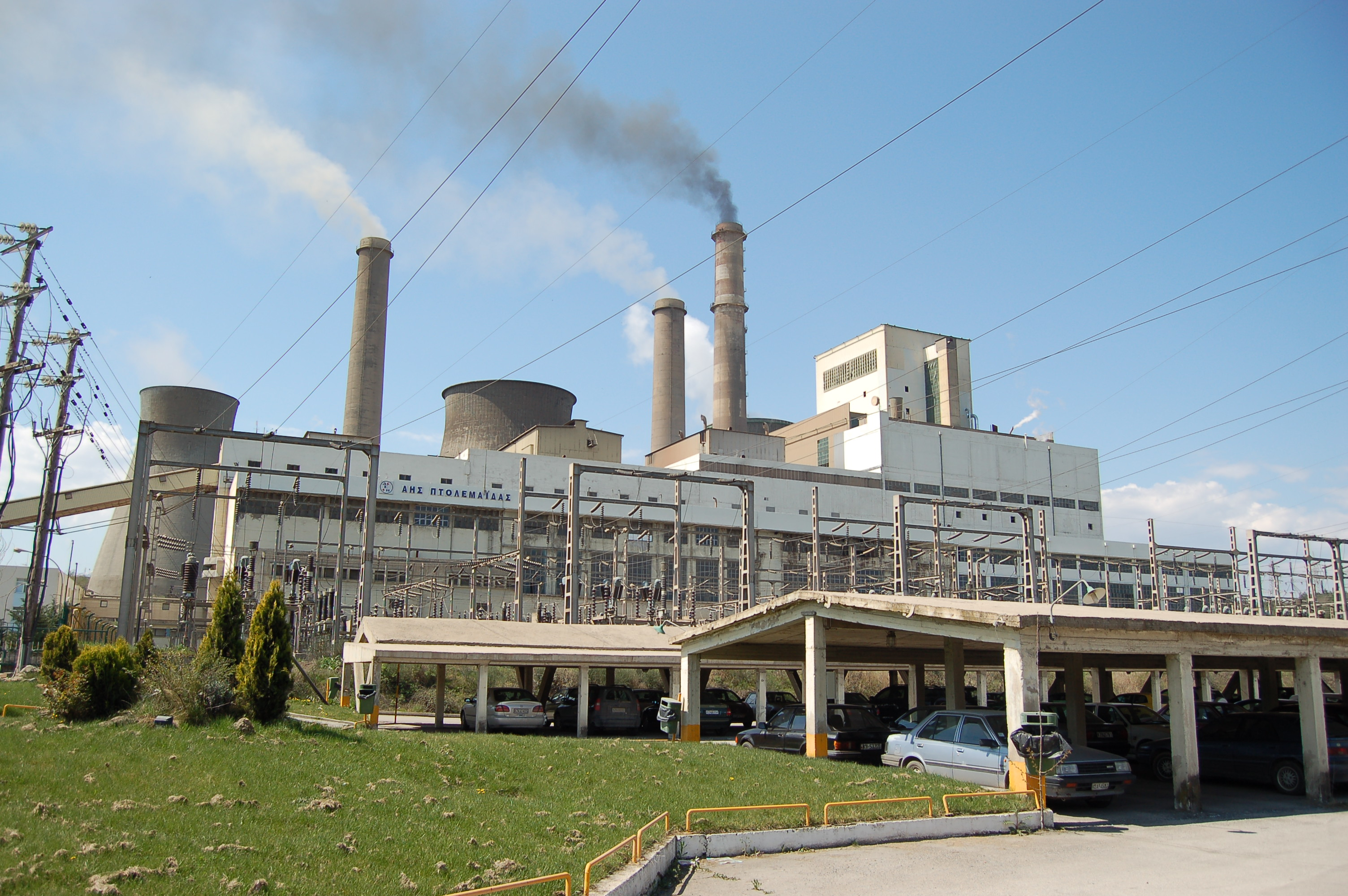
Electric power plant of Ptolemaida

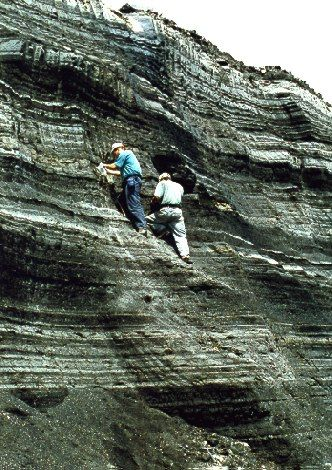
Ptolemaida-Florina coal mine

The largest lignite deposits in Greece are located in the north of the country at Ptolemais-Amynteon and Florina (approximately 1.5 billion tonnes) which contribute around 80% of national production. Other than its lignite reserves, Ptolemaida is a highly industrialized area. The last coal-fired power plant in Greece is here, Ptolemaida 5 using the large local deposits of lignite as fuel. The plant is owned by the Public Power Corporation (DEI), the major employer in the city. The plant was inaugurated by the Prime minister of Greece at that time, Constantine Karamanlis. The other two are in Amyntaio in Florina regional unit and in Agios Dimitrios.

== Education ==
The School of Health Sciences of University of Western Macedonia with two departments (Occupational Therapy and Midwifery) based in the city.

== Climate ==
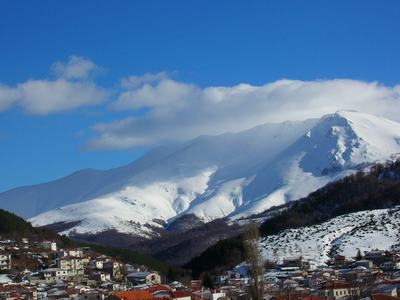
Askio mountain near the city

The city, situated in the middle of the Eordaia plain of Western Macedonia, has a humid subtropical climate (Cfa) with continental (Dfa) influences. Summers can be hot with thunderstorms in unsettled spells, whereas winters are among the coldest in Greece. It was here that the absolute low temperature record of Greece was recorded (−27.8 °C (−18 °F) on 27 January 1963).

== Demographics ==
According to the 1911 edition of the Encyclopædia Britannica, the first settlers of the city were Turks following the conquest of Macedonia by the Ottoman Empire. The Turks remained the majority until the population exchange of 1924. Between 1924 and 1926, Greeks escaping from Anatolia settled here and became the majority.

The current municipal unit of Ptolemaida is constituted by the city of Ptolemaida and 11 small communities. At the 2021 census, the population of the city was 31,575 residents. The total population of the municipality Eordaia in 2021 was 42,515 residents.

Year	Community	Municipal unit
1940	7,719	-
1951	8,816	-
1961	12,747	-
1971	16,588	-
1981	22,109	-
1991	25,125	32,775
2001	30,017	36,393
2011	32,142	37,289
2021	31,575	35,334

== Geography ==
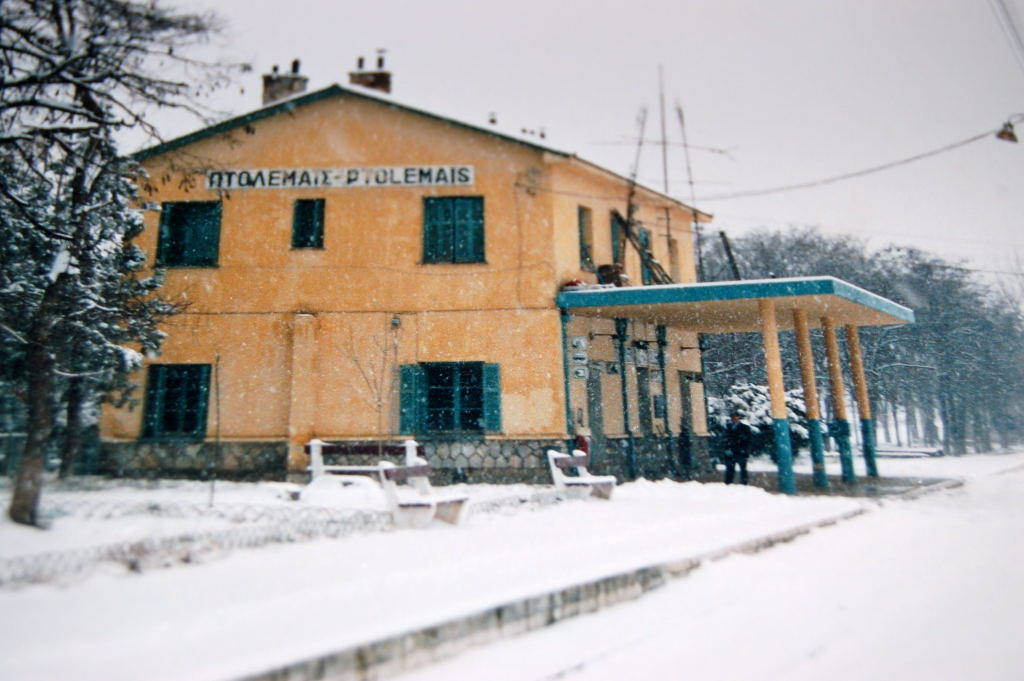
Train station

The city lies in the valley of Eordaia, between the Askio mountains to the southwest and the Vermio mountains Turkish: Karlıdağ to the northeast. It is located north of Kozani, east of Kastoria, south of Florina, and south-west of Edessa. The municipal unit has an area of 217.901 km^{2}, the community (the city proper) has an area of 57.508 km^{2}. The A27 motorway (Kozani-Florina, part of E65) passes east of the city. Ptolemaida was the seat of the former province of Eordaia.

== Friendship towns ==
Ptolemaida is twinned with:

- Enkomi, Cyprus

== People ==
- Pantelis Kapetanos, football player
- Ieroklis Michailidis, actor
- Stiliani Papadopoulou, hammer thrower
- Iordanis Konstantinidis, Greco-Roman wrestler
- Mazlum Kayalar, Turkish Politician
- Yıldız Eruçman, Yıldız Kayalar Eruçman (born 1919) was the first Turkish female parachutist.

== See also ==
- Battle of Ptolemaida
- List of settlements in the Kozani regional unit
