= Mouriki =

Mouriki Μουρίκι
- Municipal unit
- Location within the regional unit

- Location within Greece
- Coordinates: 40°29′N 21°34′E
- Country: Greece
- Administrative region: West Macedonia
- Regional unit: Kozani
- Municipality: Eordaia

Area
  - Municipal unit: 112.06 km^{2} (43.27 sq mi)
- Elevation: 678 m (2,224 ft)

Population (2021)
  - Municipal unit: 3,416
  - Municipal unit density: 30.48/km^{2} (78.95/sq mi)
- Time zone: UTC+2 (EET)
  - Summer (DST): UTC+3 (EEST)
- Vehicle registration: KZ

Mouriki (Greek: Μουρίκι) is a former municipality in Kozani regional unit, West Macedonia, Greece. Since the 2011 local government reform it is part of the municipality Eordaia, of which it is a municipal unit. The municipal unit has an area of 112.058 km^{2}. The population in 2021 was 3,416. The seat of the municipality was in Emporio.
