= Neraida, Kozani =

Village located along the river Aliakmon in Servia municipality in Greece

Neraida Νεράιδα
- Community
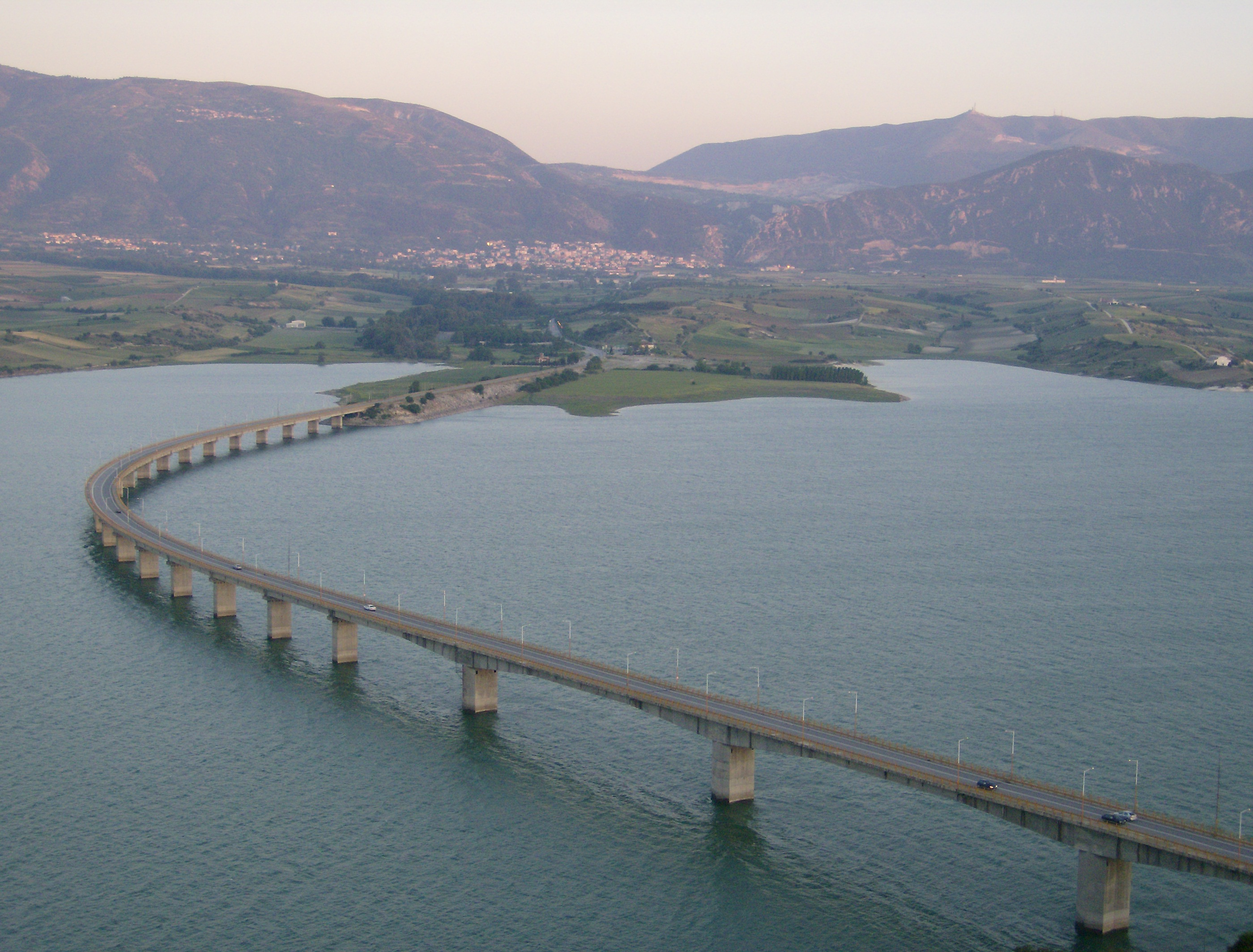
- The bridge (1352 m.) over Lake Polyfyto

- Location within Greece
- Coordinates: 40°14′29″N 21°57′42″E
- Country: Greece
- Administrative region: West Macedonia
- Regional unit: Kozani
- Municipality: Servia
- Municipal unit: Servia
- Elevation: 280 m (920 ft)

Population (2021)
  - Community: 127
- Time zone: UTC+2 (EET)
  - Summer (DST): UTC+3 (EEST)
- Postal code: 50100
- Area code: 24640
- Vehicle registration: KZ

Neraida (Greek: Νεράιδα) is a village located at the north shore of Lake Polyfyto (a reservoir on the river Aliakmon) in Servia municipality, Kozani regional unit, in the Greek region of Macedonia. It is situated at an altitude of 280 meters. At the 2021 census the population was 127. The regional capital, Kozani, is 20 km away.
