= Neraida =

Neraida may refer to several places in Greece:

- Neraida, Phthiotis, in the municipality of Stylida, Phthiotis regional unit, Central Greece
- Neraida, Kozani, in the Kozani regional unit, Macedonia
- Neraida, Karditsa, in the former municipality of Itamos, Karditsa regional unit, Thessaly
- Neraida, Larissa, in the former municipality of Polydamantas, Larissa regional unit, Thessaly
- Neraida, Trikala, in the Trikala regional unit, Thessaly
- Neraida, Elis, in the former municipality of Foloi, Elis regional unit, Western Greece
