= Rodochori =

Village in the Greek region of Macedonia

Rodochori Ροδοχώρι
- Community
- Location within Greece
- Coordinates: 40°12′32.31″N 21°17′34.57″E
- Country: Greece
- Administrative region: Western Macedonia
- Regional unit: Kozani
- Municipality: Voio
- Municipal unit: Tsotyli

Population (2021)
  - Community: 27
- Time zone: UTC+2 (EET)
  - Summer (DST): UTC+3 (EEST)
- Postal code: 50002
- Area code: +30 2468

Rodochori (Greek: Ροδοχώρι, before 1928: Ραδοβίτσι – Radovitsi), is a village located in the Voio municipality, situated in Kozani regional unit, in the Greek region of Macedonia. The village of Krimini is nearby.

Rodochori's elevation is 730 meters. At the 2021 census, the population was 27.
