= Geography of Greece =

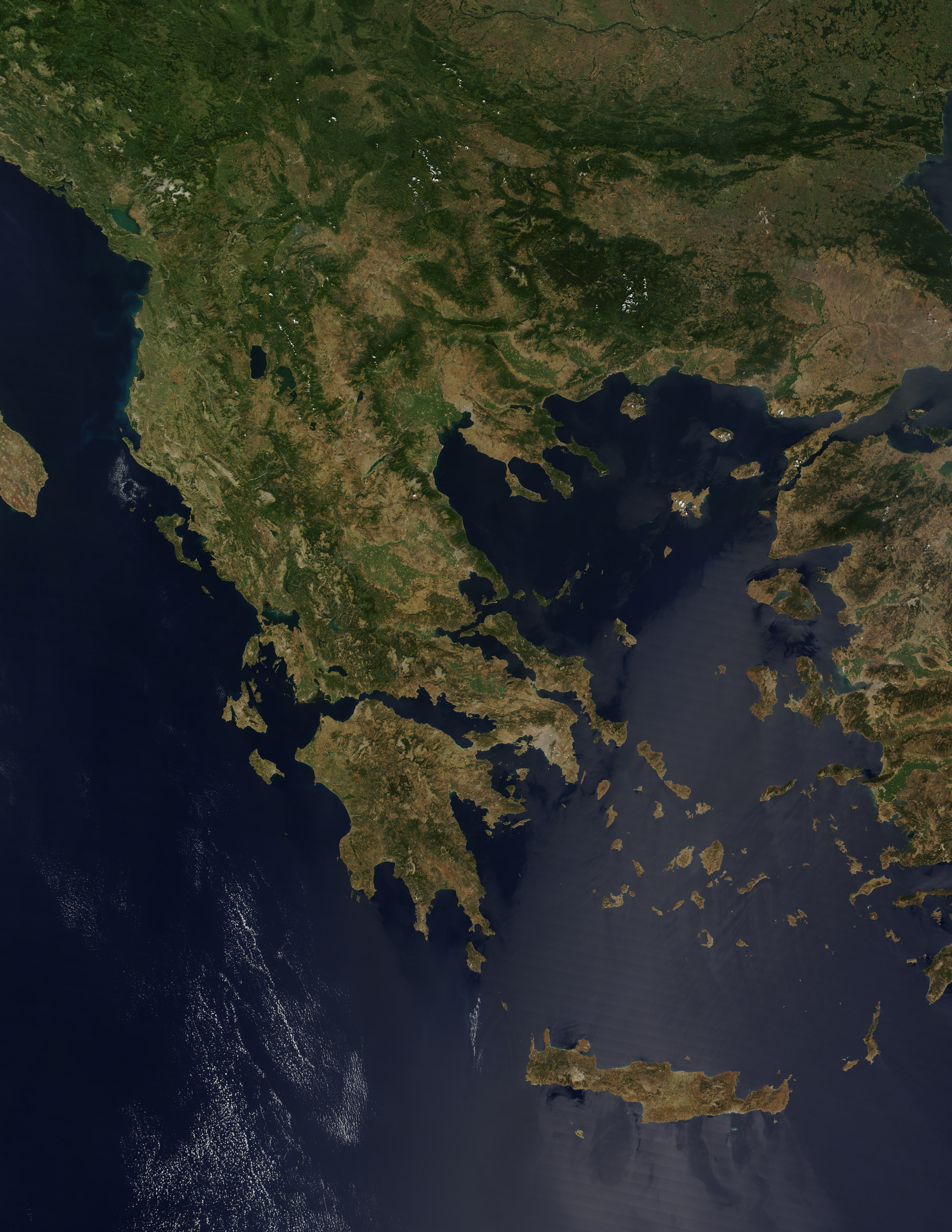
- Continent: Europe
- Region: Southern Europe
- Coordinates: 40°00′N 21°00′E
- Area: Ranked 95th
  - Total: 131,957 km^{2} (50,949 sq mi)
  - Land: 99.13%
  - Water: 0.87%
- Coastline: 13,676 km (8,498 mi)
- Borders: 689.76 km (428.60 mi)
- Highest point: Mount Olympus; 2,918 metres (9,573 ft)
- Lowest point: Epitalio −6 metres (−20 ft)
- Longest river: Haliacmon; 297 kilometres (185 mi)
- Largest lake: Lake Trichonida; 98.6 km^{2} (38.07 sq mi)
- Terrain: 80% mountainous, plains (east and north-east)
- Natural resources: petroleum, magnetite, lignite, bauxite, hydropower, marble, limestone, fish
- Natural hazards: earthquakes, floods, droughts and wildfires
- Environmental issues: air pollution, water pollution

Greece is a country located mostly on the Balkan Peninsula of Southeastern Europe, with thousands of islands stretching to the Anatolian continental shelf of West Asia. It is bordered to the north by Albania, North Macedonia and Bulgaria; to the east by Turkey, and is surrounded to the east by the Aegean Sea, to the south by the Cretan and the Libyan seas, and to the west by the Ionian Sea which separates Greece from Italy.

The country consists of a mostly mountainous, peninsular mainland jutting out into the Mediterranean Sea at the southernmost tip of the Balkan Peninsula, and a large number of islands, the largest being Crete, Euboea, Lesvos, Rhodes, Chios, Kefalonia, and Corfu; groups of smaller islands include the Dodecanese and the Cyclades. Smaller peninsulas projecting from the mainland include the Chalkidiki and the Peloponnese, which is joined to the mainland by the Isthmus of Corinth.

Greece's latitude ranges from 35°N to 42°N and its longitude from 19°E to 28°E. As a result of this and its physical geography, the country has considerable climatic variation.

== Physical geography ==
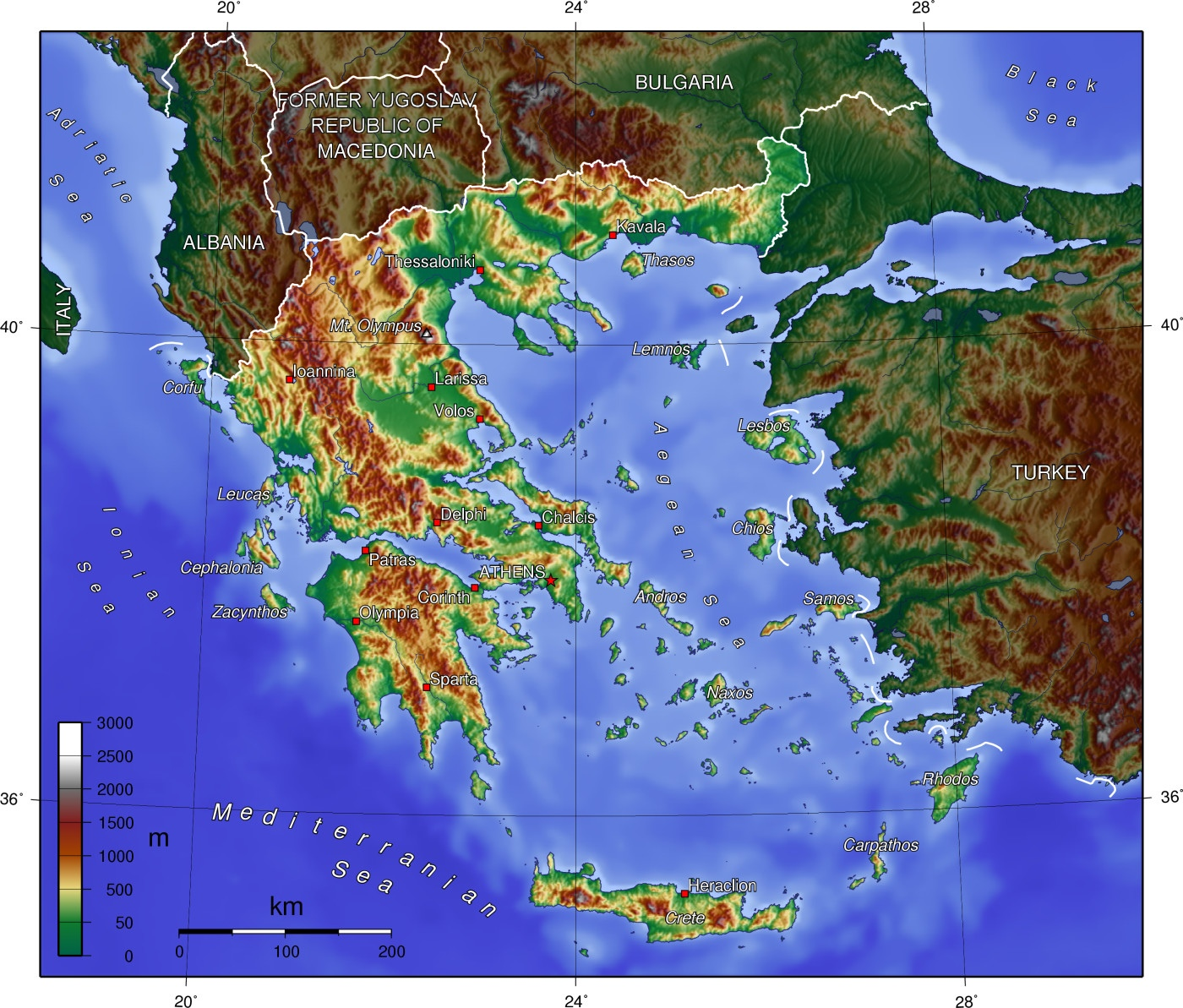
Topographic map of Greece

Greece is located mostly in Southeastern Europe with islands adjacent to West Asia, bordering the Ionian Sea and the Mediterranean Sea. It is a peninsular country, with an archipelago of about 3,000 islands.

It has a total area of 131,957 km^{2} (50,949 sq mi), of which land area is 130,647 km^{2} and internal waters (lakes and rivers) account for 1,310 km^{2}. Land boundaries with Albania (212 km), North Macedonia (234 km), Bulgaria (472 km) and Turkey (192 km) measure approximately 1,110 km in total. Of the country's total territory, 83.33% or 110,496 km^{2} (42,663 sq mi) is mainland territory and the rest 16.67% or 21,461 km^{2} (8,286 sq mi) is island territory.

Greece's proclaimed Exclusive Economic Zone (EEZ) has a total size of 505,572 km² (195,202 mi²). Greece's EEZ is bordered by those of Albania and Italy to the west, Libya and Egypt to the south, and Cyprus and Turkey to the east.

80% of Greece is mountainous. The Pindus mountain range lies across the center of the country in a northwest-to-southeast direction, with a maximum elevation of 2,637 m. Extensions of the same mountain range stretch across the Peloponnese and underwater across the Aegean, forming many of the Aegean Islands including Crete, and joining with the Taurus Mountains of southern Turkey. Central and western Greece contain high and steep peaks intersected by many canyons and other karstic landscapes, including the Meteora and the Vikos Gorges. The Vikos Gorge plunges vertically for more than 1,100 metres, making it the world's deepest canyon in proportion to its width, and the third deepest after the Copper Canyon in Mexico and the Grand Canyon in the United States.

Mount Olympus is the highest point in Greece, the 7th highest and the 9th most prominent mountain in mainland Europe (together with Gerlachovský štít and including Großglockner as a separate mountain), rising to 2,917 m above sea level. The Rhodope Mountains form the border between Greece and Bulgaria; that area is covered with vast and thick forests.

Plains are found in eastern Thessaly (the Thessalian Plain), in central Macedonia (the Thessaloniki-Giannitsa Plain) and in Thrace.

=== Elevation extremes ===
- Highest point: Mount Olympus: 2,917 m (9,570 ft)
- Lowest point: Epitalio: −6 m (−20 ft)

=== Extremities of Greece ===
The extreme points of Greece are

- North: Ormenio village (42°00′41″ N, 26°13′15″ E)
- South: Gavdos island (35°48′11″ N, 24°07′25″ E)
- East: Strongyli island (36°06′17″ N, 29°38′39″ E)
- West: Othonoi island (40°51′11″ N, 19°22′41″ E)

=== Natural resources ===
Greece has notable deposits of petroleum, magnetite, lignite, bauxite, hydropower, marble, limestone Ancient Greeks used limestone as a durable building material in many buildings such as the Parthenon. Greece has substantial marine life with plentiful fish in its EEZ.

=== Land use ===
- Arable land: 19.71%
- Permanent crops: 8.95%
- Other: 71.37% (2012 est.)

Irrigated land: 15,550 km^{2} (2007)

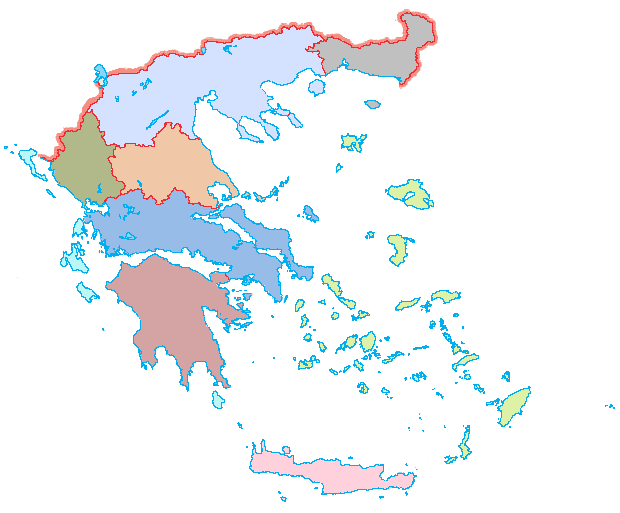
- Regions of Greece

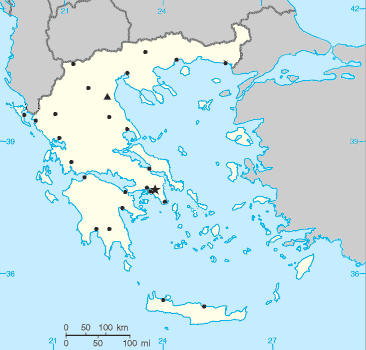
- Map of Greece
- Cities and islands of Greece

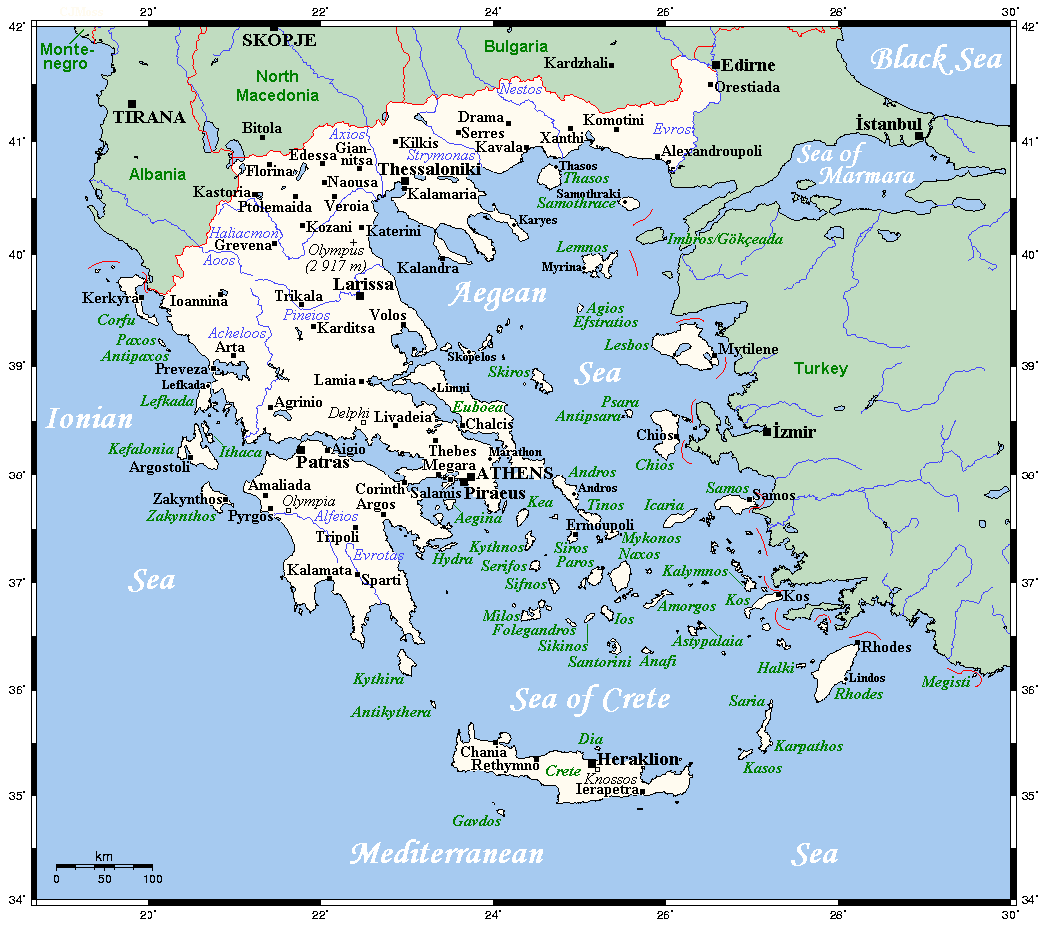
Greece's cities, main towns, main rivers, islands and selected archaeological sites.

=== Mainland ===
Mainland Greece forms the southernmost part of the Balkan Peninsula with two additional smaller peninsulas projecting from it: the Chalkidiki and the Peloponnese. The north of the country includes the regions of Macedonia and Thrace. To the south the mainland narrows and includes the regions of Epirus, Thessaly and Central Greece, where the region of Attica and the capital city Athens are located. Further south, the smaller peninsula of Peloponnese is separated from the rest of the Greek mainland by the Corinthian and Saronic Gulfs, but joined by the Isthmus of Corinth.

Mainland Greece covers about 80% of the total territory and is largely mountainous. The largest mountain range of Greece is the Pindus range, the southern extension of the Dinaric Alps, which forms the spine of the Greek mainland, separating Epirus from Thessaly and Macedonia. The country's tallest mountain is Mount Olympus, which also separates Thessaly from Macedonia. Its highest peak rises to 2,918 m above sea level, making it the second highest of the Balkan peninsula after Musala in the Rila Mountain.

The number of islands vary between 1,200 and 6,000. A figure frequently cited in travel guides is 1,425 islands, of which 166 are said to be inhabited. The Greek Tourism Organization reports a figure of 6,000, with 227 of them inhabited. Paris Match, however, raises this number to 9,841 islands, of which only 169 have a recorded continuous human presence.

The Greek islands account for about 20% of the country's total territory, and vary greatly in size as well as in climate. The country's largest island is Crete, with Euboea being second largest. Other large Greek islands include Rhodes and Lesbos in the Aegean Sea, and Corfu and Cephalonia in the Ionian Sea. Many of the smaller Greek islands form groups or chains, often called archipelagos, with notable examples being the Cyclades and the Sporades in the south and central Aegean Sea respectively.

==== Aegean ====
The islands of the Aegean Sea are situated between mainland Greece to the west and north, Anatolia to the east and the island of Crete to the south. Traditionally, the islands are classified into seven groups, from north to south:

- North Aegean islands
- Sporades
- Euboea
- Saronic Islands
- Cyclades
- Dodecanese (Southern Sporades)
- Crete

==== Ionian Islands ====
The Ionian Islands are a group of seven islands. The six northern islands lie off the western coast of Greece, in the Ionian Sea. The other island, Kythira, lies off the southern tip of the Peloponnese. Kythira is part of the modern administrative region of Attica, not the Ionian Islands (Ionioi Nisoi). The Ionian Islands are distinct from the historical region of Ionia, which is today part of western Turkey.

==== Crete ====
Crete is the largest island of Greece and the second largest in the Eastern Mediterranean, after Cyprus. The island spans 260 km from east to west and 60 km from north to south at its widest. The island narrows in the region close to Ierapetra, where it is only 12 km wide. Crete covers an area of 8,336 km^{2} (3,219 sq mi), with a coastline of 1046 km. It is surrounded to the north by the Sea of Crete; to the south by the Libyan Sea; to the west by the Myrtoan Sea; and to the east by the Karpathion Sea. It lies about 160 km south of the Greek mainland.

Crete is characterized by a mountain range crossing from west to east, formed by three different subranges:

- The White Mountains or Lefka Ori (2,452 m);
- The Idi Range (Psiloritis (35.18°N 24.82°E) 2,456 m);
- The Dikti Mountains (2,148 m)

These encompass fertile plateaus, such as Lasithi, Omalos and Nidha; caves such as Diktaion and Idaion; and gorges such as the Samariá Gorge. The protected area of the Samariá Gorge is the home of the Cretan goat, or kri-kri, while the endangered Bearded vulture or lammergeyer lives in the Cretan mountains and gorges.

Crete's rivers include the Ieropotamos River in the southern part of the island.

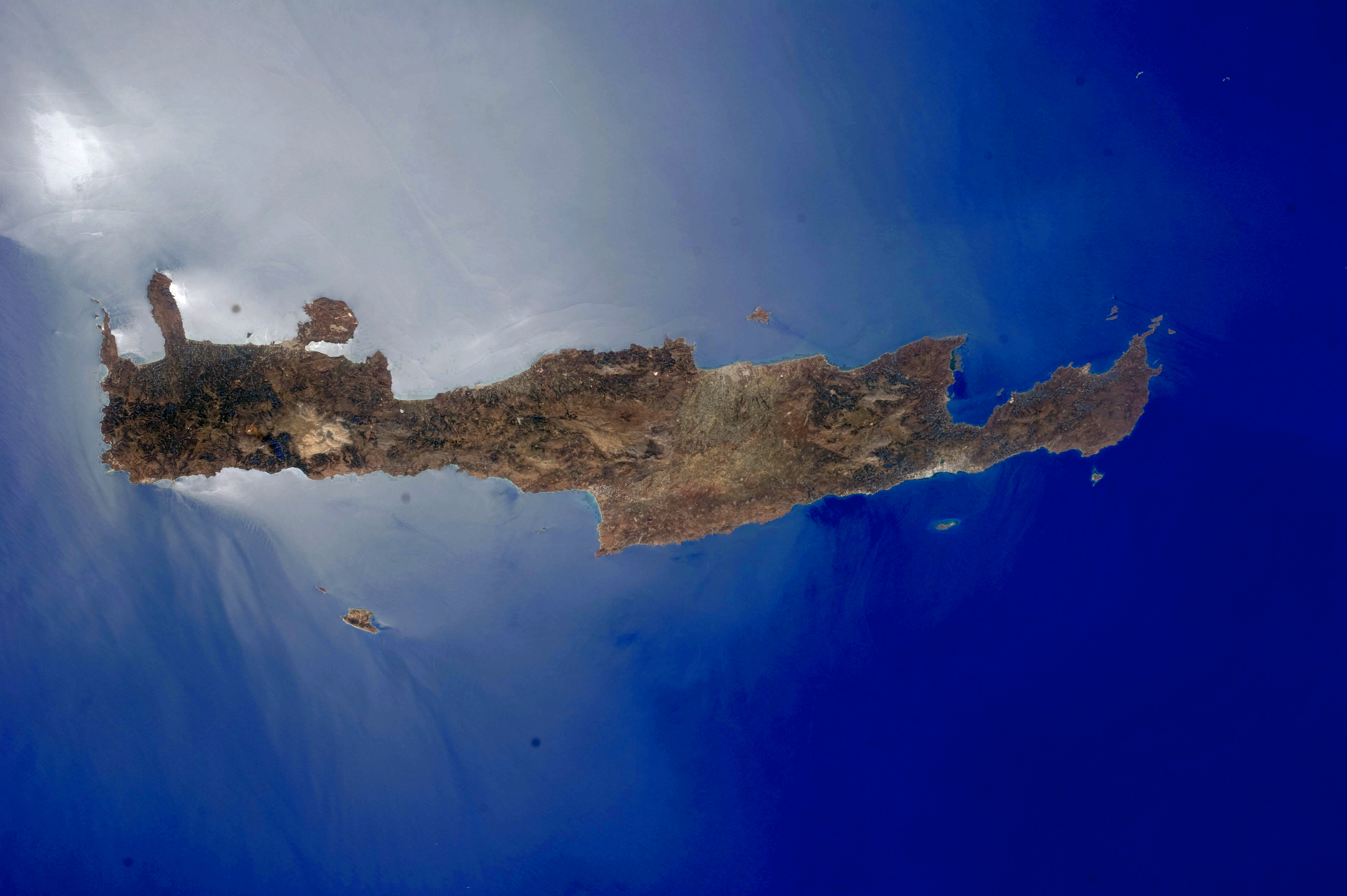
Crete (NASA photograph)

== Environment ==
Map of earthquakes in Greece and adjacent countries 1900–2017

Greece is a mostly mountainous country with a very long coastline, filled with peninsulas and islands.

The climate can range from cold semi-arid to cold climate mountain forests.

Greece's natural hazards include severe earthquakes, floods, droughts and wildfires. Current environmental issues in Greece include air pollution and water pollution.

== Climate ==
Köppen climate classification of Greece

The climate of Greece is mild. A Mediterranean climate prevails on the coast and islands, and a strong Continental climate prevails in all of the mountainous regions of the interior. Summers are hot and dry and winters are cold and humid. Summer is rainless and the almost cloudless season lasts about three months. In July and August, the temperature usually rises to around 30–35 °C and even above 40 °C. In the eastern part of the country and especially in the archipelago, a cooling Etesian wind blows in the summer, but in big cities like Athens it can get swelteringly hot. The wind can be very strong at times, which makes sailing difficult.

A special feature of Greek weather is the high amount of sunshine. It is available for six hours even in winter, and up to 12–13 hours a day in summer. The rains mostly occur in winter. Snow can be found everywhere in Greece, but it is rare in the archipelago. In low-lying areas, snow hardly ever stays on the ground more than 1 day. On the tops of the highest mountains, snow remains well into the summer. Spring and autumn are short in-between seasons when the weather is variable.

Extensive forest fires cause problems almost every year in late summer. Sometimes they lead to widespread evacuations and even deaths.

== Gallery ==
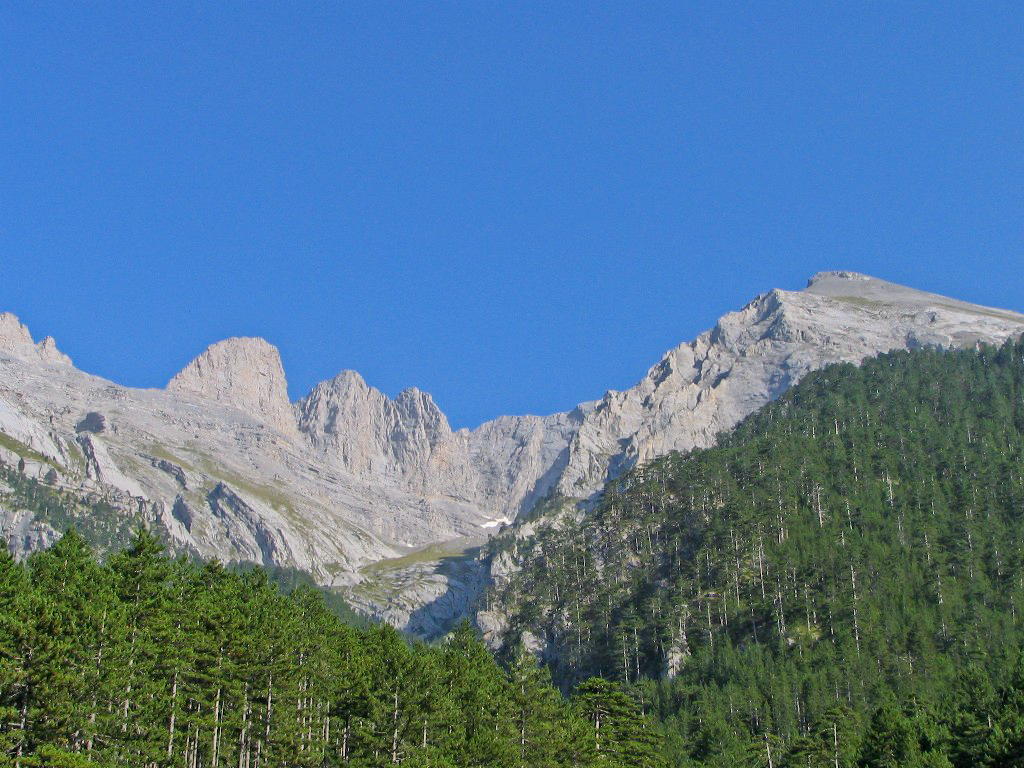
Mount Olympus

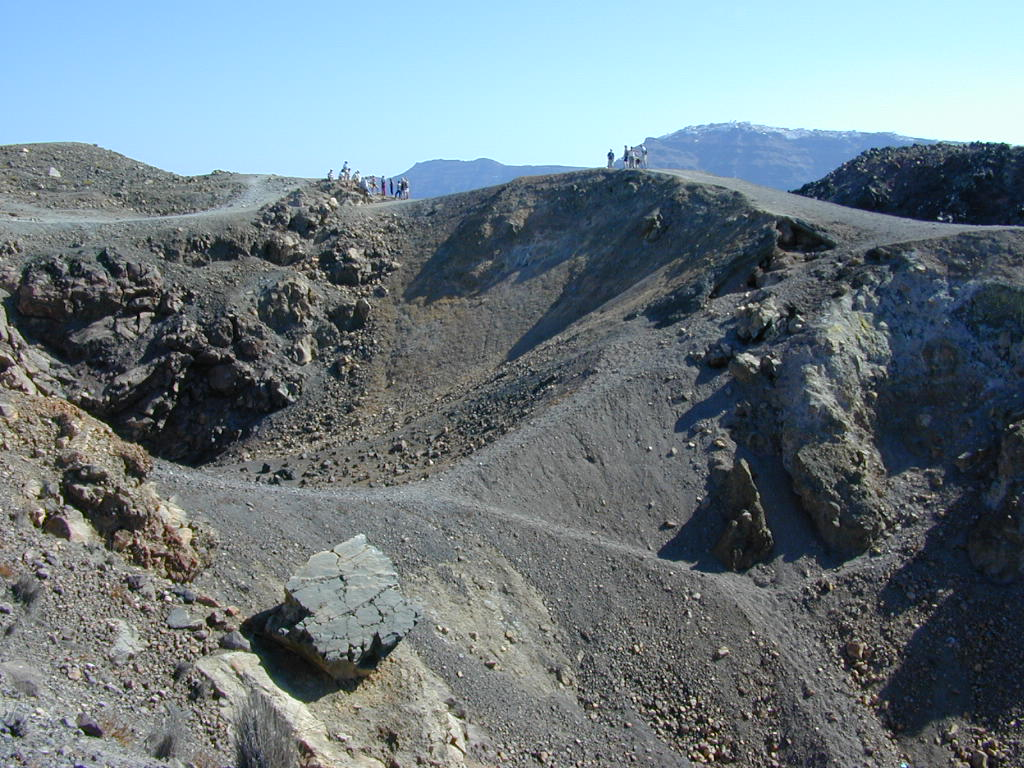
Volcanic crater, Santorini

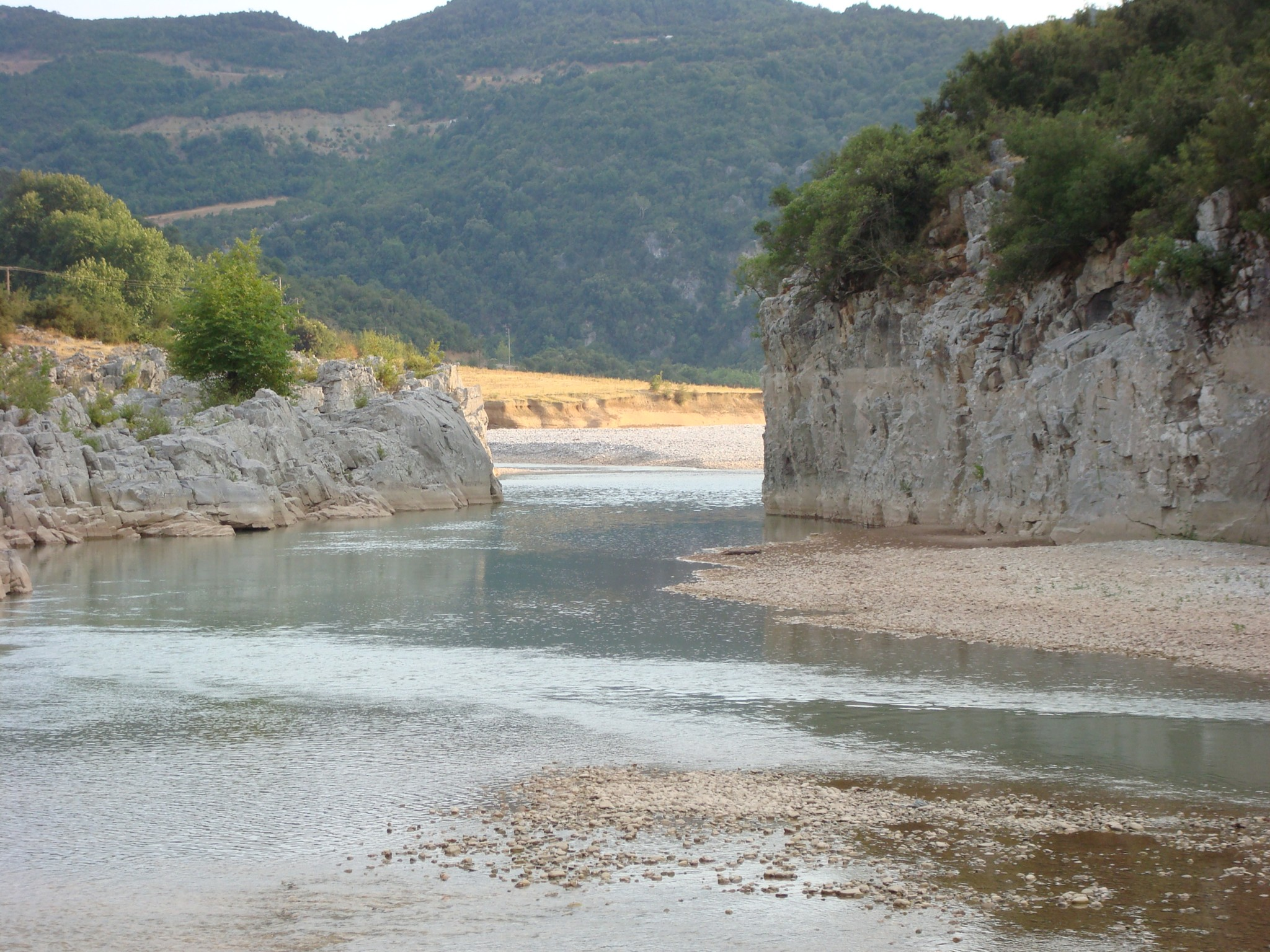
Achelous River

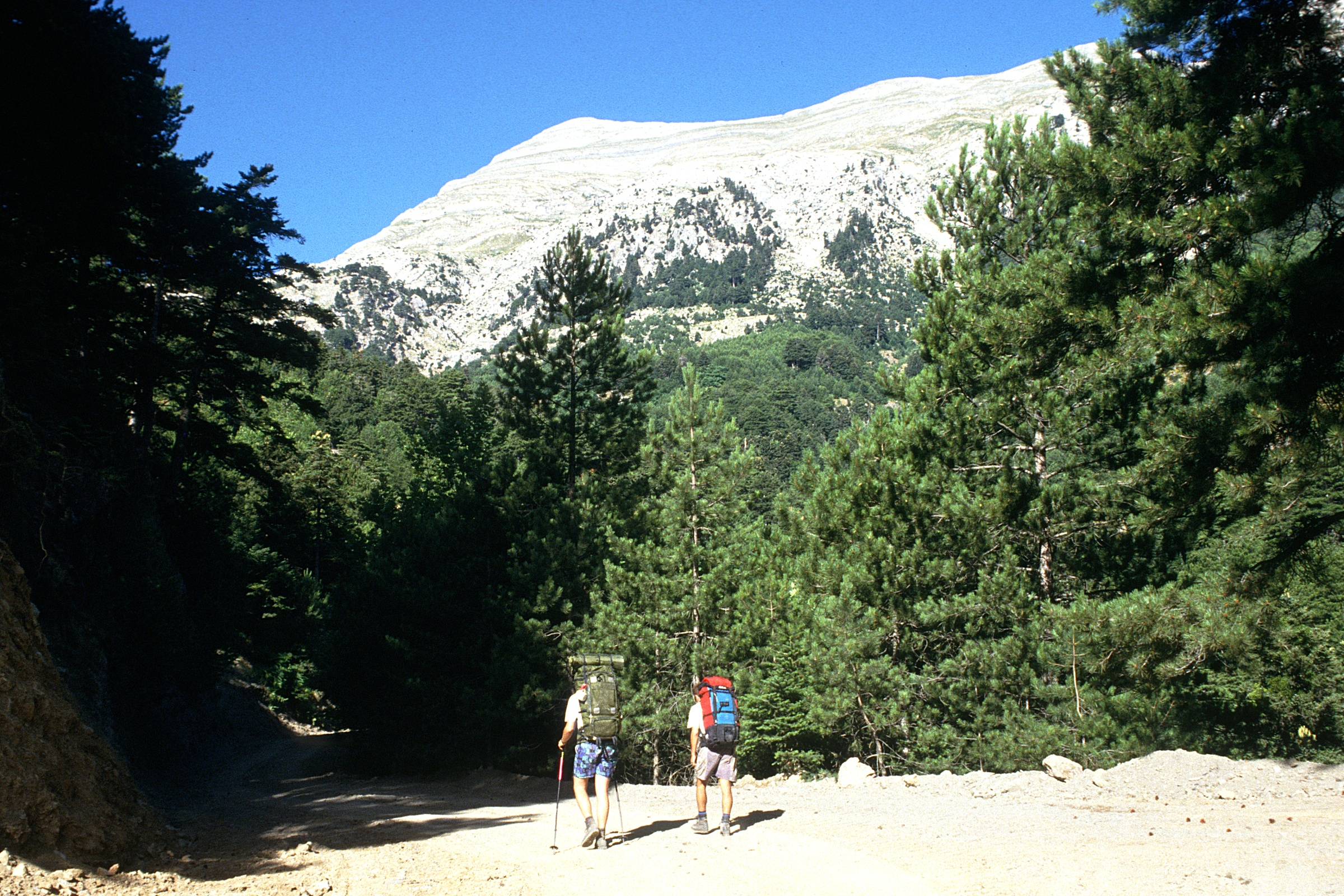
Taygetus (Mountain Range)

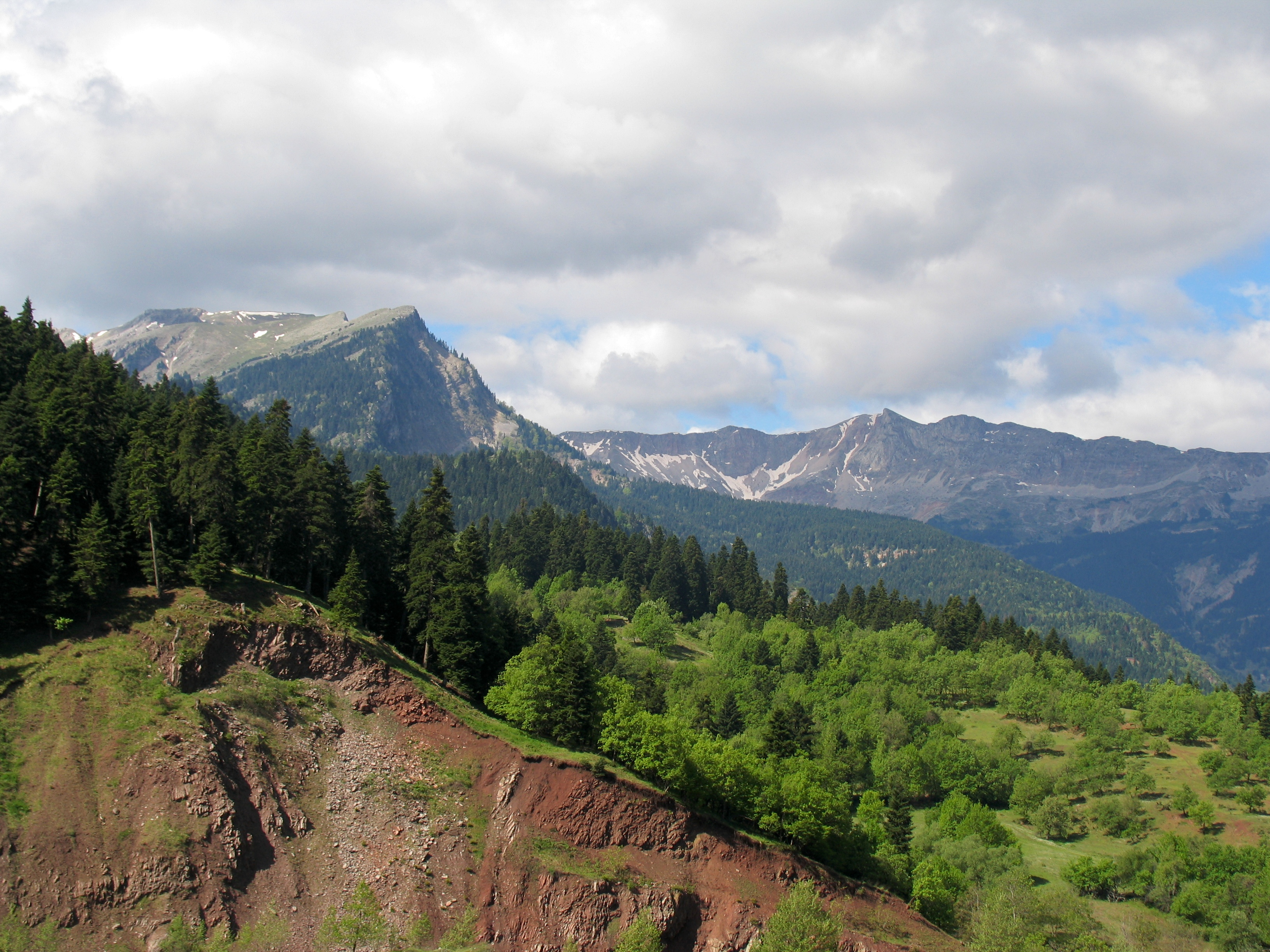
Pindus National Park

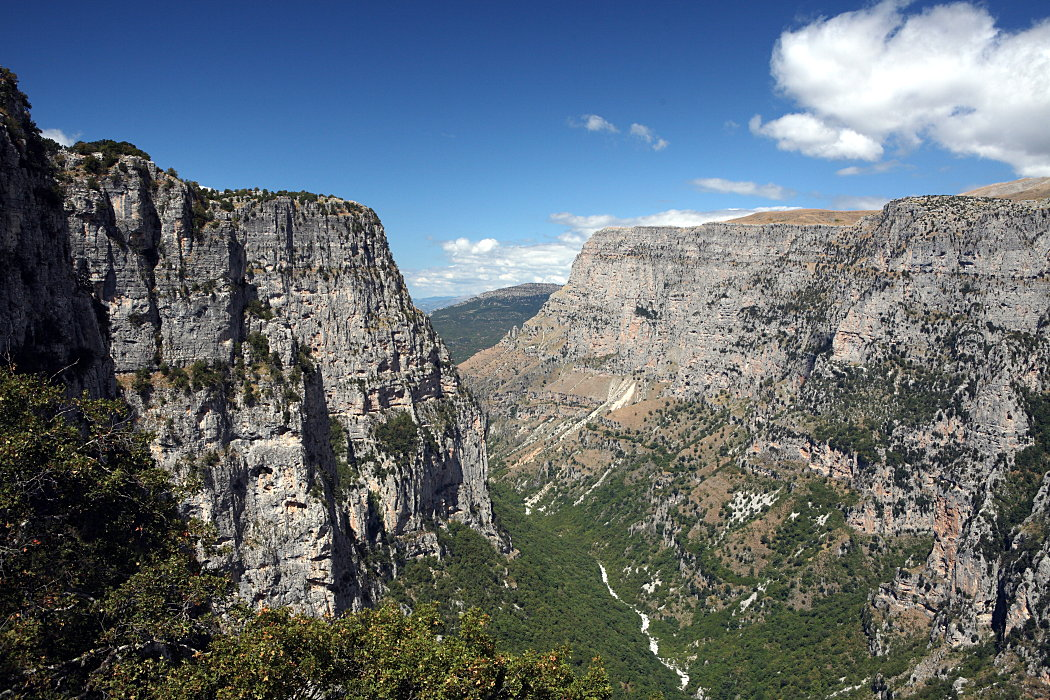
Vikos–Aoös National Park

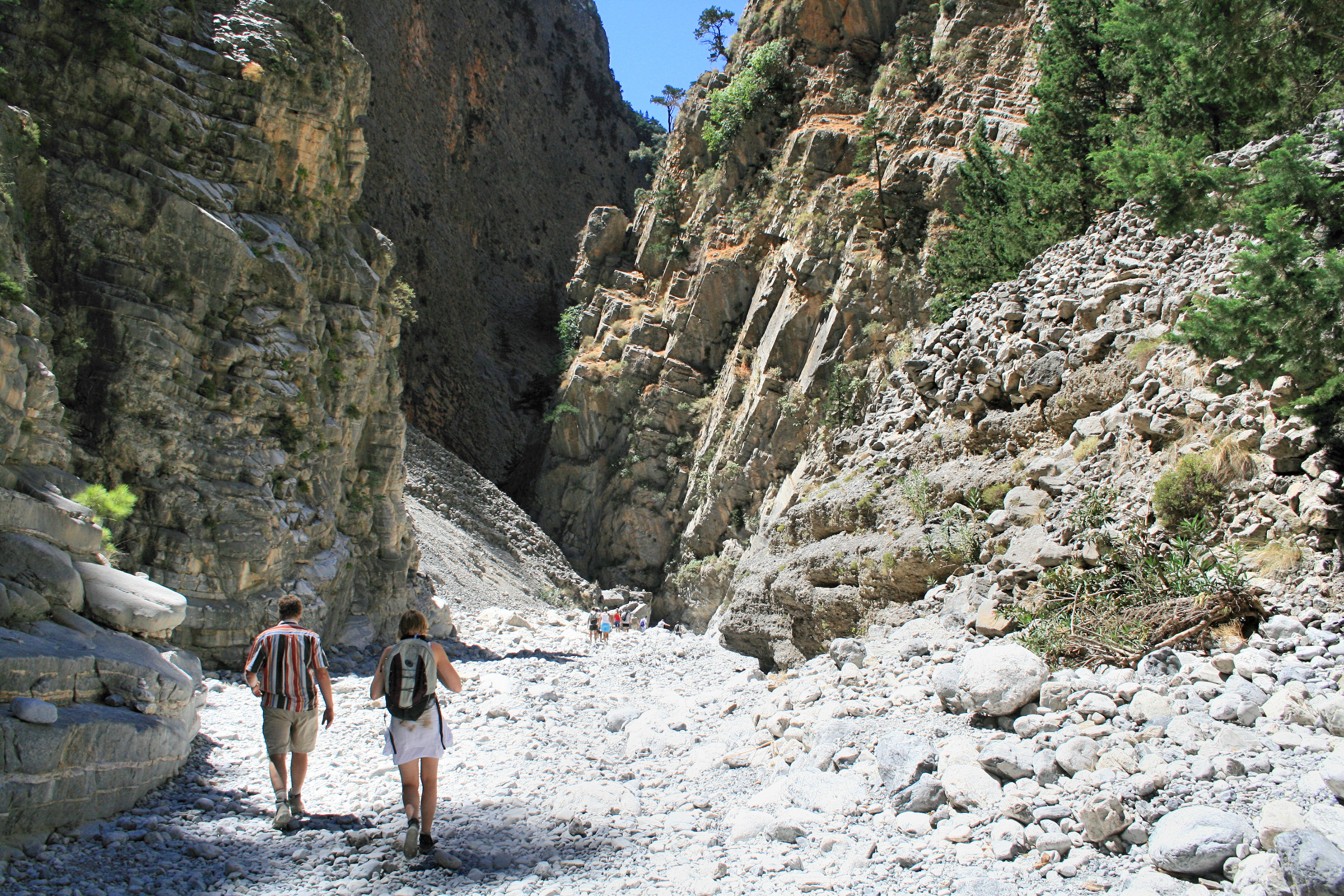
Samariá Gorge

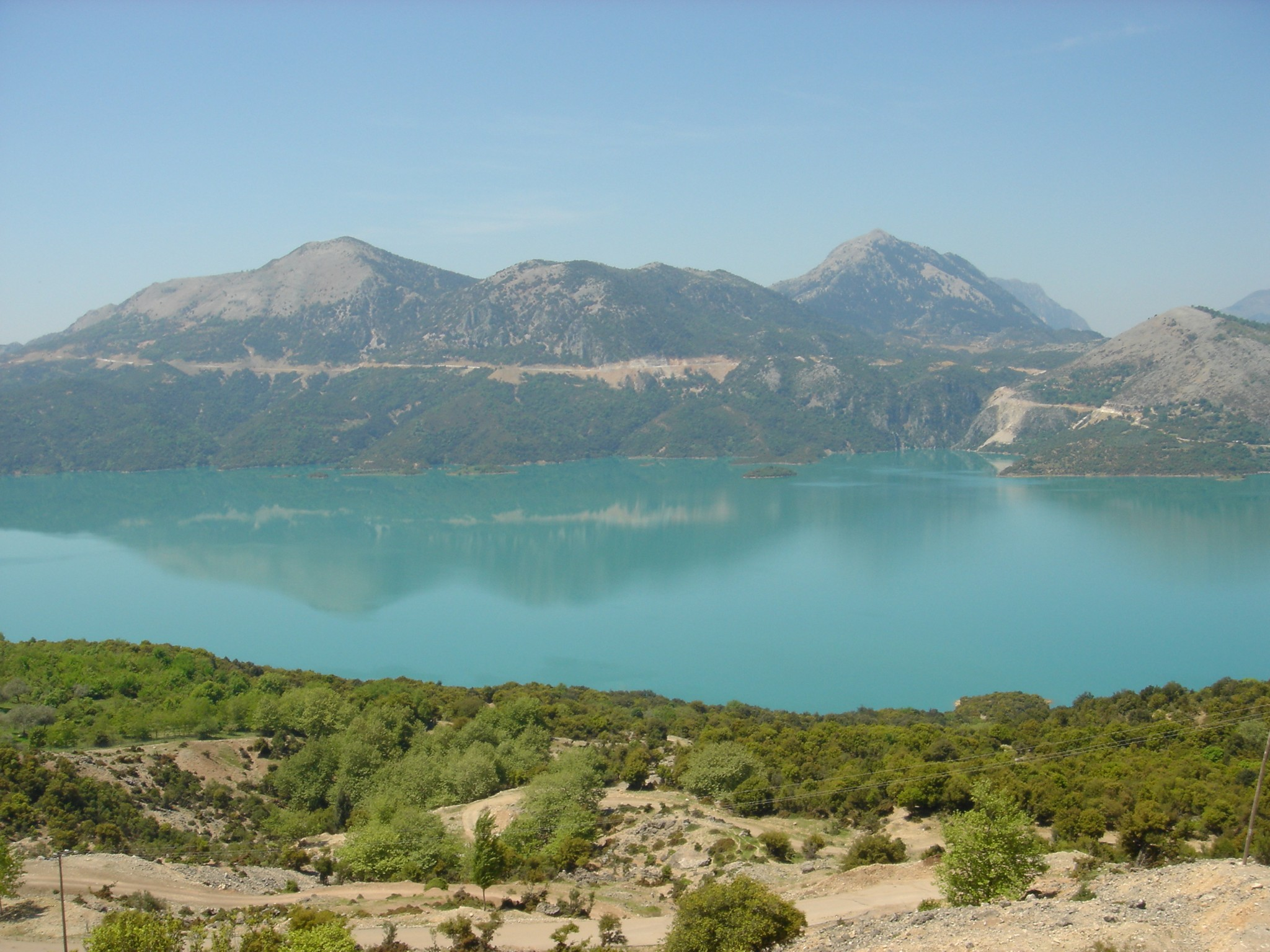
Kremasta (lake)

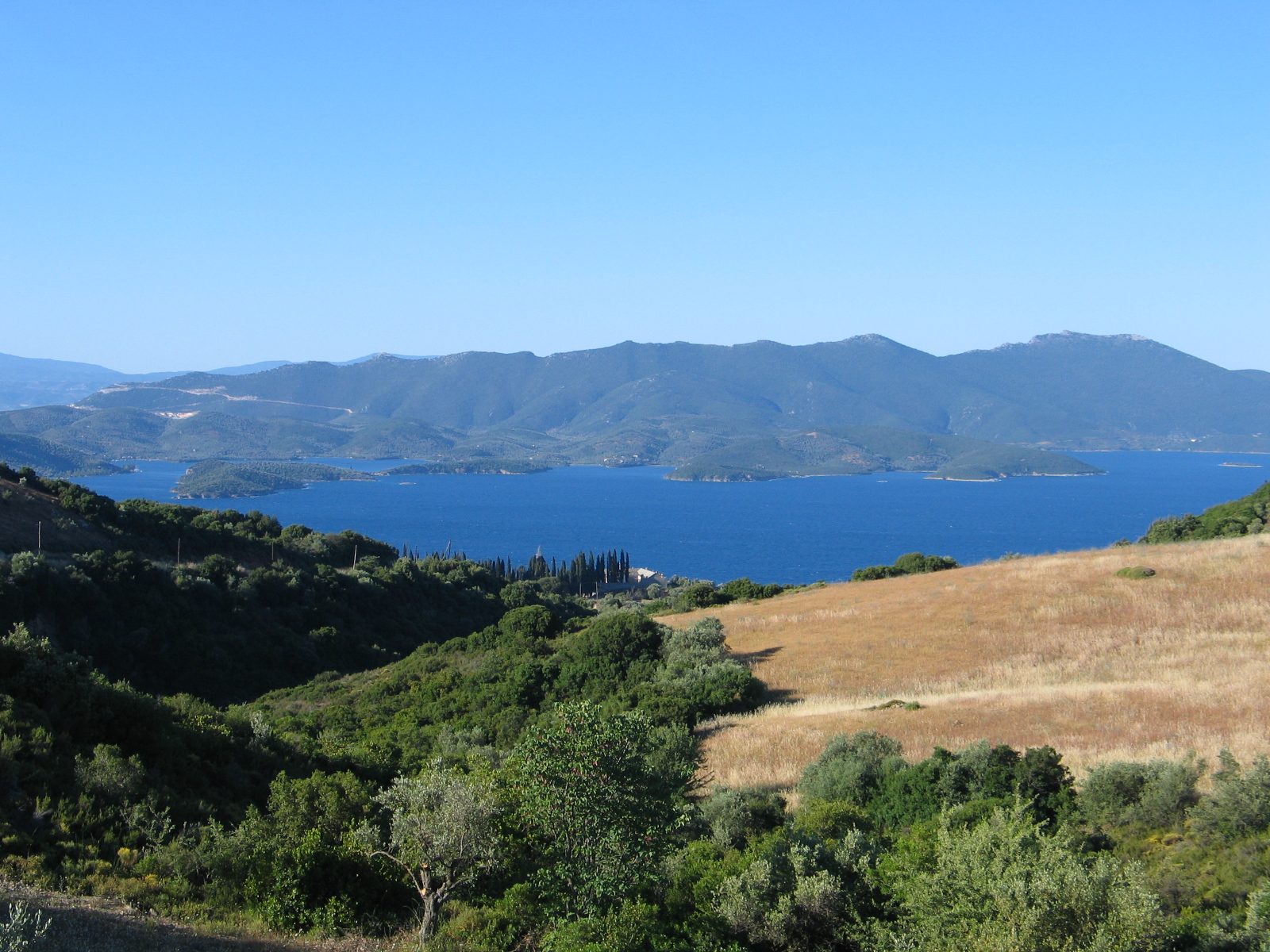
Mount Pelion

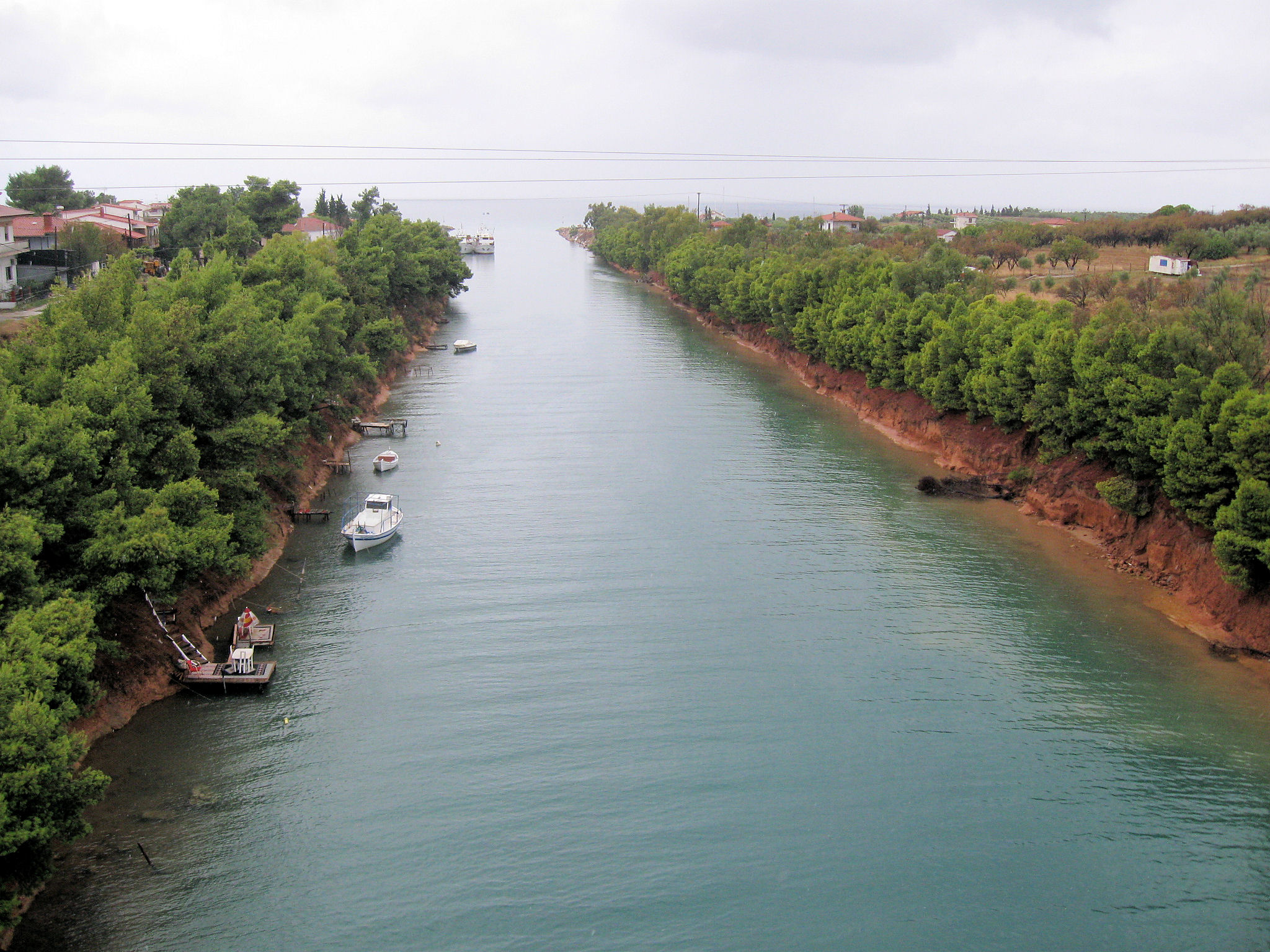
Potidea Kanal, Chalkidiki

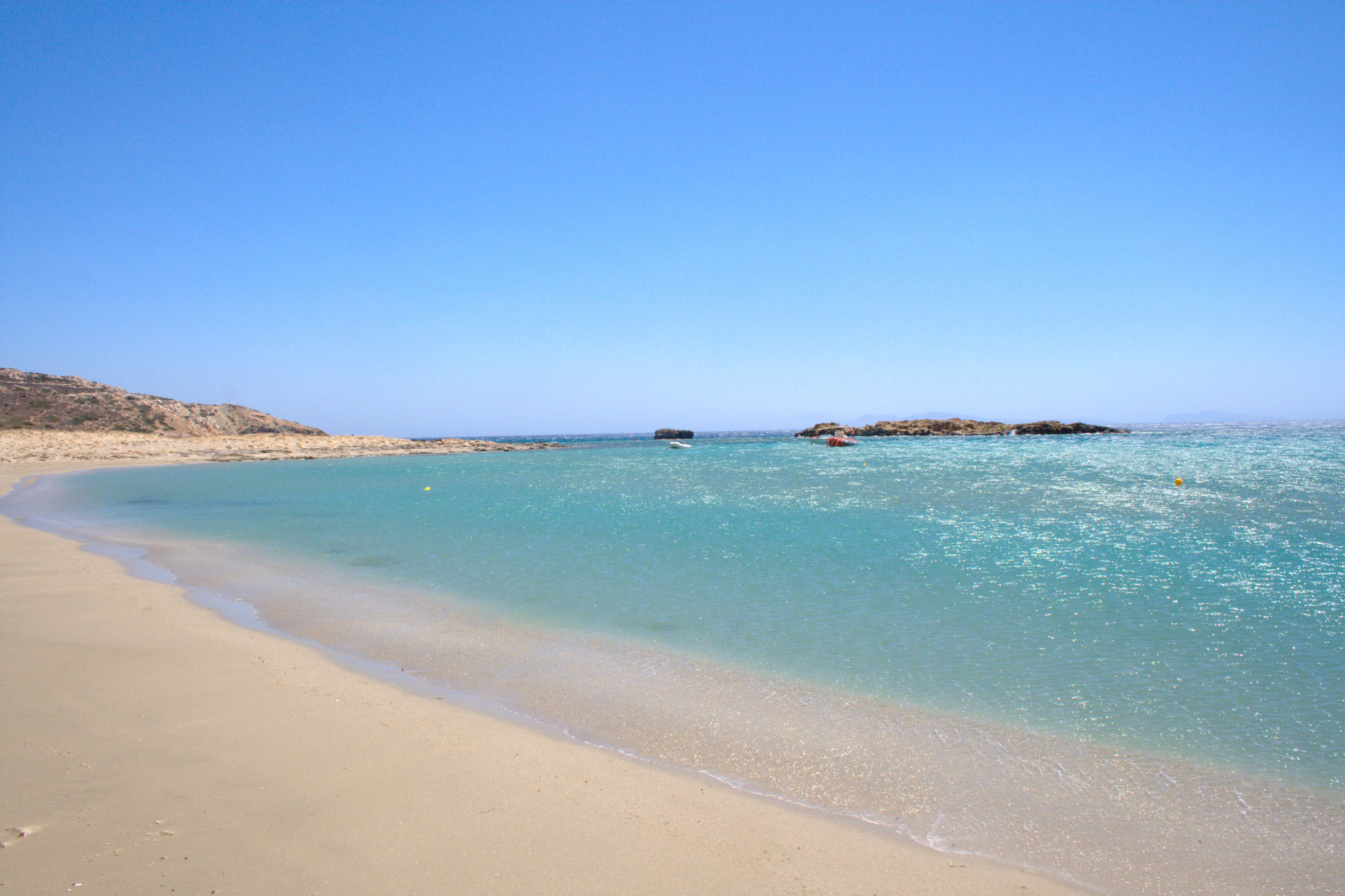
Manganari beach, Ios (island)

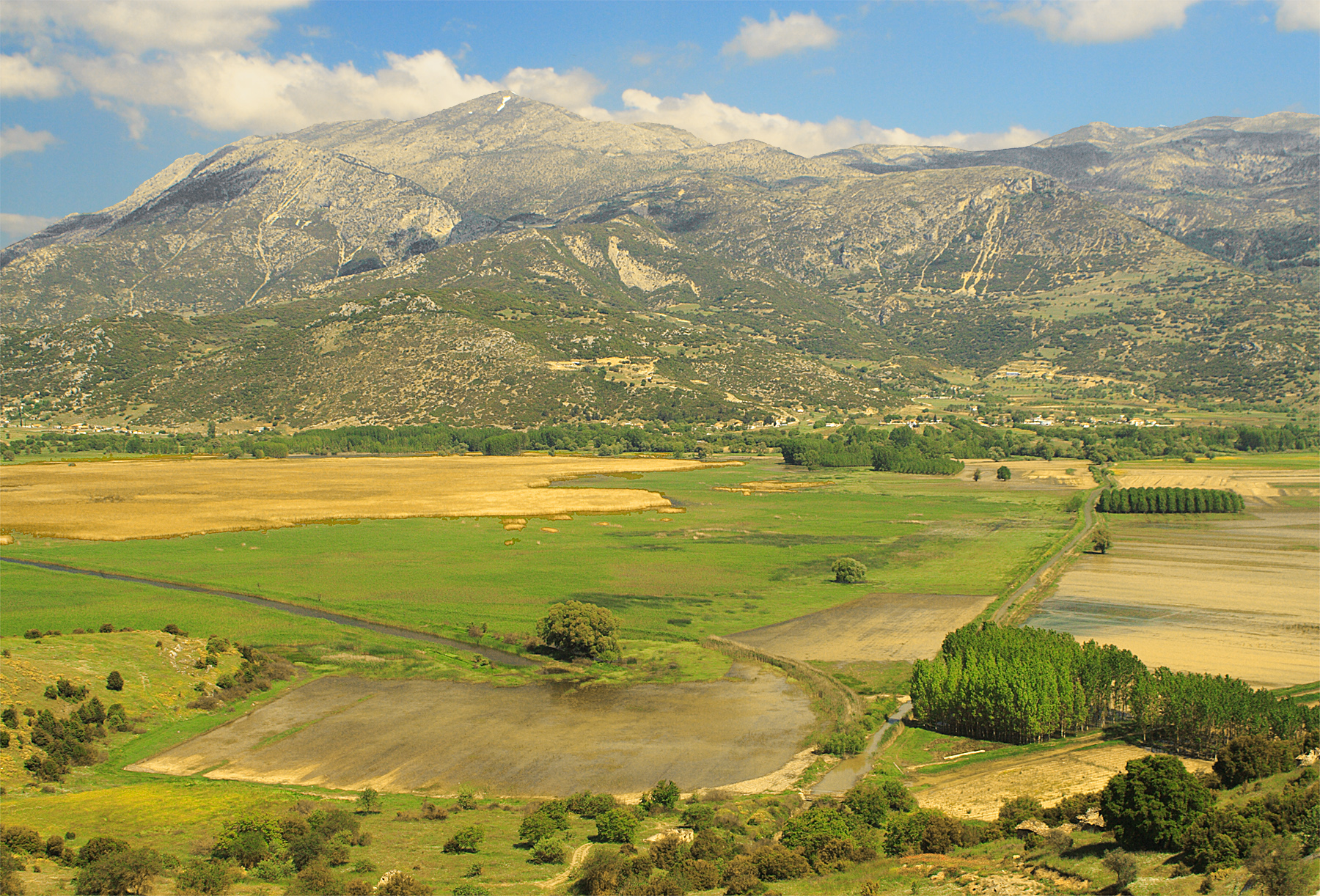
Landscape of Stymfalia with Mount Kyllini

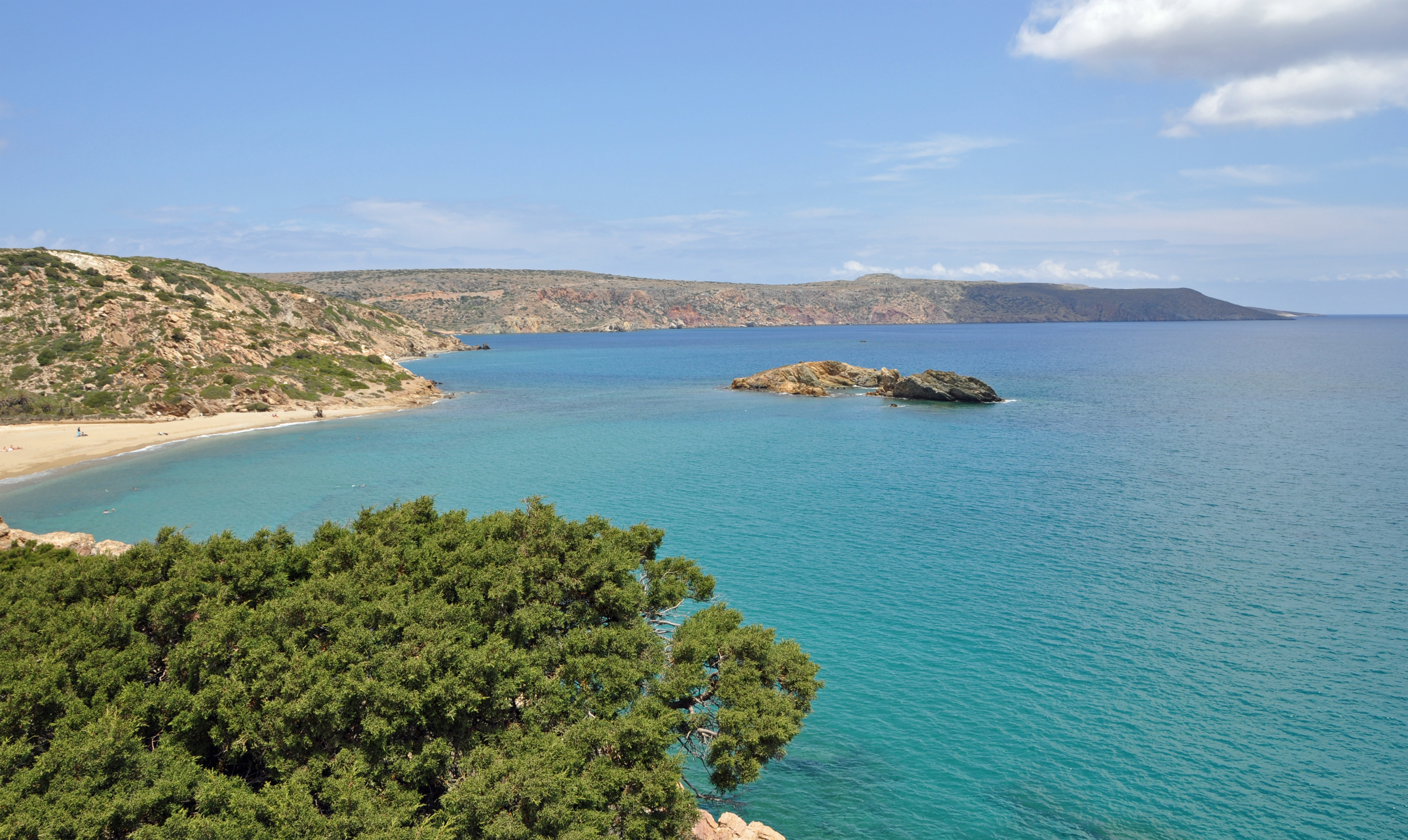
Palm beach of Vai (Crete)

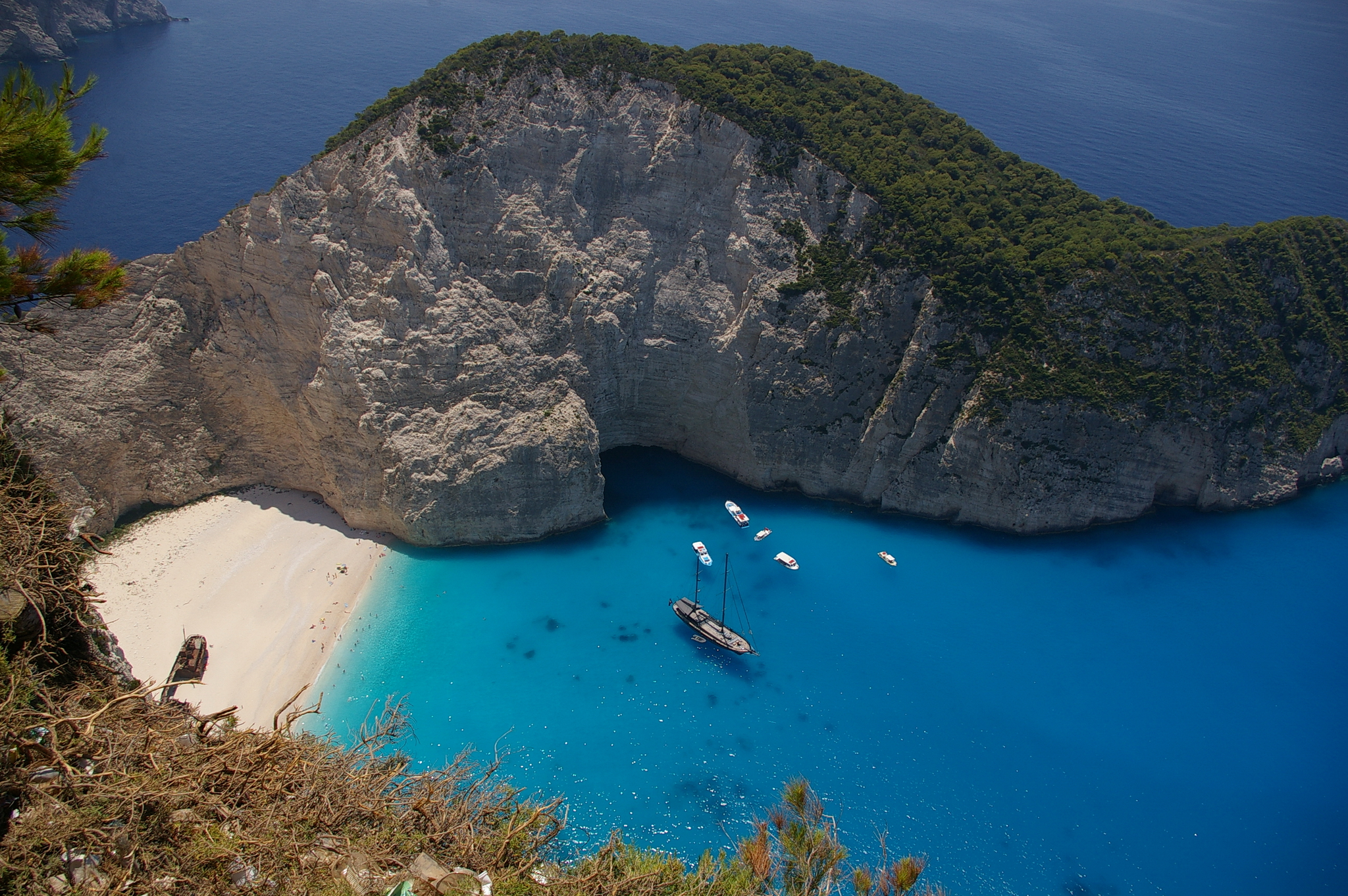
Navagio, Zakynthos

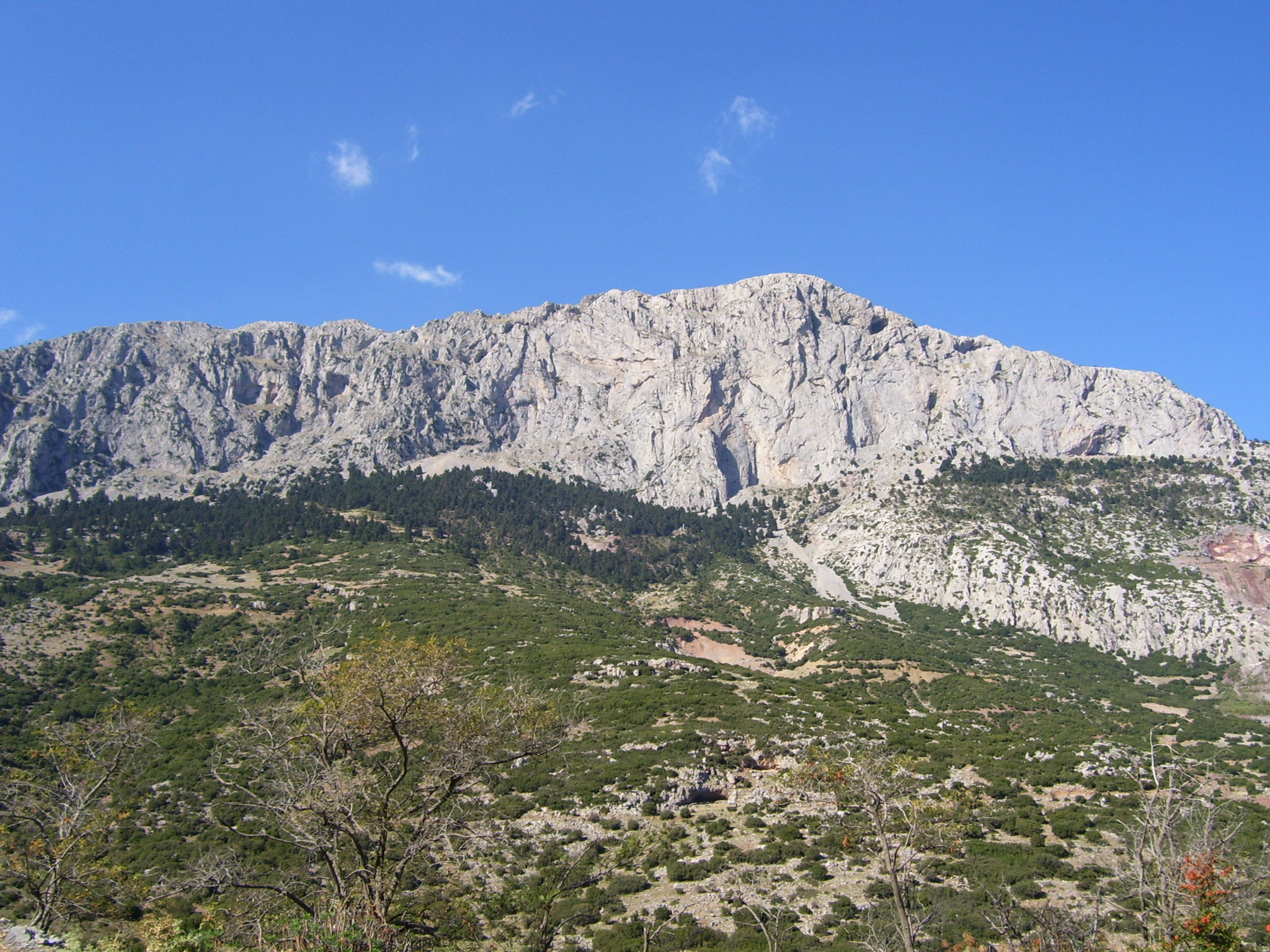
Mount Parnassus

Peloponnese

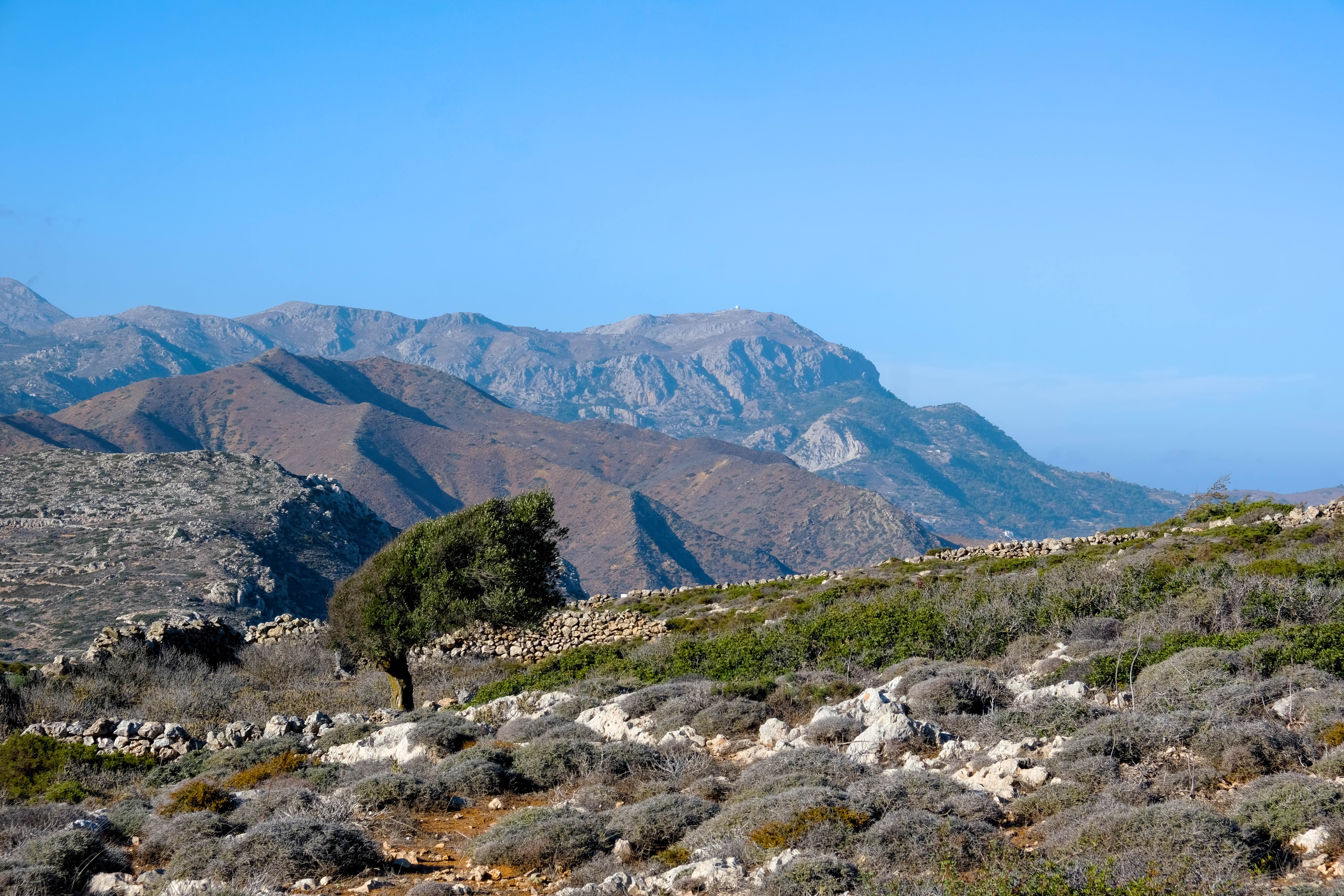
Top of mountain on Karpathos

== See also ==
- Geography of Europe
- Greek names of mountains
- List of earthquakes in Greece
- List of islands of Greece
- National parks of Greece
- Wildlife of Greece
