= Palaestinus =

Son of Poseidon in Greek mythology

Palaestinus (Ancient Greek: Παλαιστῖνος) was in Greek mythology a son of Poseidon and father of Haliacmon. From grief at the death of his son, Palaestinus threw himself into the river, which was called after him Palaestinus, and subsequently Strymon.
