= Haliacmon (mythology) =

Ancient Greek river god

Haliacmon (or Aliacmon, Ancient Greek: Ἁλιάκμων) was in Greek mythology a son of Oceanus and Tethys. He was a minor river god in his own right, of the eponymous Haliacmon in Macedonia. In other mythological traditions he was the son of Palaestinus and grandson of Poseidon.
