= Krimini =

Village in the Western Macedonia region of Greece

Krimini Κριμήνι
- Community
- Location within Greece
- Coordinates: 40°12′49″N 21°17′04″E
- Country: Greece
- Administrative region: Western Macedonia
- Regional unit: Kozani
- Municipality: Voio
- Municipal unit: Tsotyli

Population (2021)
  - Community: 40
- Time zone: UTC+2 (EET)
  - Summer (DST): UTC+3 (EEST)
- Postal code: 50002
- Area code: +30 2468

Krimini is a village located in the Voio municipality, situated in Kozani regional unit, in the Western Macedonia region of Greece. The village of Rodochori is nearby.

Krimini's elevation is 730 metres (2,400 ft) above sea level. At the 2021 census, the population was 40. The town is notable for the Ethnographic Museum of Krimini.

== History ==
Krimini (from the Greek word for "precipice") is a relatively new village by Greek standards, having been formed around 1720. Before that, the village (Old Krimini) was located further north in the Grammos mountain range, where its steep precipices and rugged terrain protected the inhabitants from persecution by the numerous conquerors of Macedonia.
