= Lake Polyfyto =

Reservoir in Western Macedonia, Greece

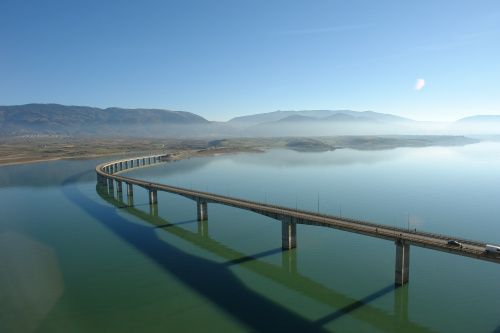

- Location within Greece
- Official name: Greek: Λίμνη Πολυφύτου
- Location: Kozani regional unit, Greece
- Coordinates: 40°18′08″N 22°06′04″E
- Opening date: 1974
- Owner: PPC (ΔΕΗ)

Dam and spillways
- Impounds: Aliakmon
- Height: 112 m (367 ft)

Reservoir
- Total capacity: 1,220×10^{6} m^{3} (4.3×10^{10} cu ft)
- Surface area: 74 km^{2} (29 sq mi)
- Normal elevation: 289 m (948 ft)

Power Station
- Installed capacity: 375 MW

Lake Polyfyto (Greek: Λίμνη Πολυφύτου) is one of the largest artificial lakes in Greece. It was created in 1974 by the construction of the Polyfyto Dam, which impounds the river Aliakmon, by the Public Power Corporation of Greece. The maximum accumulated volume is 1,220×10^{6} m^{3} (4.3×10^{10} cu ft). The surface area of the lake is 74 km^{2} (29 sq mi), and the elevation of the lake surface at maximum filling is 289 m (948 ft). The design capacity of the hydroelectric power station at the dam is 375 MW.

The lake is located in the Kozani regional unit. There are two bridges over the lake: one at Neraida (Servia High Bridge, Greek National Road 3) and a smaller one near Rymnio. The dam is near the village Polyfyto.
