= Geropotamos (river) =

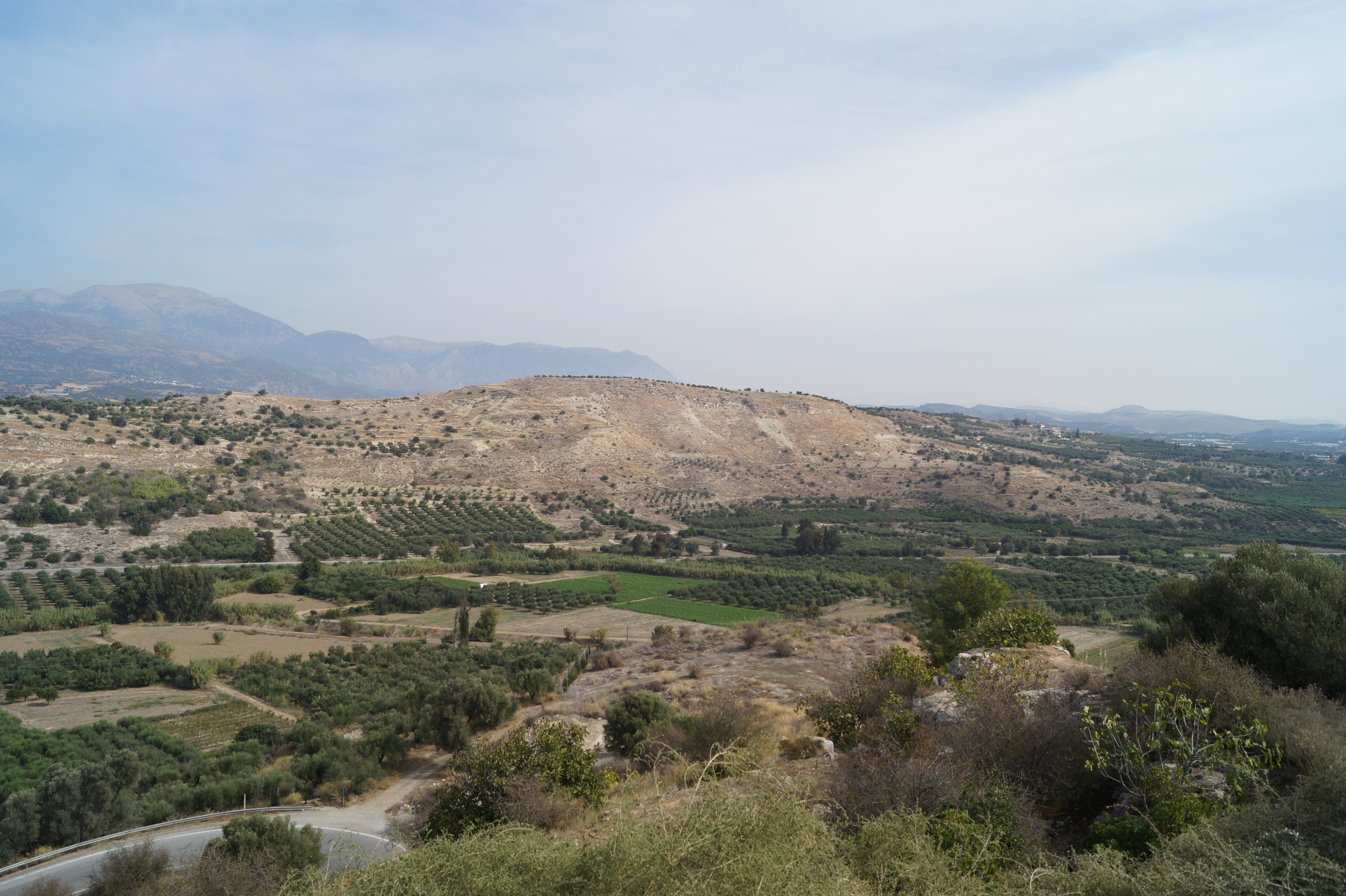
- Native name: Γεροπόταμος (Greek)

Location
- Country: Greece

Physical characteristics
- Mouth
  - location: Libyan Sea
  - coordinates: 35°03′30″N 24°45′08″E
- Basin size: 553 km^{2} (214 sq mi)

The Geropotamos (Greek: Γεροπόταμος or Ιερός Ποταμός) is a watercourse in southern Crete in Greece. Its drainage area is 553 km^{2} (214 sq mi). It rises on the north slope of the Asterousia Mountains, near the village Sternes. It flows west through the Messara Plain and discharges into the Libyan Sea near Tympaki. This river was a source of water supply for the ancient Minoan settlement of Phaistos. The Ieropotamos was heavily drawn upon by the Minoans because of the intensity of farming, even in the Bronze Age at Phaistos. Scientists have determined that the groundwater basin may have been overdrafted some time in the Bronze Age, being a contributing factor to the mysterious depopulation of Phaistos.
