= Greek names of mountains =

This is a list of mountain tops and ranges in Greece and around the world that have a Greek name.

Greek	English name(s), [other name(s)] - [older name(s)], [Area]
Αιγάλεω	Mount Egaleo, Piraeus
Άθως	Mount Athos, aka Hagion Oros (Holy Mount), Macedonia
Αίνος	Mount Ainos
Αίτνα	Mount Etna, Sicily, Italy
Άλπεις	Alps, France to Austria
Αππένινα	Apennines, Italian Peninsula
Αροανία	Mount Aroania, aka Chelmos
Βεργίνα	Mount Vergina
Γερανεία	Mount Geraneia
Δίβρη	Mount Divri, Greece
Δίρφυς	Mount Dirphys
Έλικον, -κο	Mount Helicon
Ζήρια	Mount Ziria, aka Mount Kyllini, Achaea-Corinthia
Κυλλήνη	Mount Kyllini aka Ziria
Λυκαβηττός	Mount Lycabettus
Μαίναλον, -λο	Mount Maenalon, Mainalon
Μίνθη	Mount Minthi, Elis
Οινόη	Mount Oenoe, Greece
Οίτη	Mount Oeta
Όλυμπος	Mount Olympus, Greece
Όλυμπος (Κύπρος)	Mount Olympus, Cyprus
Όσσα or Κίσσαβος	Mount Ossa
Παντωκράτορ, -ρας	Mount Pantokrator, some prefer Pantocrator
Παρνασσός	Mount Parnassus, Boeotia, Phocis
Πάρνηθα (anc. Gk. Πάρνης)	Mount Parnetha/Parnitha, Athens
Πεννίοες	Pennines, Scotland
Πεντέλη	Mount Pentelicus/Penteli, Athens
Πήλιον, -ιο	Mount Pelion
Πίνδος	Pindus/Pindos Mountains
Σκόλλις	Mount Skollis, some prefer Mount Scollis
Ταΰγετος	Mount Taygetus, Taygetos
Υμηττός	Mount Hymettus, Athens
Φολόη	Mount Pholoe, Ilia, Greece
Χελμός	Mount Chelmos aka Aroania, Achaea
