= Lake Polyfytos Bridge =

Servia High Bridge Υψηλή Γέφυρα Σερβίων
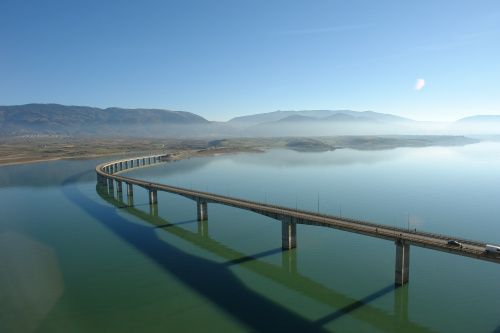
- The bridge over the artificial Lake Polyfyto of Haliacmon river
- Coordinates: 40°13′58″N 21°58′26″E
- Carries: EO3/E65 (Athens - Lamia - Larissa - Kozani - Florina)
- Crosses: Lake Polyfyto
- Locale: Kozani regional unit, Greece
- Owner: Government of Greece

Characteristics
- Design: Cantilever bridge by Riccardo Morandi
- Total length: 1,372 meters (4,501 ft)
- Width: 13.5 meters (44 ft)

History
- Constructed by: joint venture Xekte SA–Skapaneus SA.
- Opened: 6 November 1976; 49 years ago

Location
- Interactive map of Servia High Bridge; Υψηλή Γέφυρα Σερβίων

The Servia High Bridge (Greek: Υψηλή Γέφυρα Σερβίων, romanized: Ypsili Gefyra Servion) is one of the longest bridges in Greece, with a length of 1,372 m. Construction began in 1972 along with the artificial lake and was completed in 1975.

Designed by Riccardo Morandi, was constructed from a joint venture Xekte SA–Skapaneus SA.

The bridge is a part of the EO3/E65 (Athens - Lamia - Larissa - Kozani - Florina) and is located 15 km southeast of the city of Kozani and 5 km northwest of Servia. It is one of the two bridges of the lake; the other is the Rymnios Bridge to the southwest near Aiani and is smaller, with 615 m length.

== Structural issues raised in 2020 ==
In January 2020, and after visual inspections conducted by professor Stergios Mitoulis of infrastructuResilience, it was found that ageing, environmental stressors and increase in the traffic loads on the bridge potentially led to safety issues. Amid these concerns, traffic restrictions were enforced on the bridge. These preventive measures aimed to reduce the maximum load on the bridge and included banning vehicles heavier than 50 tonnes and reducing the vehicle speed limit to 40 kilometers per hour.

Professor Mitoulis noted following the inspection of the bridge that there were “vertical displacements on some of the bridge spans that are visible” and that “central simply supported segments of the deck are not well connected to the balanced cantilevers of the deck and hence there is a risk of falling.” Professor Mitoulis also explained that the simply supported spans need to be connected to the balanced cantilevers, whilst the movement of the latter seems to be the main issue that needs urgently addressing. Further studies included a recent publication

The bridge had been inspected in the past from the relevant ministry in 1995 after the Kozani earthquake, and again in 2012.

== Gallery ==
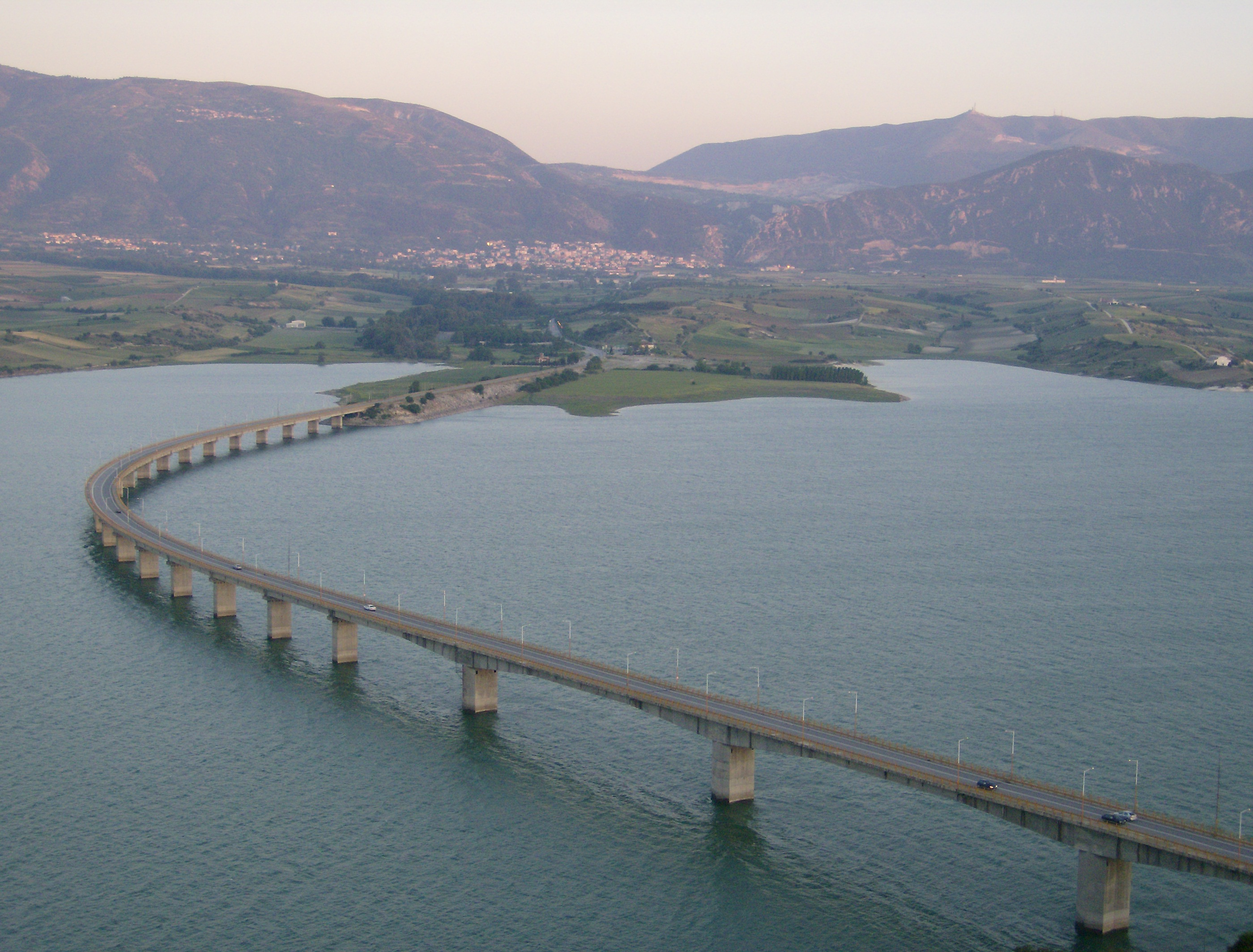
The bridge of Polyphytos lake.

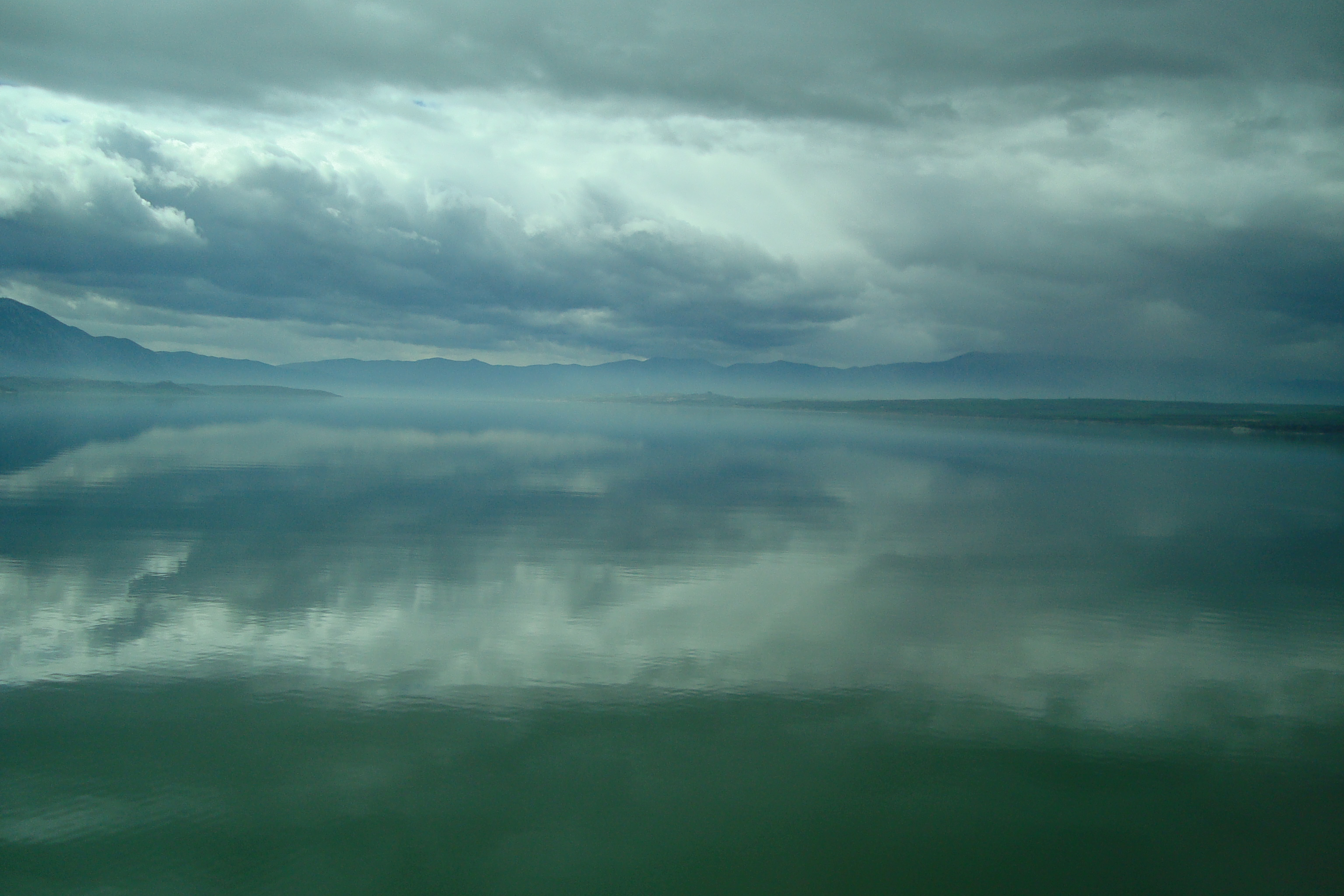
Polyphytos lake.
