= Haliacmon =

River in Macedonia, Greece

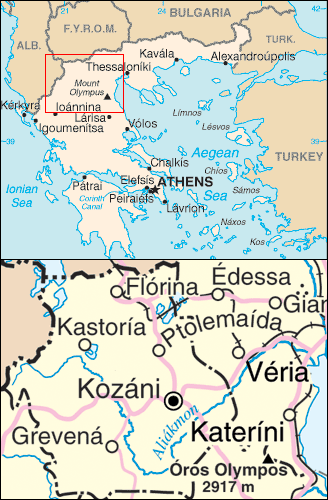
- Native name: Αλιάκμονας (Greek)

Location
- Country: Greece

Physical characteristics
- Source
  - location: Pindus Mountains
  - coordinates: 40°21′50.95″N 20°48′9.18″E
  - elevation: ~2100 m (~6,890 ft)
- Mouth
  - location: Aegean Sea
  - coordinates: 40°28′4″N 22°39′15″E
- Length: 297 km (185 mi)
- Basin size: 8,813 km^{2} (3,403 sq mi)

The Haliacmon (Greek: Αλιάκμονας, Aliákmonas; formerly: Ἁλιάκμων, Aliákmon or Haliákmōn) is the longest river of Greece, flowing entirely on Greek soil in the region of Macedonia, with a total length of 297 km (185 mi). In Greece there are three rivers longer than Haliacmon: Evros (Greek: Έβρος), Strymonas (Greek: Στρυμόνας), both coming from Bulgaria, and Axios (Greek: Αξιός) coming from North Macedonia, but the length of each one of them in Greek territory is less than that of Haliacmon, which flows entirely in Greece. Haliacmon is the traditional English name for the river, but many sources cite the formerly official Katharevousa version of the name, Aliákmon. Today, the only official variant is the demotic Aliákmonas. It flows through the Greek regions of Western Macedonia (Kastoria, Grevena and Kozani regional units) and Central Macedonia (Imathia and Pieria regional units). Its drainage basin is 8,813 km^{2} (3,403 sq mi).

== Name ==
The Latin name Haliacmon is derived from Ancient Greek Αλιάκμονας, a composite derived from άλας (salt, sea) and άκμων (anvil). In Greek mythology, Haliacmon was one of the river gods, who were sons of Oceanus and Tethys, according to the allegorical obsessive-anthropomorphic concept familiar to the Ancient Greeks, on geological upheaval after Deucalion's deluge.

An ancient tradition says that sheep that drank water from Haliacmon would turn their colour to white. This tradition is confirmed by the following record of the Roman author Pliny the Elder (23-79 AD) : Similarly in Macedonia, those who want their sheep to be white go to Haliacmon, while those (who want them to be) black (go) to Axios (Vardar).

Ottoman Turks called the river Ince-Karasu (narrow-black water), a name still used in Turkey. The Eastern South Slavic name is Бистрица, Bistritsa (Бистрица, from Proto-Slavic *-bystr, meaning "clear, lucid, limpid") which is still in use in Bulgaria and North Macedonia.

== Course and tributaries ==
Before the construction of its diversion dam near the village of Aghia Varvara in the mid-1950s, Haliacmon had no permanent river bed in its lowland course. It often flooded and formed extensive marshes. Its devastating fury in December 1935 remains fresh in memory of the elder inhabitants of the region (Veria and Alexandreia).

The Haliacmon rises in the Gramos mountains of Western Macedonia, near the international border with Albania. In its upper course it flows generally towards the east, and turns southeast near Kastoria. It describes a wide curve around the Vourinos mountains, and turns northeast near the village Paliouria. It feeds the large artificial lake Polyfyto, that was created after the construction of the namesake hydroelectric dam and consists almost its entire course through the Kozani prefecture. Over the bridge runs the Lake Polyfytos Bridge, part of the Athens-Kozani national road. Southeast of Veria, the Haliacmon enters the central Macedonian plains, an area of great importance to agriculture. It flows into the Thermaic Gulf west of the delta of the Axios (Vardar), northeast of the coastal town Methoni.

Haliacmon's tributaries include Gramos, Ladopotamos, Pramoritsa, Grevenitikos, Venetikos, Tripotamos and Krasopoulis.

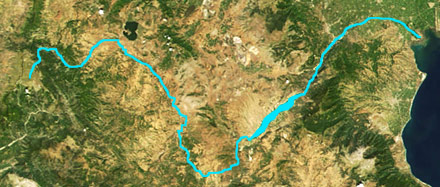
Course of the Haliacmon, as seen from the Terra satellite. (The river course has been highlighted.)

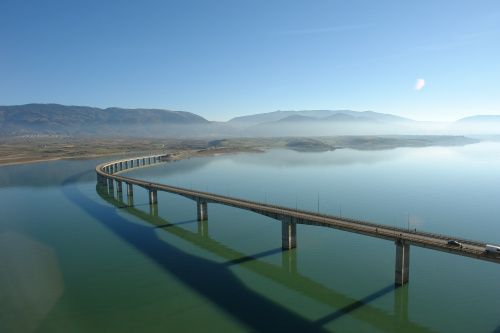
The bridge (1352 m.) over the Polyphytos artificial lake of the river Aliakmonas near Servia.

The Haliacmon flows along the towns (in downstream order) Nestorio, Argos Orestiko, Neapoli, Paliouria, Velventos, Veria and Alexandreia.

== Wetland ==
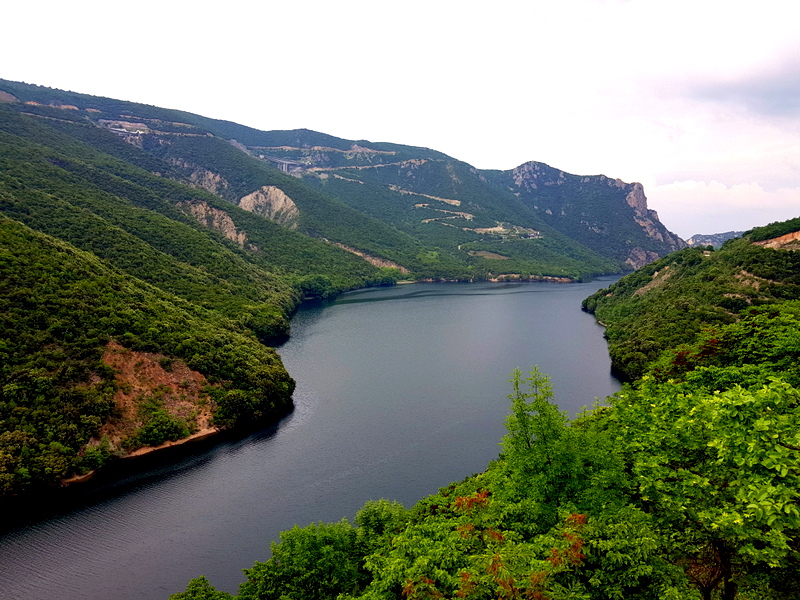
Haliacmon (Aliakmonas)

Haliacmon contains 33 kinds of fish. These include brown trout, gilt-head bream, sardine, carp, pike, eel, european anchovy, nursehound, bogue, garfish, red porgy, saddled seabream, angler, bream, mediterranean sand smelt, sand steenbras, mullus barbatus, freshwater bass, tuna, salmon, Mediterranean moray, weever, longfin gurnard, dogfish, dusky grouper, school shark and turbot. About 30 of them are indigenous, while the rest were introduced by human intervention. Many of them are considered scarce and one, mavrotsironi, lives nowhere else in the world, i.e. it is endemic. Μost of these kinds of fish have no commercial value but only biological, since they support the food web. Fish found in Haliacmon, like carp and rainbow trout, indicate that its water is still pure. Some eels are found in its estuaries, that cannot migrate, hindered by the dams.

For amateur fishermen the river has been enriched with introduced rainbow trout, that is not easy to reproduce, so there is no danger of disturbance of the river's ecosystem.

In the place where the river flows into the sea, there has been formed over the years an extended delta of 4.000 hectares, because of the large dam that was constructed and retains much of the brought matters. As a result, silting has been greatly reduced and during the summer, when there is not much water, the sea enters and largely overwhelms the river bed. Flathead mullets and European seabasses are found in Haliacmon's delta. In the shallow marine areas formed there, the fry of many Aegean Sea's fish finds a place to reproduce, while about 90% of Greece's mussels are produced in the Haliacmon-Axios (Vardar) delta. Aliki Kitrous is an area of 254 hectares, where 15–20.000 tons of salt are produced per year. The delta is a national park known as the Axios-Loudias-Haliacmon Delta National Park.

Many kinds of birds have been observed in Haliacmon's region. They use it for accommodation and overwintering, like the ducks, or to rest on their long migratory journey. There have been observed 215 kinds of birds and about ⅓ of them nest in the region. Over 10% of the birds are endangered. They include Dalmatian pelican and curlew, that are considered to be among the rarest birds in the world. 27 kinds of rare and protected kinds of birds nest in the region, like purple heron.

== History ==
In antiquity, Claudius Ptolemy called the chain of mountains in which the river rises (northern Pindus) the Canalovii. According to Julius Caesar, the Haliacmon formed the line of demarcation between Macedon and Thessaly. In the upper part of its course it took a southeast direction through Elimiotis, which it watered; and then, continuing to the northeast, formed the boundary between Pieria, Eordaea, and Imathia. In the time of Herodotus the Haliacmon was apparently joined by the Loudias 7, 127, the discharge of the lake of Pella; but a change has taken place in the course of the Loudias, which no longer joins the Haliacmon, but flows directly into the Aegean Sea. The image below shows a wind gap between the Haliacmon and Loudias watersheds that is the probable ancient course of the Haliacmon.

It was the domain of the eponymous river god Haliacmon.

== Gallery ==
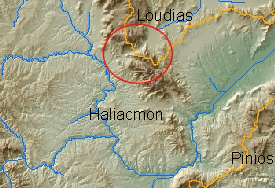
GIS map of Aliacmon

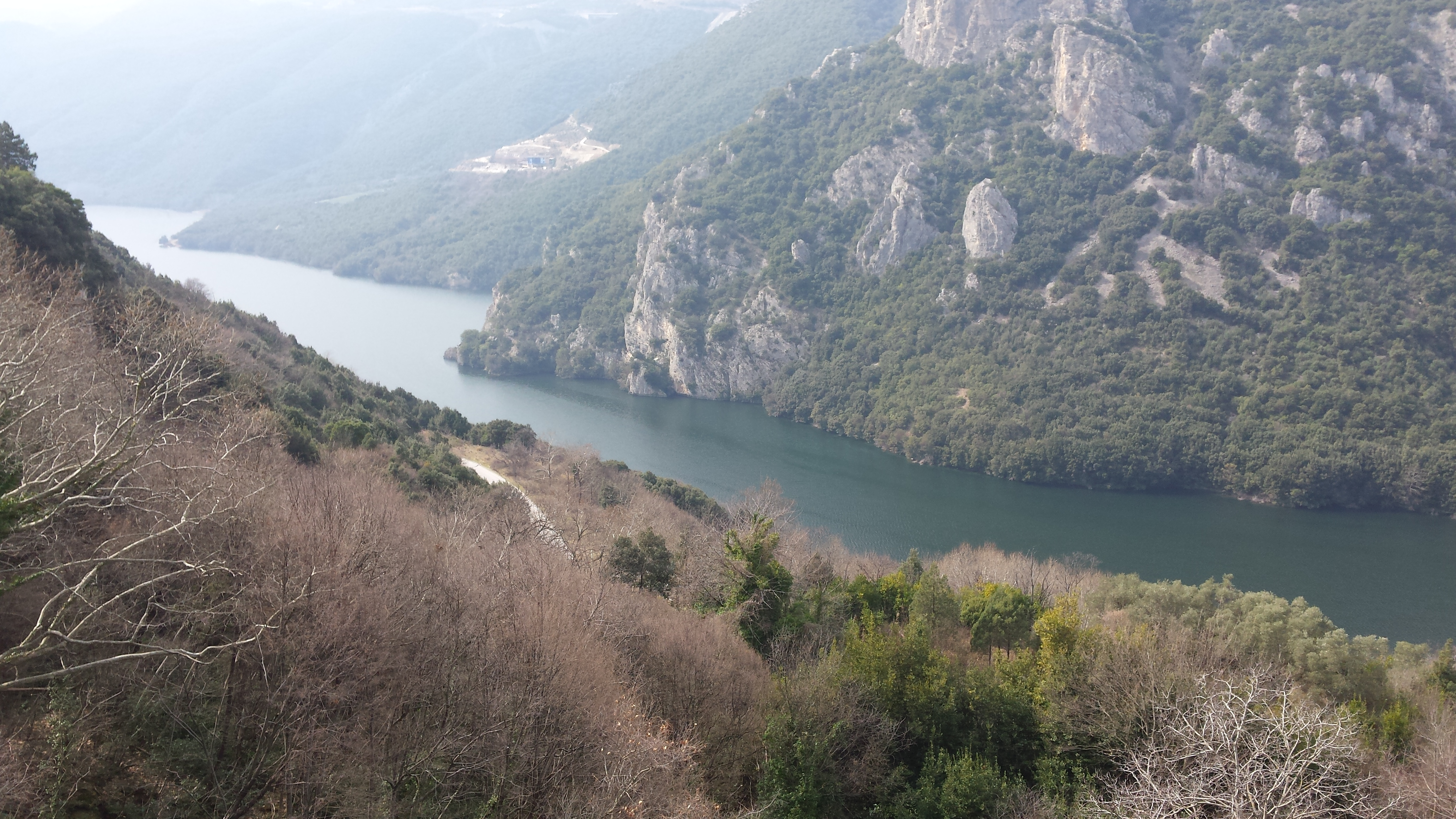
View from above

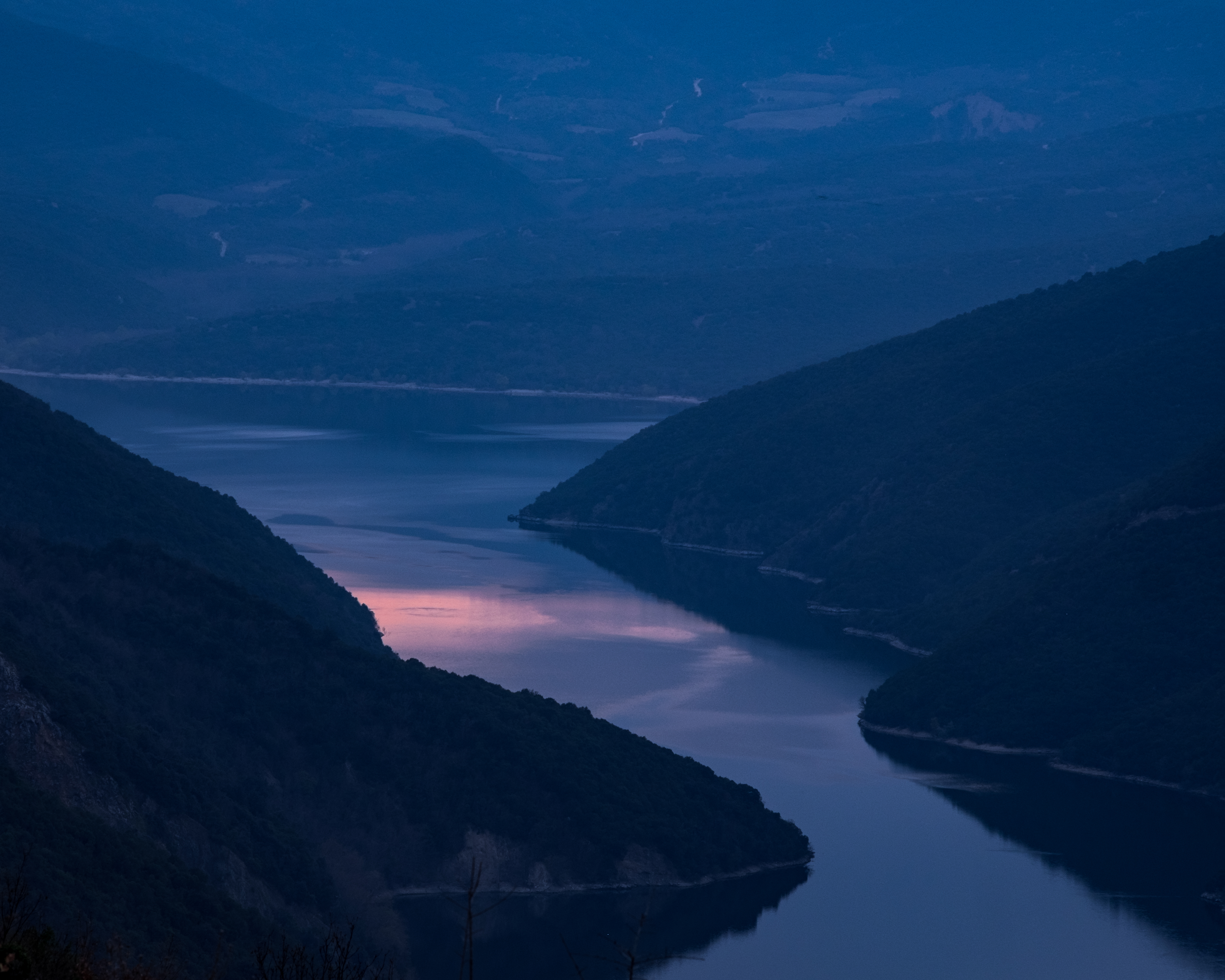
The river near Sfikia
