= Koilada, Kozani =

Koilada Κοιλάδα
- Community
- Location within Greece
- Coordinates: 40°21.5′N 21°55.5′E
- Country: Greece
- Administrative region: West Macedonia
- Regional unit: Kozani
- Municipality: Kozani
- Municipal unit: Ellispontos

Area
  - Community: 21.416 km^{2} (8.269 sq mi)
- Elevation: 674 m (2,211 ft)

Population (2021)
  - Community: 479
  - Density: 22.4/km^{2} (57.9/sq mi)
- Time zone: UTC+2 (EET)
  - Summer (DST): UTC+3 (EEST)
- Postal code: 501 50
- Area code: +30-2461
- Vehicle registration: ΚΖ

Koilada (Greek: Κοιλάδα) is a village and a community of the Kozani municipality. Before the 2011 local government reform it was part of the municipality of Ellispontos, of which it was a municipal district. The 2021 census recorded 479 inhabitants in the community of Koilada. The community of Koilada covers an area of 21.416 km^{2}.

== Administrative division ==
The community of Koilada consists of three separate settlements:

- Koilada (population 242 in 2021)
- Kremasti (population 61)
- Thymaria (population 176)

== See also ==
- List of settlements in the Kozani regional unit
