= Brazilian Marine Corps =

Land-combat branch of the Brazilian Navy

- Corpo de Fuzileiros Navais
- The seal of the Brazilian Marine Corps
- Founded: 7 March 1808; 218 years ago
- Country: Brazil
- Branch: Brazilian Navy
- Size: 16,000 (2024)
- Part of: Navy Command (administrative sector), Naval Operations Command (operational sector)
- General-Command HQ: Rio de Janeiro, Brazil
- Nickname: CFN
- Patron: Admiral Sílvio de Camargo
- Motto: Adsumus (English: Here we are)

Commanders
- Commandant General of the Marine Corps (Note: The General Command is the highest organ in the CFN's technical-administrative sector, which is distinct from the operational sector. It does not command the FFE, Marine Groups or Riverine Operations Battalions.): Admiral Carlos Chagas Vianna Braga

Insignia
- Flag

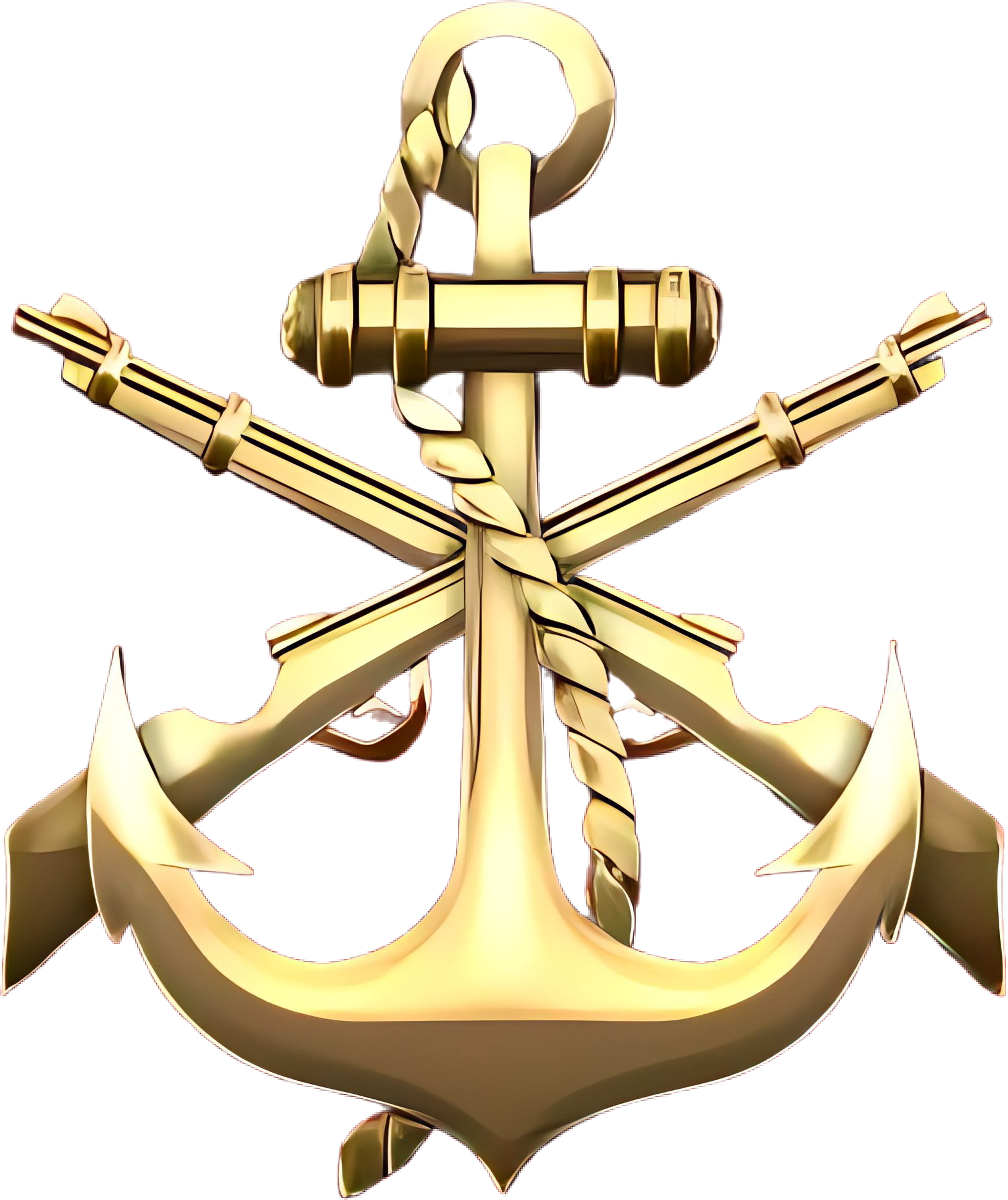
- Emblem

The Brazilian Marine Corps (Brazilian Portuguese: Corpo de Fuzileiros Navais, CFN; lit. 'Corps of Naval Fusiliers' or 'Corps of Naval Riflemen') is the Brazilian Navy's naval infantry component. Its operational components are the Fleet Marine Force (Força de Fuzileiros da Esquadra, FFE), under the Naval Operations Command, in Rio de Janeiro, and regional battalions under the Naval Districts in the coast and the Amazon and Platine basins. Its seagoing component is the FFE, with a core of three infantry battalions and its own artillery, amphibious and land armor, special operations forces and other support elements.

Tracing their origins to the Portuguese Navy's Royal Brigade of the Navy, Brazilian marines served across the 19th century aboard and landed from the Imperial Navy's ships. By the next century, they were relegated to guard duty and largely influenced by the Brazilian Army. In political struggles, they were usually loyalists. Only after 1950 did the CFN acquire true amphibious warfare capabilities, under long-lasting inspiration from the United States Marine Corps.

The CFN relies on the fleet and Naval Aviation for mobility. Its amphibious capability varies historically according to the fleet's available ships and attention given to other priorities, such as counterinsurgency during the military dictatorship and law and order in the current political order. Participation in United Nations peacekeeping is frequent and the 2008 Brazilian National Defense Strategy established that the Marine Corps must be a high-readiness expeditionary force for power projection by the navy. In Brazil's strategic surroundings, this means a capability for urban operations, from humanitarian aid to war, in crisis-ridden countries.

As a cadre of personnel, the Marine Corps is one of the navy's three main components, alongside the Fleet and Logistics Corps, and its ranks are named almost the same as the others. As officers, marines may rise to the highest peacetime rank. Marines are a professional, all-volunteer cadre which undergoes a cycle of military exercises with amphibious assaults (Operation Dragão) and live fire on land (Operation Formosa). They have a distinctive identity tied to both the sea and land and comparable to the army's infantry.

== History ==
=== Origins ===
The Brazilian Marine Corps' official history dates back to the transfer of the Portuguese court to Brazil in 1807, making it the oldest force of marines in Latin America. The Anglo-Portuguese squadron that transported the court to Brazil also brought along the Portuguese Navy's Royal Marine Brigade (Brigada Real de Marinha), a corps of naval infantry. The corps, founded in 1797, was divided into infantry, artillery and engineer units and is the predecessor to the modern-day Portuguese Marine Corps. Earlier during the 17th century, Portuguese marines of the Terço da Armada da Coroa de Portugal had fought in Brazil against the invasions of the Dutch West India Company, conducting amphibious landings during the 1625 recapture of Bahia.

In April 1809, the Royal Marine Brigade participated in the Portuguese conquest of French Guiana, which the CFN considers to be its baptism of fire, even though the marines were Portuguese. 550 marines of the Brigade embarked on a four-ship Portuguese Navy squadron at Rio de Janeiro, which set sail for Cayenne and arrived there on 6 April. The marines landed on the beaches near Cayenne and advanced into the colony, which capitulated on 14 April. Upon returning to Rio, the marines were stationed at the Fortress of São José at Cobras Island, which is the modern-day headquarters of the CFN. The Royal Marine Brigade subsequently participated in the first Banda Oriental invasion, second Banda Oriental invasion and Pernambucan revolution.

When John VI of Portugal returned to Lisbon in 1821, he left a unit of the Royal Marine Brigade, the Battalion of Fusilier-Sailors (Batalhão de Fuzileiros-Marinheiros), in Rio. Serving under Pedro, Prince Regent, the unit fought for the Brazilians during the Brazilian War of Independence, carrying out amphibious landings and artillery bombardments against Portuguese forces.

=== Imperial Brazil ===
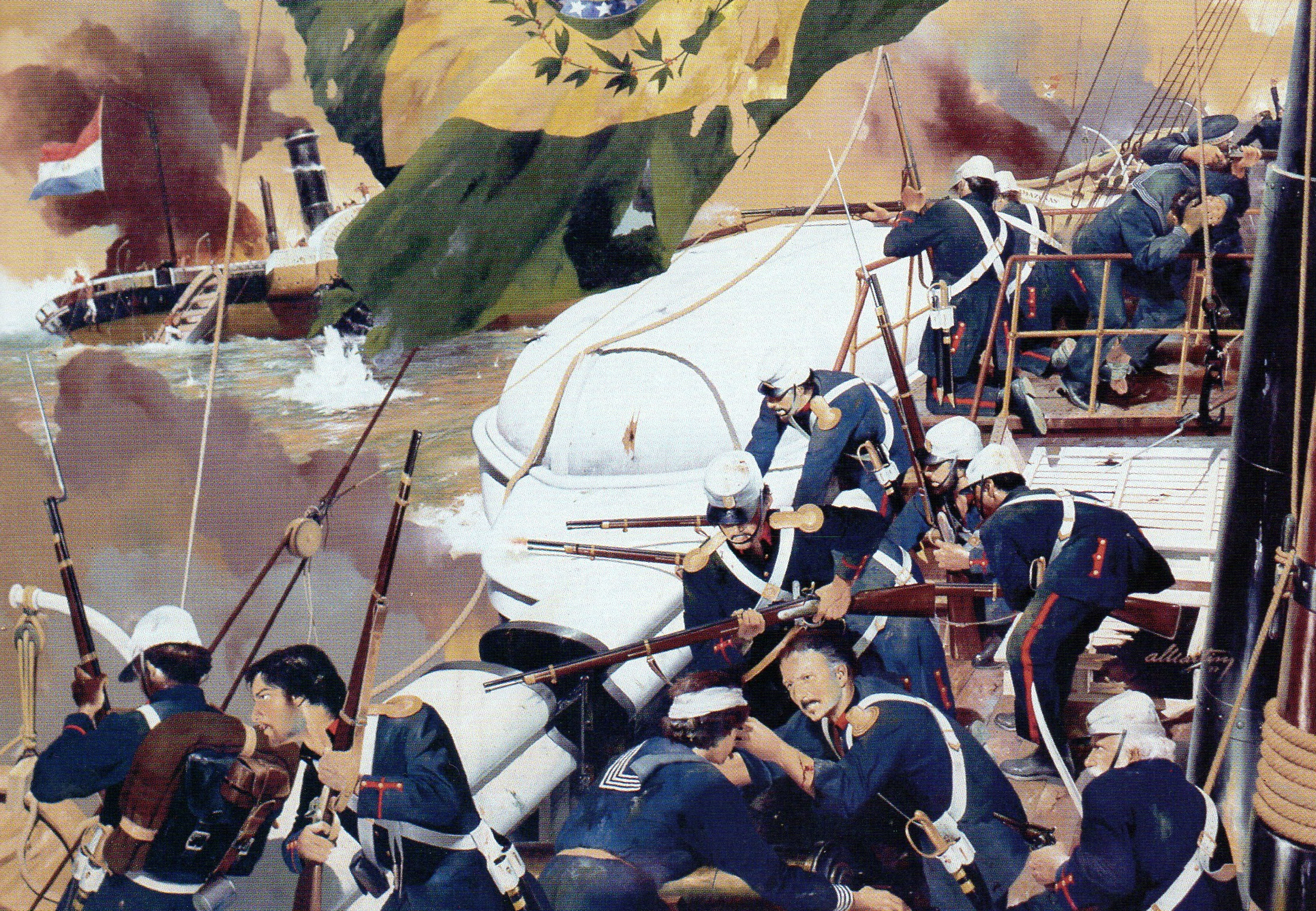
Brazilian marines at the Battle of Riachuelo in 1865

Shortly after Brazil's independence in 1822, the Battalion of Fusilier-Sailors was renamed the Rio de Janeiro Artillery Battalion of the Navy (Batalhão de Artilharia da Marinha do Rio de Janeiro). In this early phase, the CFN was a naval artillery corps, later named Imperial Navy Artillery Brigade (Imperial Brigada de Artilharia de Marinha, 1826) and Navy Artillery Corps (Corpo de Artilharia de Marinha, 1827). This was one of the Imperial Brazilian Navy's cadres of personnel, alongside the Fleet Corps (Corpo da Armada), and the only properly militarized cadre. Its commander was an army artillery officer, who was also given command of the Fortress of São José. Military campaigns were largely maritime, owing to the difficulty of transport by land. Throughout the tumultuous regency period (1831–1840), the Navy Artillery Corps was deployed against internal revolts and was itself behind one of them, on 6 October 1831, leading to the bombing of Cobras Island by the fleet and its occupation by the army and National Guard.

The force was renamed Corps of Naval Fusiliers (Corpo de Fuzileiros Navais, 1847), later Naval Battalion (Batalhão Naval, 1852), and converted into naval infantry. Its personnel was drawn from the Artillery Corps and officers of the Fleet Corps in commission. In 1852 it comprised 64 officers and 1,216 enlisted personnel in eight companies of riflemen and two artillery batteries. Total strength was small compared to the Army.

Internal stability during emperor Pedro II's reign, from 1840 onward, directed military operations towards international conflicts in the Platine basin. Marines enforced crew discipline, captured and garrisoned forts and patrolled rivers in small boats during the Platine, Uruguayan, and Paraguayan Wars. In the Battle of Riachuelo (1865), they fought enemy boarding parties in close combat. Two years later, they built a five mile long rail line across the Paraguayan Chaco. The CFN's current three infantry battalions are named after battles in this period (Riachuelo, Humaitá and Paissandu battalions), as well as the Special Operations Battalion (Tonelero battalion).

361 marines were killed in action during this period. After the Paraguayan War, the 1870s and 1880s saw no combat and total strength fell to 900 personnel. Marines were assigned to guard duty in naval facilities and internal order operations, such as the control of popular unrest in the Vintém Riots (1879–1880). Previously in 1864 they had already repressed striking port workers in Santos. On 15 November 1889, 400 marines joined army forces to proclaim the Republic.

=== First Republic ===
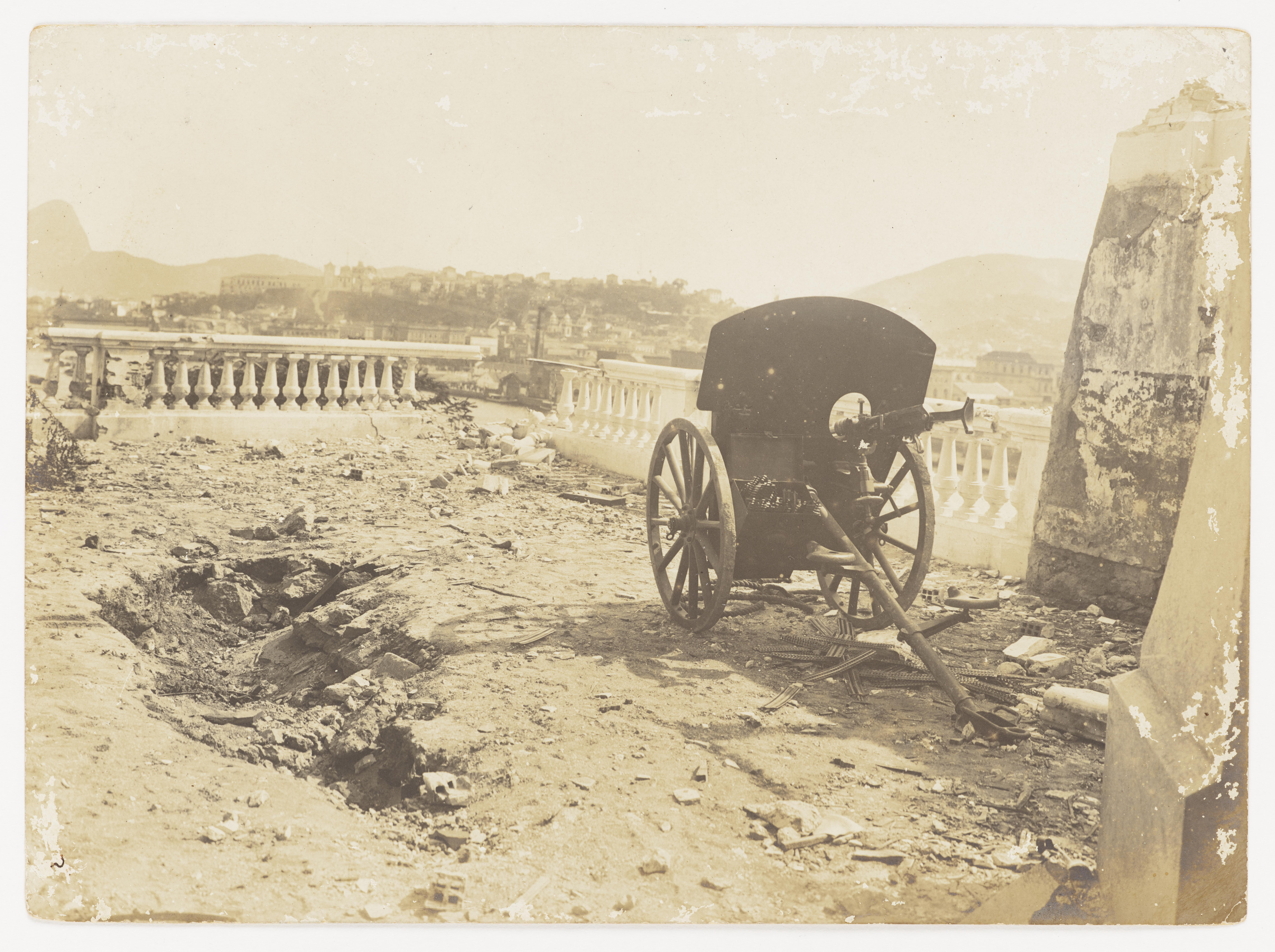
Naval Battalion machine gun in the aftermath of the 1910 revolt

The early republican crisis found the Naval Battalion aligned with the rest of the navy against the government of president Floriano Peixoto. Its participation in the second Naval Revolt (1893–1895) concluded with the Fortress of São José destroyed by loyalist bombings and the battalion disbanded by the victorious government. Amnesty in 1895 allowed the navy to reorganize the force with 216 well-behaved enlisted men from the former battalion and 184 army soldiers. The new unit was named Navy Infantry Corps (Corpo de Infantaria de Marinha) until 1908, when it once again became the Naval Battalion. Os Fuzileiros Navais na história do Brasil (2008), a semi-official history of the Corps, (Note: The work is aimed at a broader public than the military itself, but although it was "signed by a civilian scholar, Alba Carneiro Bielinski, in reality it was an institutional commission. The CFN's official coat of arms is in the cover. [She] is a kind of “house historian”".) asserts that by this period "the Battalion was deemed, by public consensus, the most correct and well-drilled of all battalions in the Rio de Janeiro garrison".

Sailors and marines had completely distinct roles, and the latter, when on ship duty, would be responsible for repressing the former. Social backgrounds and discipline regulations, on the other hand, were equivalent. Days after the sailors' 1910 Revolt of the Lash, a rumor spread among marines that the abolition of corporal punishment achieved by the revolt would not apply to them. On 9 December, part of the enlisted contingent took up arms and occupied their quarters. This uprising was isolated and easily crushed, leaving 26 marines dead, many expelled and serious damages to the Fortress of São José — "the near extinction of another generation of marines", according to CFN historian Manoel Caetano Silva. The Corps does not pay homage to any of the rebels, but has never again used the lash to enforce discipline.

Traditionally, marines were loyal to their commanders-in-chief. The Artur Bernardes government, facing numerous tenentist military revolts, converted the battalion into the Naval Regiment (Regimento Naval) in 1924, increasing its strength from 600 to 1,500 men. Enlisted personnel were mostly from Northern and Northeastern Brazil. Recruits from Rio de Janeiro were blamed for high desertion rates and ceased to be the majority after 1910. The drought-stricken Northeast was a source of labor for Rio de Janeiro and other Southeastern states. The uniforms, employment, housing and authority drew volunteers to the Corps, but many requested to leave when they found rigorous discipline and a demanding routine.

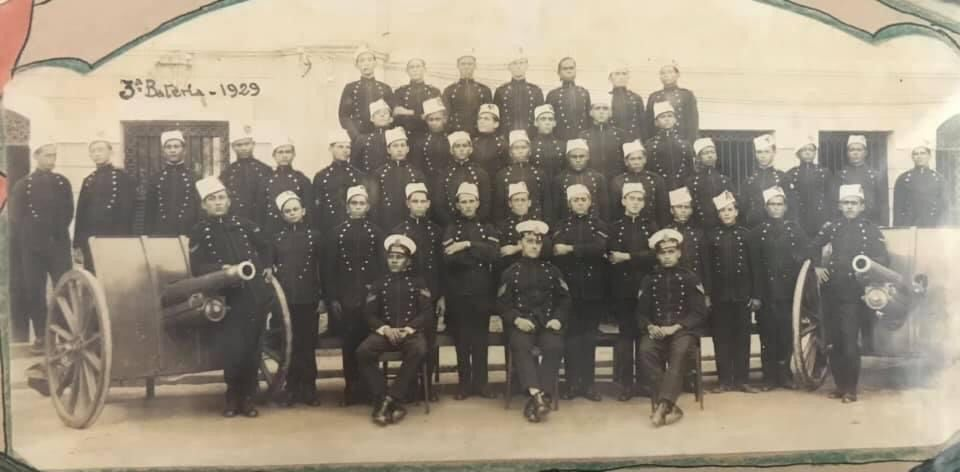
3rd Artillery Battery of the Naval Regiment in 1929

There were no marine officers at the time. The Naval Battalion was commanded by officers of the Fleet Corps, instructed at the Naval Academy, and technical services were rendered by Fleet non-commissioned officers. The 1924 reform made possible, for the first time, the promotion of enlisted marines to officer rank. Lacking education at the Naval Academy and coming from lower social backgrounds, they were deemed second-rate officers by the Fleet. The Naval Regiment as a whole was seen as a guard force and not an elite.

During the Revolution of 1930 marines were attached to army columns and once again defended the established government — at the moment, that of Washington Luís. After his overthrow by a military coup in the capital, marines previously taken prisoner in Santa Catarina made their way back as part of the victorious revolutionary armies. On 30 October the Naval Regiment paraded in Rio de Janeiro showing its loyalty to the new government.

=== Vargas Era ===
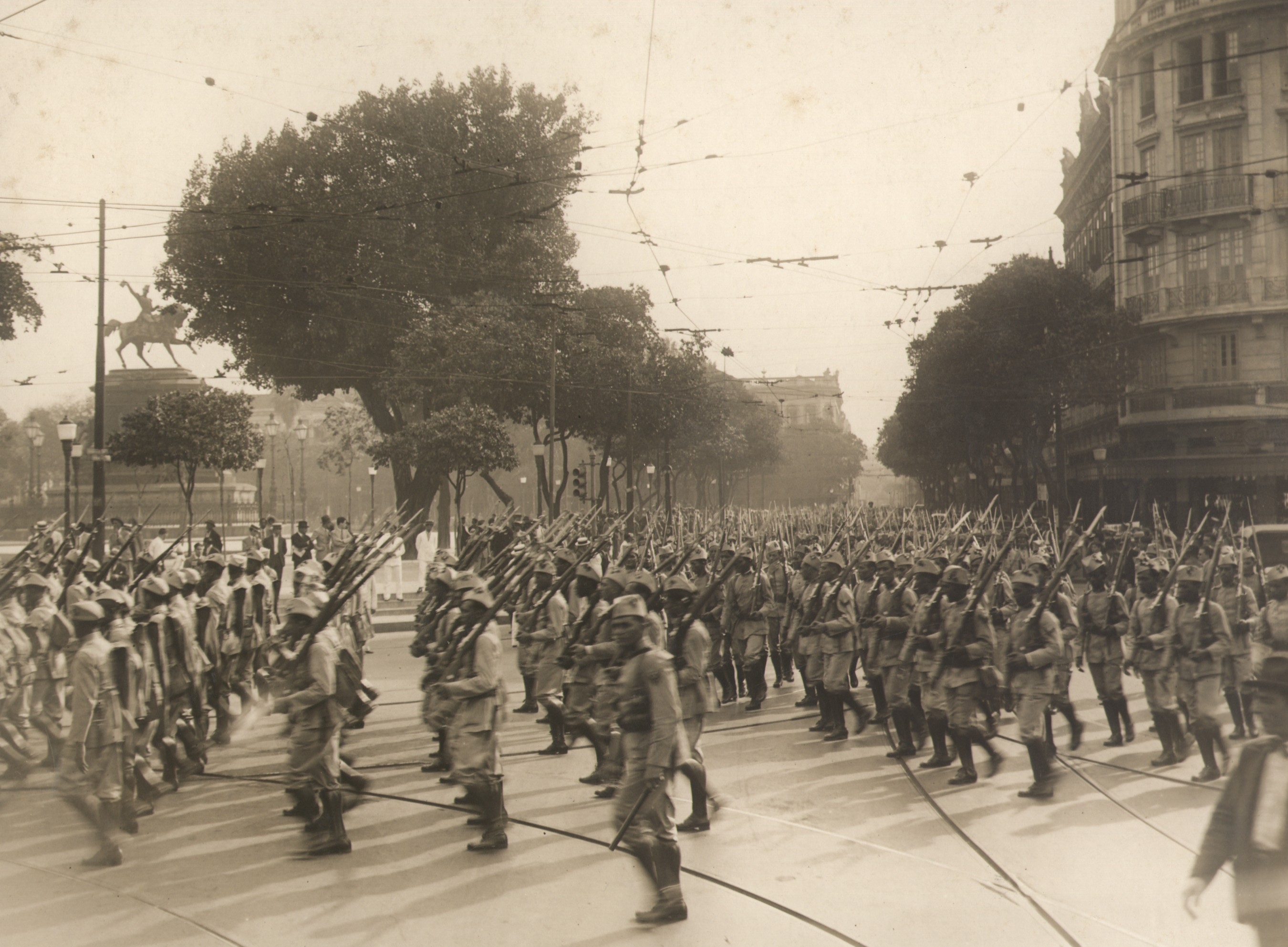
Parade in Rio de Janeiro during the 1932 revolution

Among the Getúlio Vargas government's military reforms, on 29 February 1932 the Naval Regiment received its current designation (Corps of Naval Fusiliers), with an authorized strength of 2,524 men. Professionalization was sought in the army's Officer Improvement School (EsAO) and Infantry Sergeant School (ESI); EsAO's course would be mandatory for CFN captain lieutenants until 1990. These officers, starting on 1937, began their careers in the Naval Academy just as their peers in the Fleet Corps. NCOs would only reach officer rank through the Marine Auxiliary Cadre (Quadro Auxiliar de Fuzileiros Navais).

In defense of Vargas' government, marines fought against the Constitutionalist Revolution of 1932 and the Communist (1935) and Integralist (1938) uprisings. In 1932, some landed in Parati to maneuver on the right flank of the constitutionalists, while others served aboard the blockade fleet in São Paulo's coastline. Marines were gaining political, strategic and even social prominence. Although seen as a reserved and focused soldiery, their military band was successful in public and in the radio in the 40s. In two paintings by Alberto da Veiga Guignard, Os noivos ('Bride and groom', 1937) and A família do fuzileiro naval ('The marine's family', 1938), the uniform was depicted as a point of pride for Afro-Brazilian families.

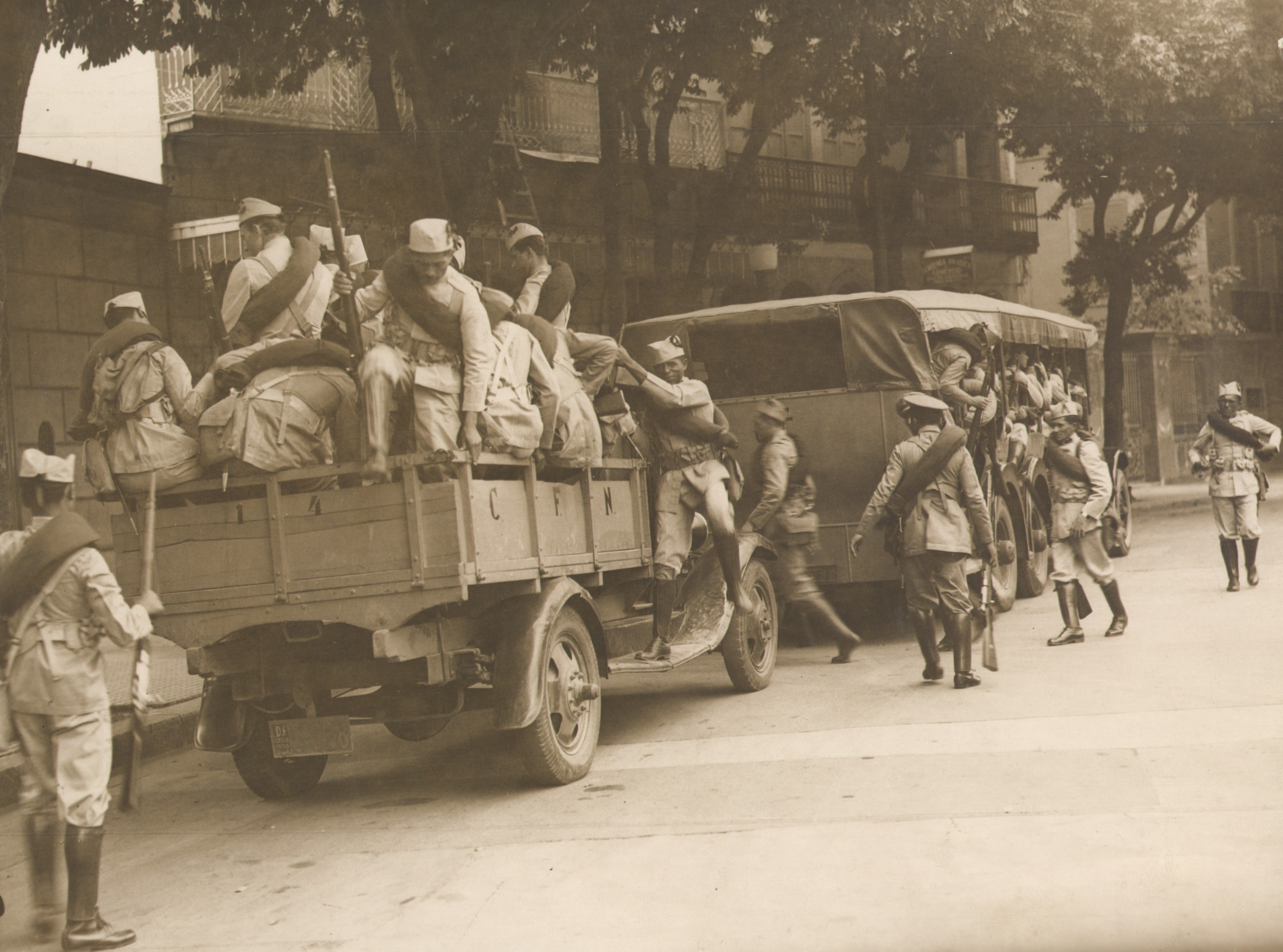
Defense of the presidential palace during the 1935 Communist uprising

The first CFN bases outside of Rio de Janeiro were installed in 1932: the 1st and 2nd Regional Companies, in Ladário and Belém. Additional companies were installed in Natal, Salvador and Recife for coast defense during World War II. A detachment was posted at Trindade Island and marines served on ship duty aboard the Northeastern Naval Force. When the need to garrison the archipelago of Fernando de Noronha arose, some officers proposed a detachment of marines, but the navy had no means to provide it.

Admiral Alberto Lemos Bastos complained in 1943 that "a marine must be a specialist in landing operations. Ours have never practiced such things, nor have the means needed to do them and have not wanted to have them. They have no armament, nor tents, nor field kitchens". The 1932 Corps regulation had listed landing operations as the very first item in the CFN's roles. In reality, there was no dedicated equipment for amphibious operations, and the prevailing military doctrine came from the army. Small boats were used to move ashore in some exercises, but the situation constrained marines to a focus on internal security. According to an official history, only in the second half of the century would the Corps cease to be a poorly armed guard and ceremonial force.

=== Fourth Republic ===
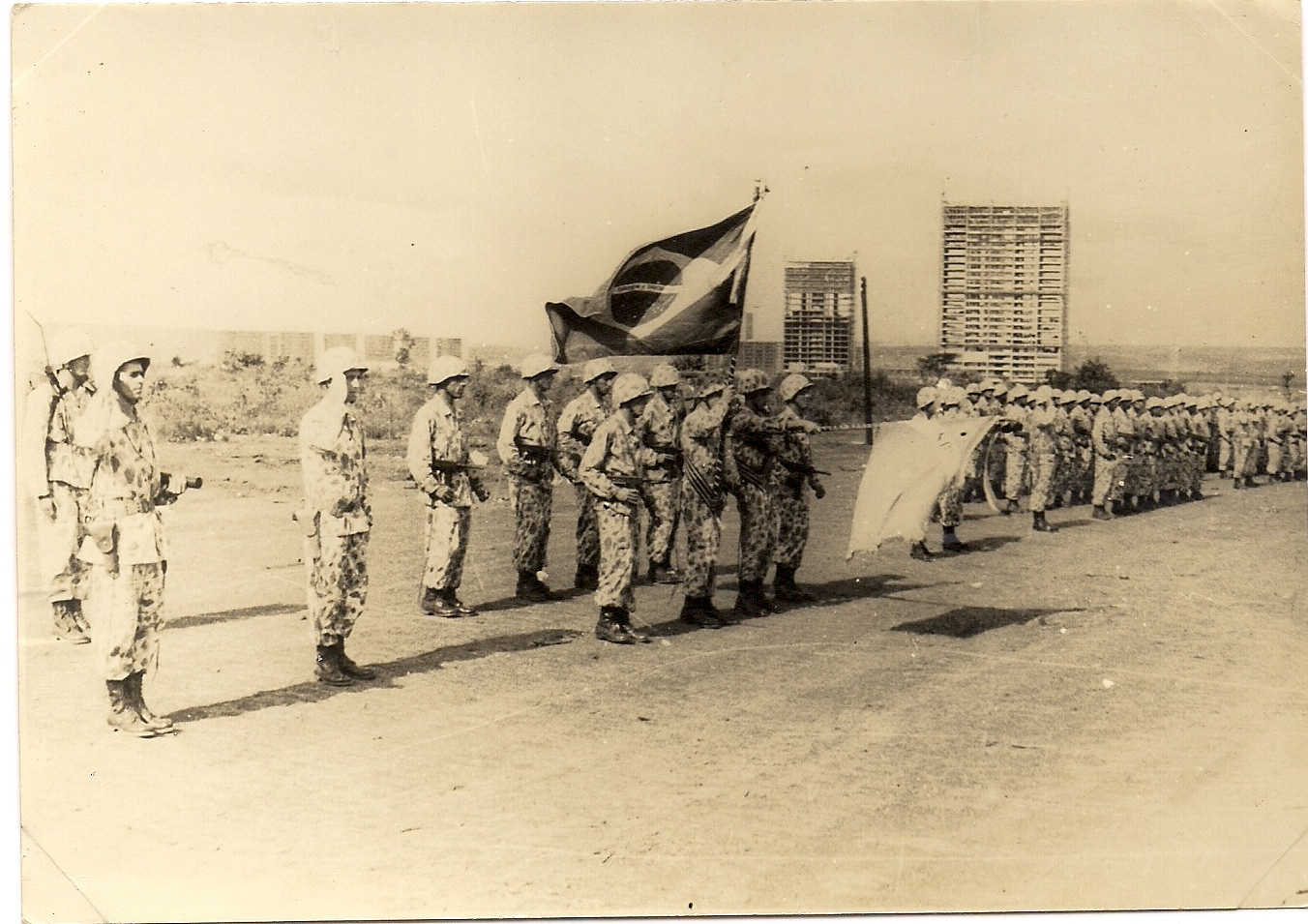
Operation Alvorada: a detachment attends the inauguration of Brasília in 1960

The CFN's 1950 regulation determined that it would have "primary responsibility on the development of doctrine, tactics and material for amphibious operations". It echoed the strong postwar American influence on the Navy and the impression made by amphibious assaults in the course of the war. The regulation may have been detached from reality in that year, but by 1958 the Corps held its first amphibious exercises, operations Aragem and Badejo. The material condition for this change was the purchase of transport ships (the Custódio de Mello class) and landing craft for the fleet, from 1955 onward.

1955 also brought a new personnel law authorizing a numerical expansion from 4,412 (the 1947 level) to 10 thousand men. Enlisted marines had minor rivalries with sailors and stewards, distinguished themselves in the Navy by their fitness and skill with the rifle and only embarked sporadically. In 1957 the Navy organized the Fleet Marine Force (Força de Fuzileiros da Esquadra, FFE), which would reach its present complement of three infantry battalions by the end of the following decade. (Note: Precursors to the 1st (Riachuelo), 2nd (Humaitá) and 3rd (Paissandu) Infantry Battalions were respectively organized in 1958, 1965 and 1969. Engineering (1958), artillery (1962) and logistics (1965) components also trace their roots to this era.)

Brazilian officers were sent to study at the United States Marine Corps (USMC) and returned as instructors at the Naval Academy and Naval War School. USMC landing doctrine and Brazilian Army influences were now the two major components of CFN thought, without either of them nullifying the other. The USMC model, battle-proven and embodied by well-equipped and qualified combatants, opened a gap between doctrine and capabilities when transposed to Brazilian conditions. For lack of experience and equipment, it was presumed that any war would be fought with the United States as an ally and provider of equipment. The CFN would ultimately have to be an USMC reserve.

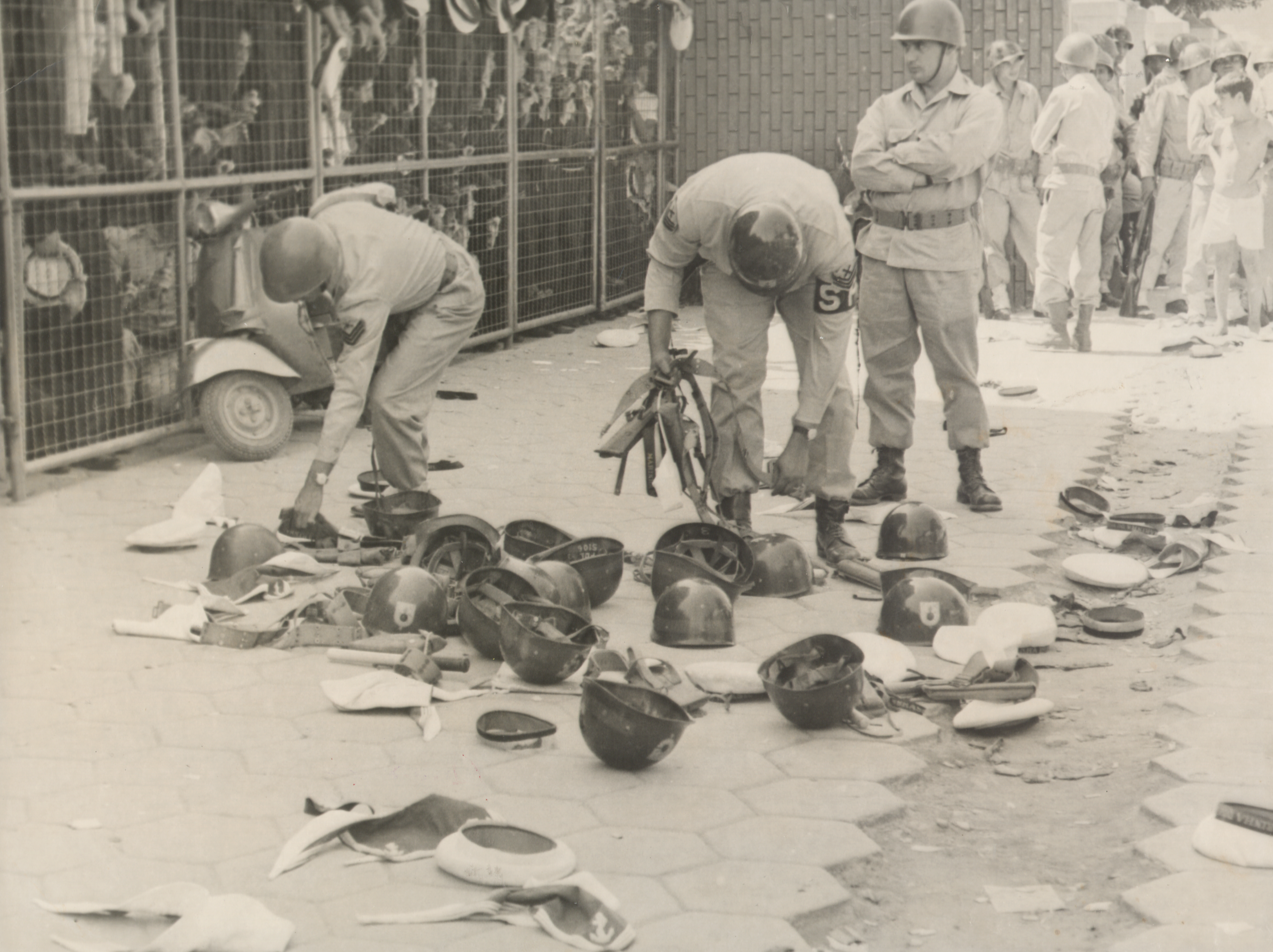
Privates abandon their weapons and join mutinous marines at the Metalworkers' Union building in March 1964

Differences in economic development between the United States and Brazil meant differences in the concept of security. This can be seen in some peculiar tasks assigned to a detachment at Uruguaiana, on the riverine border with Argentina, in 1948: to patrol the Uruguay River, repress smuggling and oversee river traffic. The Brasília Marine Group, created in 1961, had cooperation with the FFE among its missions, but also territorial defense and internal security. The country's two main port cities, Rio de Janeiro and Santos, received marine groups in 1963, in the heat of the national political crisis.

When Navy minister Sílvio Heck attempted to veto João Goulart's accession to the Presidency in 1961, marines almost landed in coastal Santa Catarina as part of Operation Abelha. Marines in Brasília took arms in the August 1963 Sergeants' Revolt. In the spiral of radicalization until the 1964 coup d'état, president Goulart had on his side the "red admiral" Cândido Aragão, commander of the CFN, popular with the left and barely tolerated by the officer corps, as well as corporals and privates in the Association of Sailors and Marines of Brazil (Associação dos Marinheiros e Fuzileiros Navais do Brasil, AMFNB), protagonists of the 1964 Sailors' Revolt. When other marines were sent to quell the mutiny, they dropped their weapons and defected.

=== Military dictatorship ===
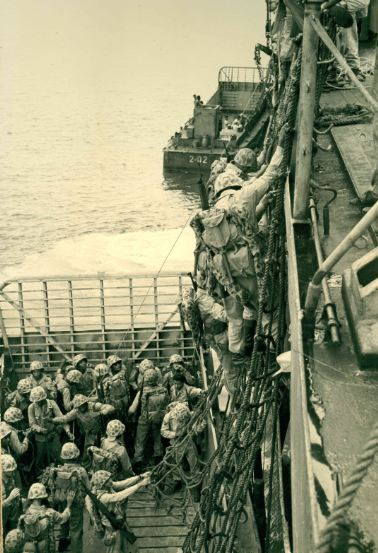
Transhipment of personnel from their transport ship to landing craft in Operation Dragão I (1964)

The Sailors' revolt was an immediate factor to the coup d'état, in the course of which Aragão and the AMFNB offered the most significant loyalist resistance in Rio de Janeiro. Goulart fell and vice admiral Augusto Rademaker, chief of the "Navy Revolutionary Command", named rear admiral Heitor Lopes de Souza to the CFN's General Command in the course of the coup. This officer had been transferred from the Fleet Corps and served in his new post until 1971 as a politically reliable asset of the regime's military presidents. Marines associated with the fallen government were purged. Aragão became a taboo. The official gallery of general-commanders of the Corps, published at the 2008 bicentennial, excludes him from the list, leaving a gap between December 1963 and March 1964.

The first peacekeeping operation by the Corps was in 1965–1966, as a detachment within the US-led Inter-American Peace Force in the Dominican Republic. The Brazilian contribution was part of president Castelo Branco's pro-American foreign policy. Leading names in the operation had been oppositionist figures in the previous government.

In the domestic theater, presumed roles were set by the political situation: land operations would follow the Army's doctrine on "revolutionary war", while amphibious landings would be on national shores against territories held by guerrillas or rebel troops. The Corps established a specialized unconventional warfare unit, the Marine Special Operations Battalion, and took part in extinguishing the Araguaia Guerrilla War. The National Truth Commission identified the Flores Island Marine Base as a site of detention and torture of political prisoners between 1969 and 1971.

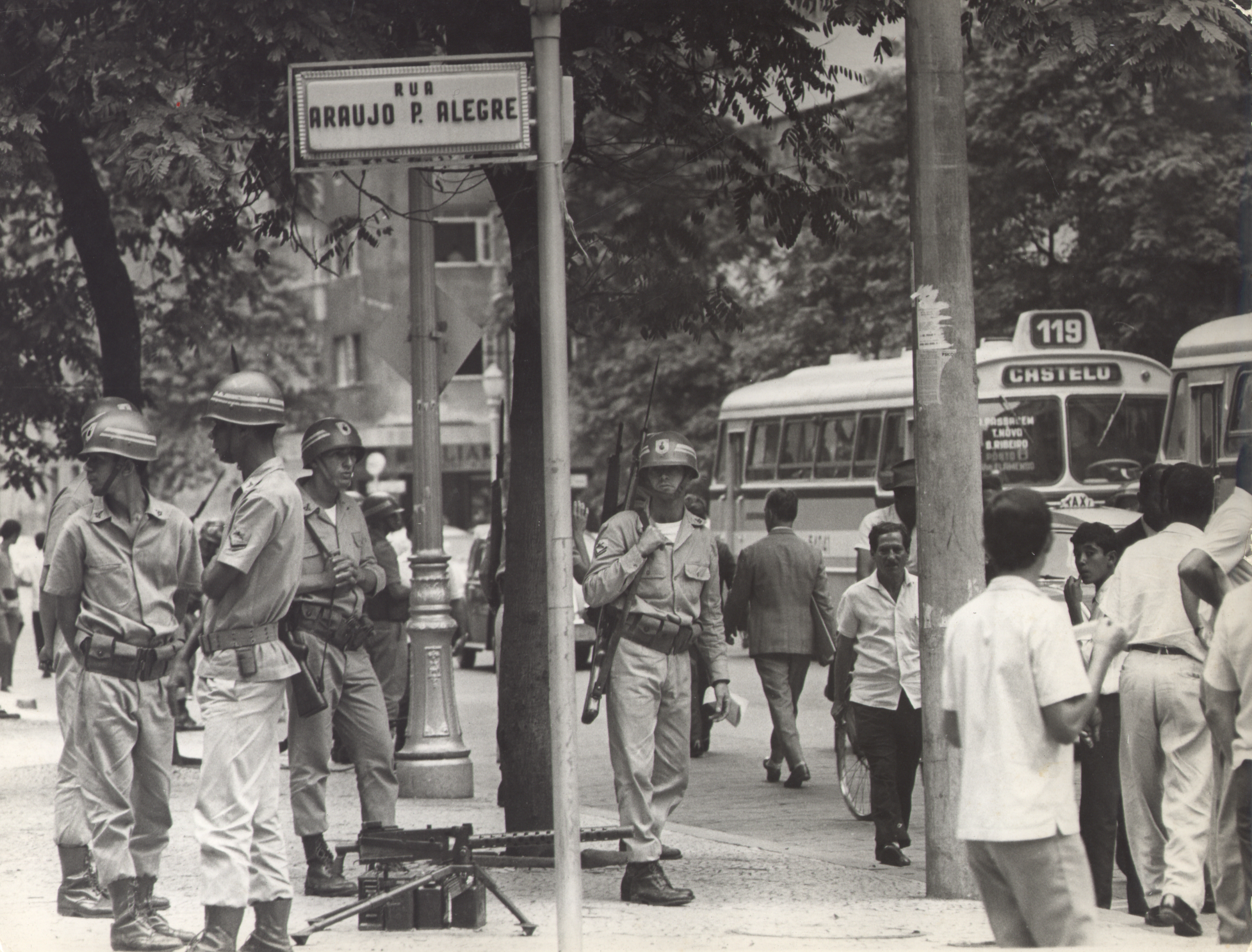
Public security operations during the protests of 1968

Although the "predominance of internal security issues and undesirable suspicions" hampered the "internal debate on the emphasis that should be given to amphibious exercises", by 1981 the amphibious doctrine was dominant, according to admiral Luiz Carlos da Silva Cantídio. Starting on 1964, amphibious exercises assumed greater proportions. The fleet commissioned new amphibious assault ships, Naval Aviation helicopters were integrated to the landings and the Corps received its first armored vehicles. At an authorized strength of 15,803 men in 1972, a level which would remain stable until the 21st century, the Corps had 25% of the Navy's men. Expansion was gradual, for lack of resources, and in the following year real strength was at circa 650 officers and 12,350 enlisted.

Joint "Veritas" operations in Puerto Rico maintained ties with the USMC. In 1973 an American intelligence report assessed: "by U.S. standards, the marines are moderately well trained and are in a fair state of readiness. They could conduct an amphibious landing with up to two battalions, if the necessary sealift, air, naval gunfire, and logistic support were available". The Fleet Marine Force was "a regimental landing team of about 3,000 men which provides a mobile amphibious force in readiness and is the nucleus of a marine amphibious division".

Operations Aragem and Arrastão tested, from 1977 to 1979, the ability to occupy port areas against hypothetical guerrilla actions, sabotage and civil unrest. In March 1980 the 1st Naval District's marines deployed to the Port of Santos during a port workers' strike. There were no arrests or confrontations with these workers, but the military presence tightened the government's pressure against the strike. Beyond the economic consequences of the port's shutdown, a rebirth of independent organized labor was not in the military government's ongoing plans for redemocratization. New "port security" operations were carried out in the 1985–1987 strikes, shortly after the military left power.

=== Sixth Republic ===
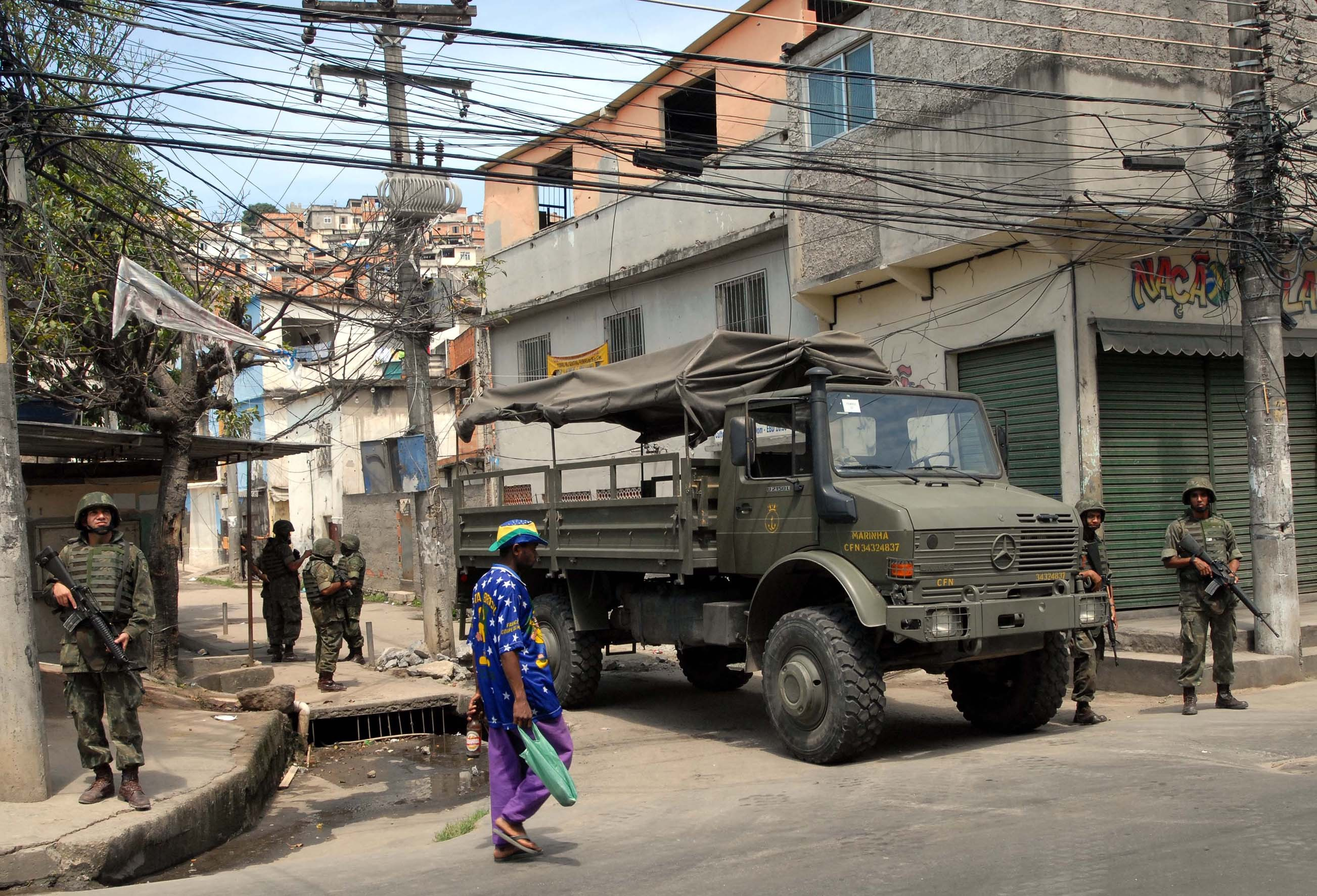
Occupation of the Complexo do Alemão (2008)

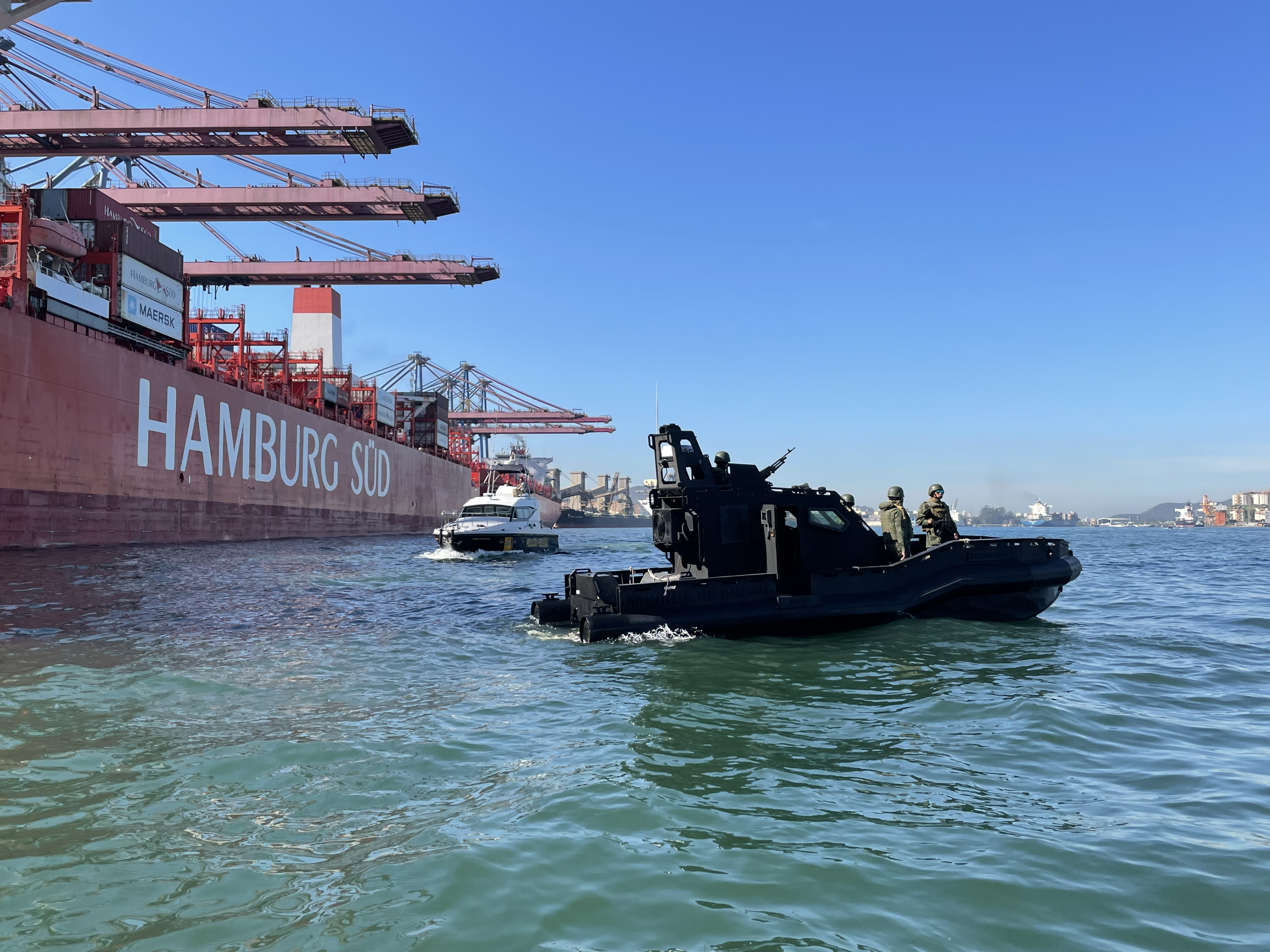
Naval patrol in the Port of Santos (2022)

By the end of the 20th century, the likelihood of amphibious operations in interstate warfare diminished, but amphibious forces had to adapt to a high rate of low-intensity conflicts and new threats such as terrorism, climatic disasters and transnational crime. In Brazil, concerns over the Amazon manifested in the Corps with a new type of unit, the Riverine Operations Battalion, first created in 2002. Marine observers and troops have been sent to a number of United Nations peacekeeping missions since 1989, and other missions by the Organization of American States. Starting with the 1994 "Operation Rio", marines have reinforced law enforcement agencies in Brazilian territory.

As one analyst at the International Defense Review observed in 1989, "Brazil's sizeable, well-trained Marine Corps lacks amphibious potential due to the navy's shortage of sea lift and assault craft. Its ability to launch amphibious operations, for example, on the West African coast, would be hindered by the lack of sea lift and also the navy's limited cross-oceanic reach". Around the turn of the century, budget restraints and ship decommissionings reduced the size and frequency of the Navy's amphibious exercises. Priorities were diverted to subsidiary actions and law and order operations. Within the 1988 Constitution's legal framework, public security deployments by the military happen at the request of civilian authorities.

Comparisons may be drawn between the 2006–2007 offensives against gangs by the United Nations Stabilisation Mission in Haiti and the "pacification" of Brazilian favelas controlled by organized crime, starting in 2008. Marine and Army troops were in both. In early stages, marine armored vehicles overcame obstacles dug by armed groups in the narrow alleys of Rio de Janeiro and Port-au-Prince. The use of force was measured: the vehicles were only used to protect the infantry. In later stages, the military's presence is transferred to permanent garrisons, in Rio's case, the Pacifying Police Units. As in the army, there are instances of weapons smuggled from their garrisons and reservists commissioned by criminal factions.

=== Modernization programs ===
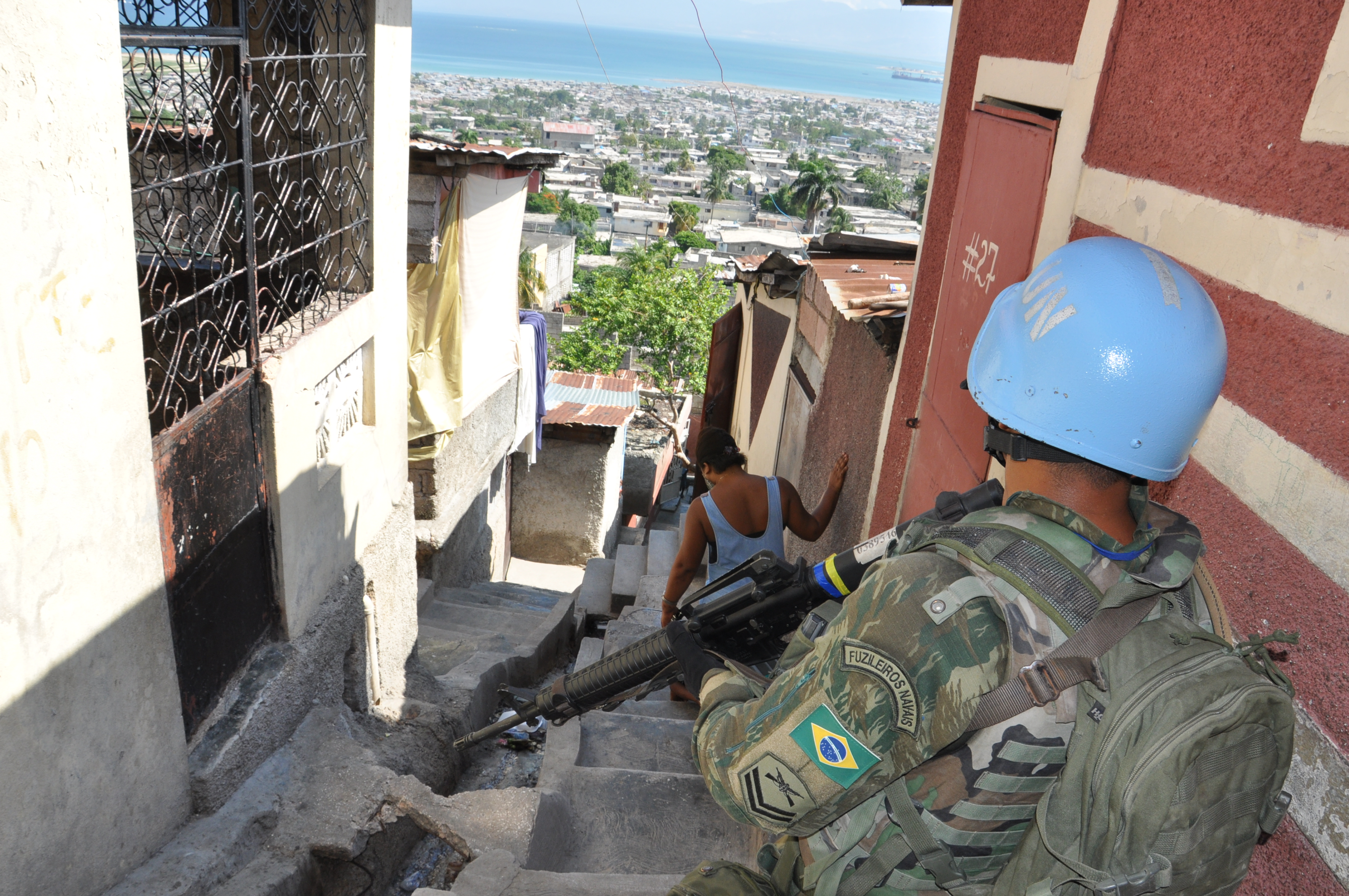
Peacekeeping deployment in Haiti

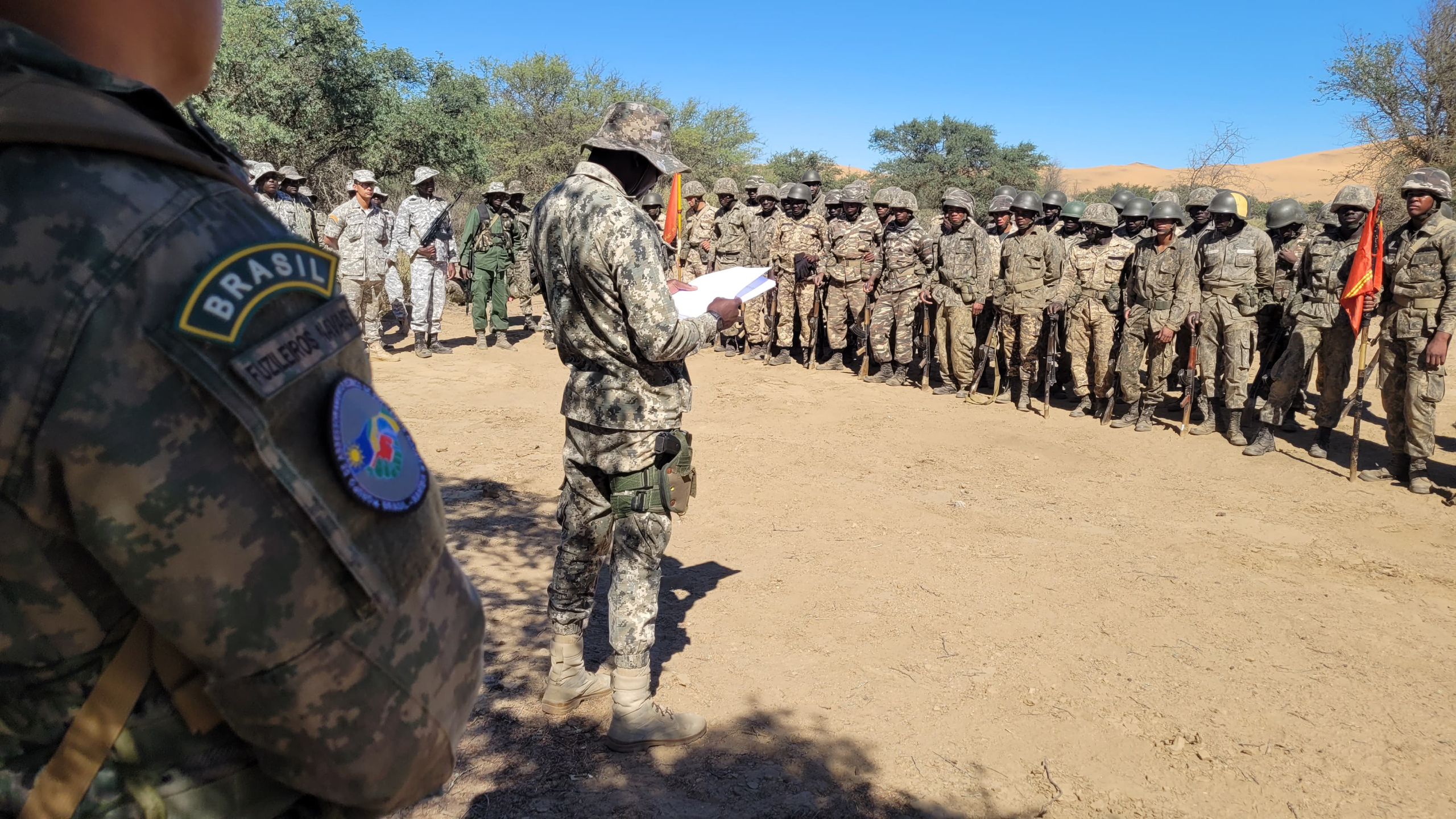
Technical advisory for the Namibian Marine Corps (2024)

The 2008 National Defense Strategy (Estratégia Nacional de Defesa, END) clarified the CFN's objectives: "to ensure its power projection capability, the Navy will possess marine assets in permanent readiness". The Marine Corps was to consolidate its role as "the premier expeditionary force", potentially deployed "anywhere in the world". Expeditionary missions, likely in developing states under political and social crisis in Brazil's strategic surroundings, mean the Corps must be ready for amphibious operations in urbanized coastlines.

The END oriented the Brazilian Navy's 2009 and 2013 Articulation and Equipment Plans (Planos de Articulação e Equipamento da Marinha do Brasil, PAEMB), which set targets for the CFN's expansion and re-equipment. One of them was a 2nd Fleet Marine Force headquartered in the Northern or Northeastern Region, alongside a 2nd Fleet. (Note: The 2nd Fleet/2nd Fleet Marine Force would prioritize defense of the Amazon Delta. Former Minister of the Navy Mário César Flores criticized this proposal, as marines can be redeployed; "what's needed is to provide the best conditions for the first, the one that exists.) An expansion in size to 20,666 marines by 2031 was approved in 2010, and a full execution of the PAEMB would require an even greater number (28,925). By the late 2030s, the Corps would be larger than the Uruguayan and Paraguayan armies. The mid-decade economic crisis and ensuing fiscal adjustments delayed these projects. The 2nd Fleet/2nd Fleet Marine Force was pushed to long-term planning (2030s or 2040s).

Amphibious exercises gradually recovered after the Bahia and Atlântico were commissioned in 2016 and 2018. By 2023, deliveries for the military's modernization programmes, including the CFN's, continued at a slow pace. One of these acquisitions, of twelve American Joint Light Tactical Vehicles (JTLV) for the Corps, was noted in the media for its aptitude in urban environments and therefore, law and order operations. According to a commentator in Le Monde diplomatique, this suggested the Navy's eyes were set on guerrillas, militias, cartels, gangs and other irregular enemies in the cities, and not the coastline, Amazon or Pantanal.

== Roles ==
Naval warfare, limited use of force and benign activities

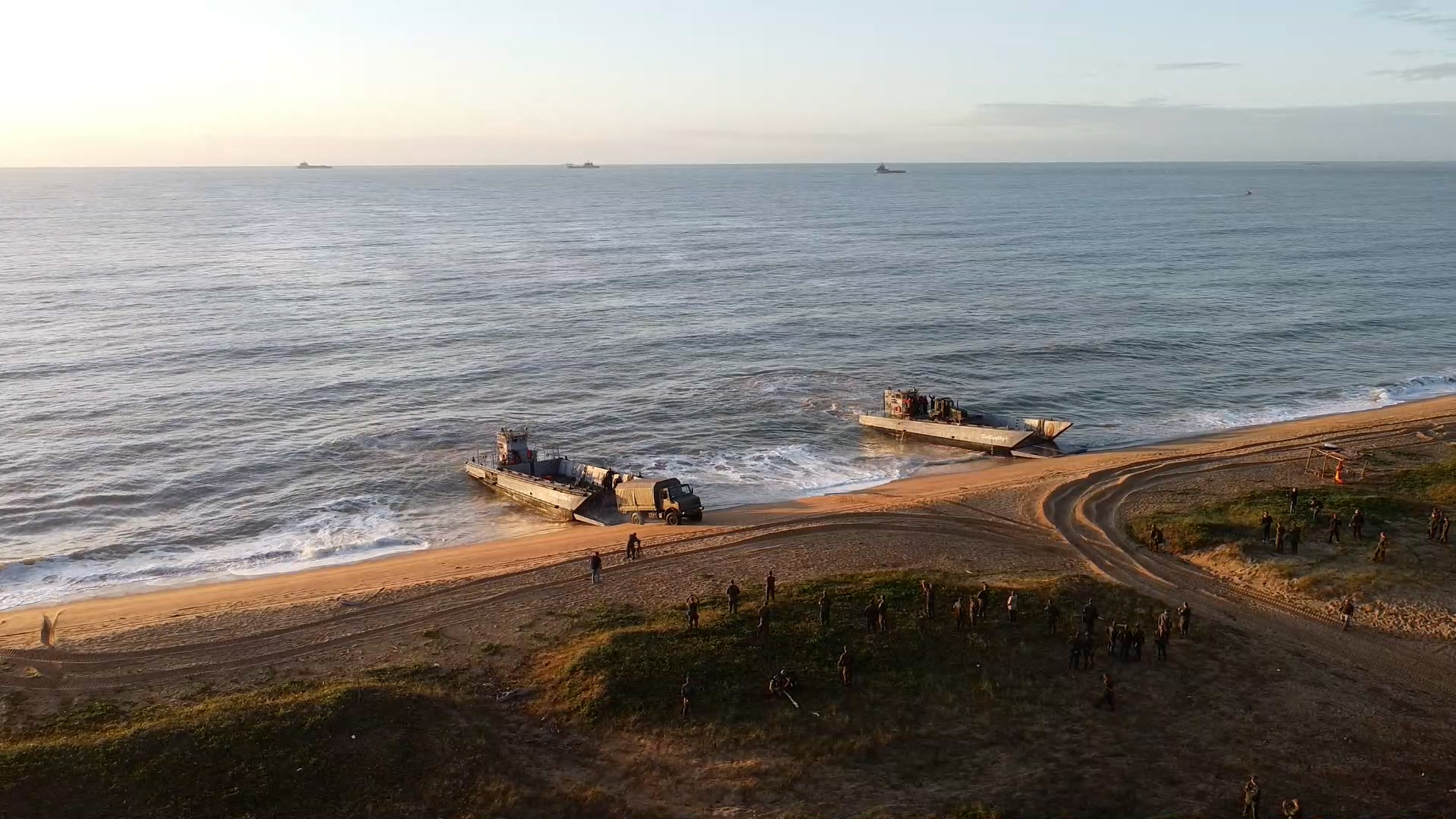
Amphibious operation exercise (2022)

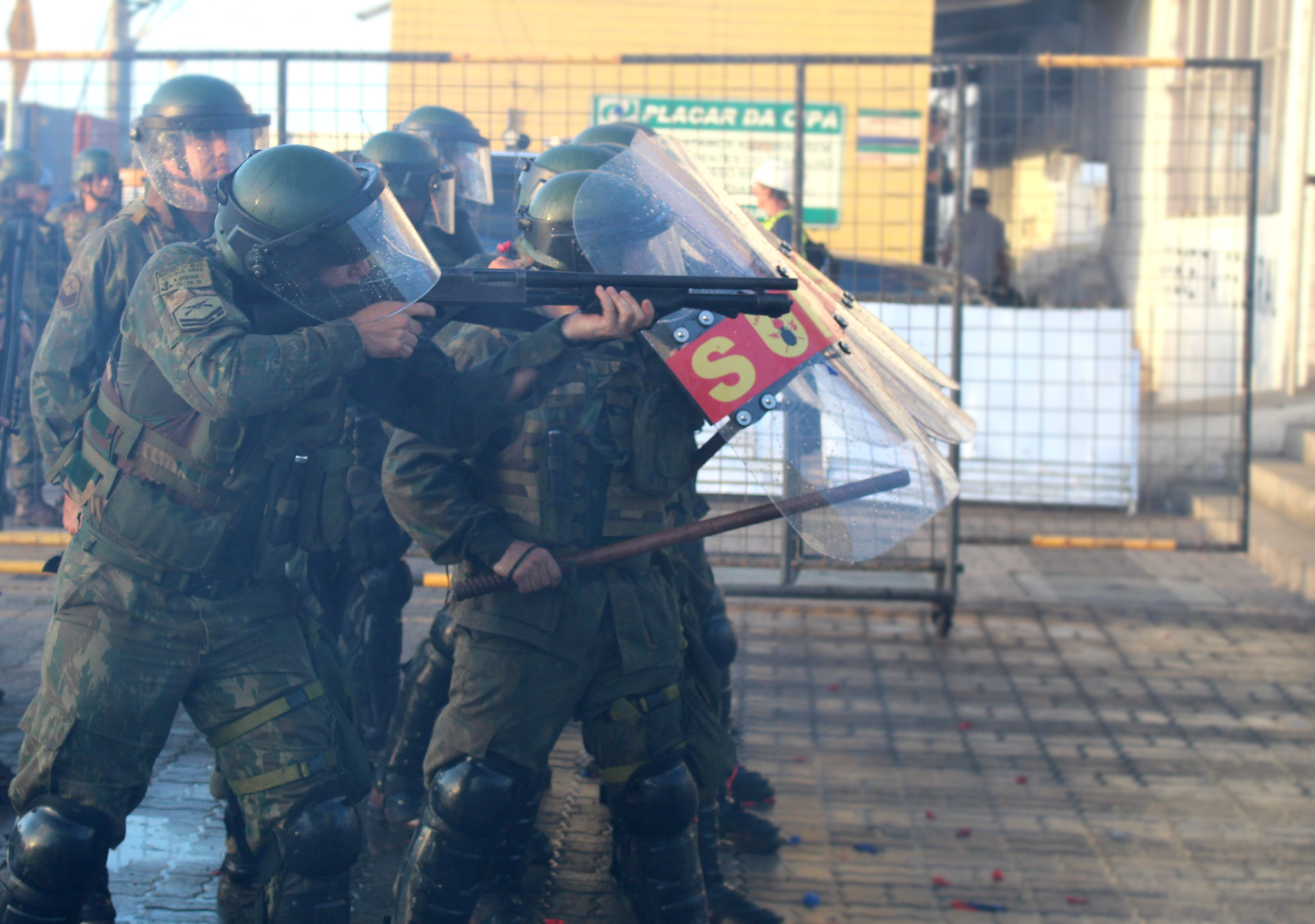
Riot control exercise in the Port of Fortaleza (2023)

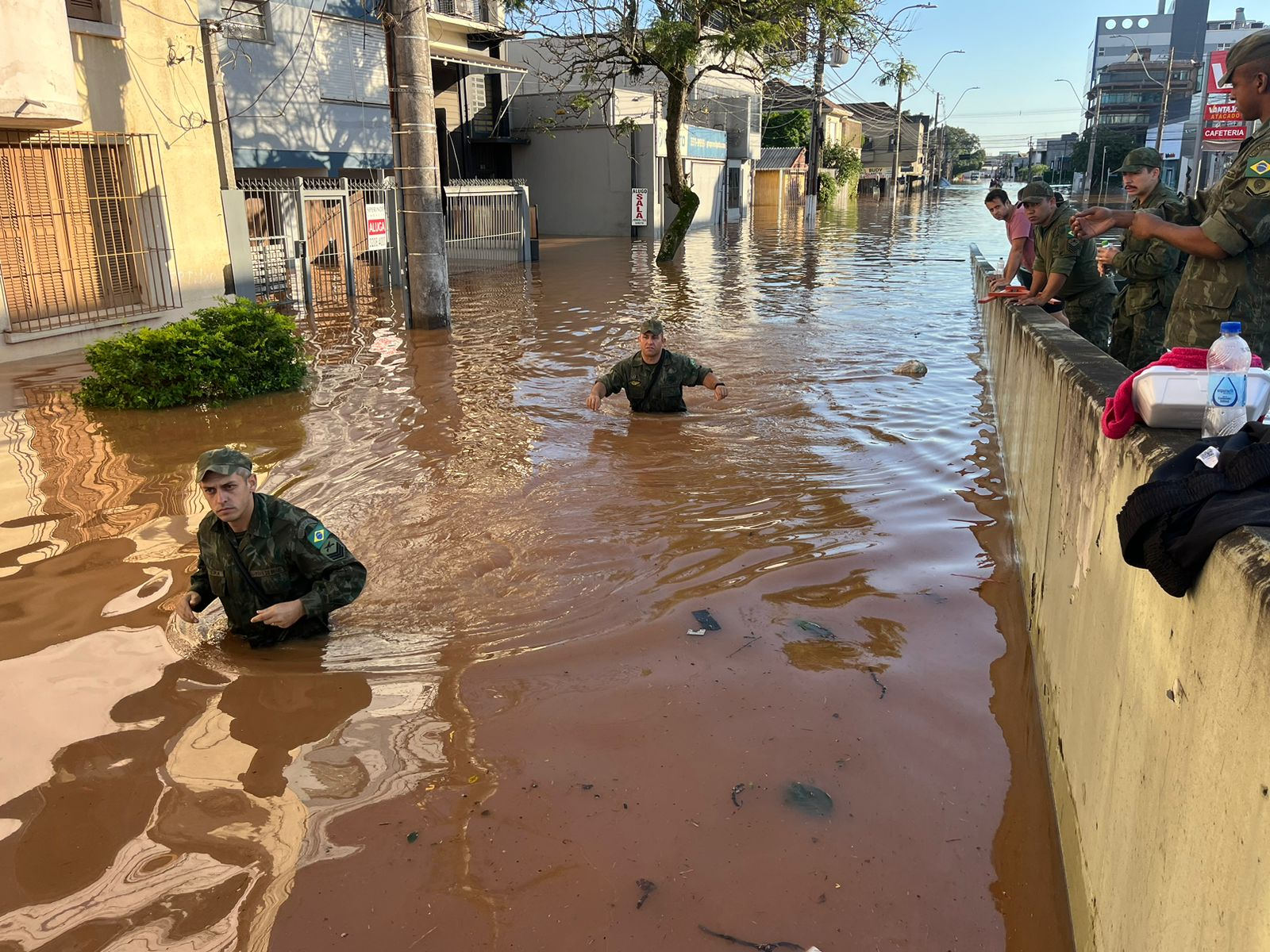
Humanitarian operation during the 2024 Rio Grande do Sul floods

The Marine Corps exists so that the Navy can project power over land, if needed by the conquest of a hostile shore, the most complex, intense and high-risk operation it may attempt. Territories held by marines may deny use of the sea to the enemy and/or ease naval and air operations for sea control. Through pre-positioning and maneuvers during crises, marines can be an instrument of deterrence.

Power projection over land, sea control, sea denial and deterrence are the four basic tasks of naval power within Brazilian Navy doctrine. The National Defense Strategy prioritizes sea denial over power projection. Brazil is not a great power, does not need to be able to intervene anywhere on the world nor maintains permanent overseas garrisons, unlike France and the United States. This leaves the CFN with the defense of archipelagos, oceanic islands and port and naval installations, peacekeeping, humanitarian aid, operations in support of foreign policy and the control of river margins during riverine operations.

Naval power has three components, naval, aeronaval and amphibious, and can be used in three forms, naval warfare, limited use of force and benign activities. Marines are the core of the amphibious component. A naval force carrying marines and aircraft is termed an "amphibious combination" (conjugado anfíbio), a similar concept to a US Amphibious Ready Group. This force may receive a variety of missions in all three usages of naval power.

When the government decrees a law and order operation, marines may be employed in public security, taking advantage of their training in policing and capture of enemies. These interventions historically expose the Navy to criticism from intellectuals and civil society, although the Marine Corps does have a degree of sympathy among the population. Law and order and naval patrol operations may include marines boarding civilian ships. When aboard, they may interact with other navies in exercises and advisory missions, evacuate non-combatants from conflict zones and provide security to diplomatic missions. As of 2008, Brazilian embassies in Bolivia, Paraguay and Haiti were guarded by marines.

An amphibious operation proper has four classic types, all of which presume a hostile or potentially hostile shore and are thus naval warfare operations. An amphibious assault is the conquest of a beachhead in a stretch of coastal land. An amphibious raid (incursão anfíbia, lit. 'amphibious incursion') is a short-term insertion and retrieval of ground forces. An amphibious demonstration is a feint by an amphibious combination, which approaches shore without landing. An amphibious withdrawal is the extraction of a ground force to the sea. A fifth type, included in the 2014 doctrine, is amphibious projection (projeção anfíbia), which admits the possibility of a friendly shore and the usage of limited force or benign operations. In this new concept, an amphibious operation is defined by the projection of military power over land, regardless of its purpose or the shore's hostility.

== Capabilities ==
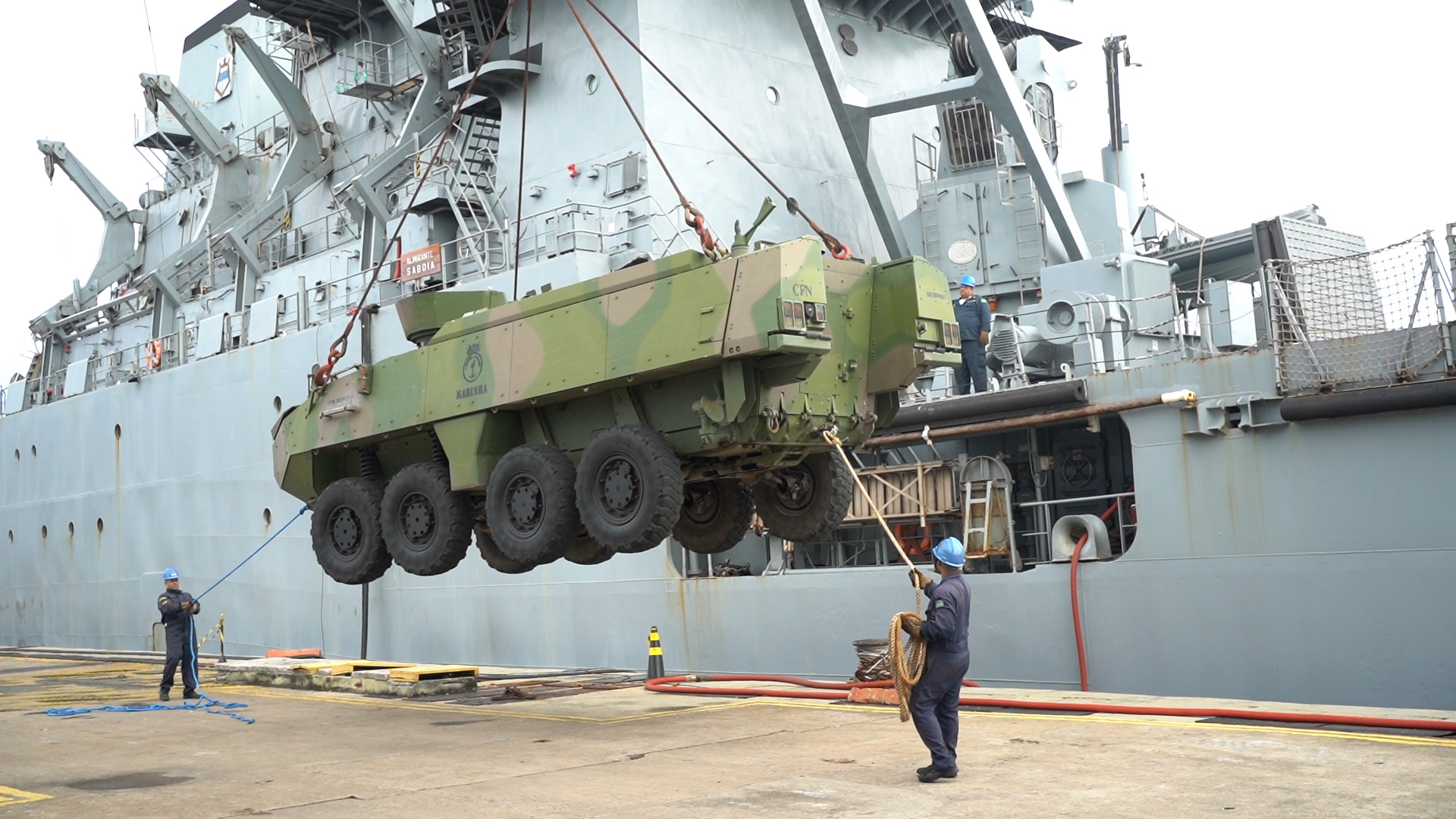
Mowag Piranha APC towed aboard the LST Almirante Saboia (2022)

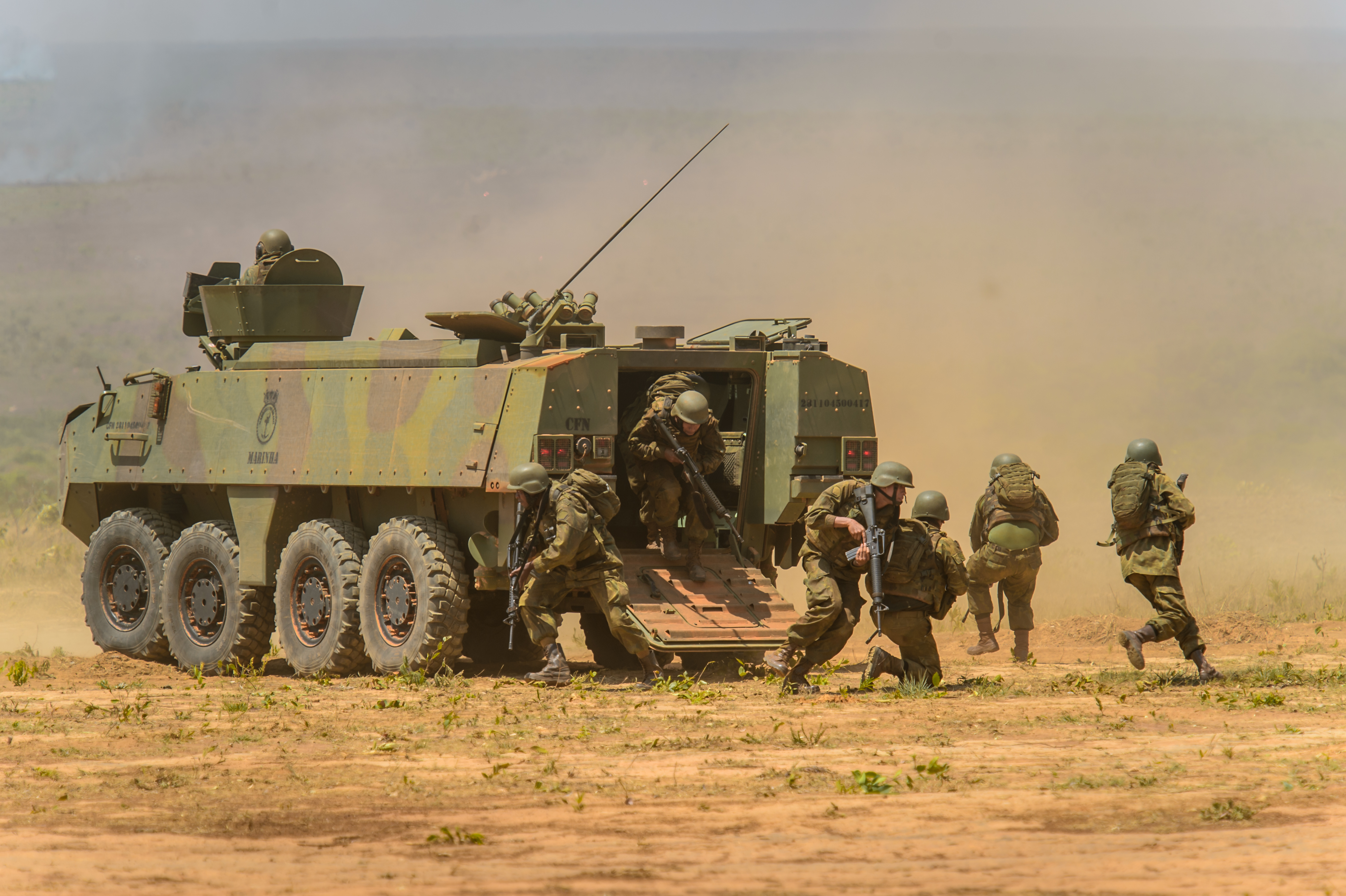
Infantry disembarking from a Piranha APC

The intervention force the CFN could be expected to organize would be light brigade-sized. Its personnel strength and availability of armor, artillery, landing ships and helicopters make Brazil "one of the very few countries in Latin American that may project an integral maritime war action", according to a 2024 report by the Spanish Edefa group. Equipment and combat organization are largely American-sourced, although the CFN's size and investment capacity cannot be compared to the USMC's. Notable differences include the limited shock capacity of Brazilian armor and the absence of an organic marine aviation, which must rely on the Aeronaval Force (Naval Aviation)'s helicopters.

Officially, the Marine Corps is distinguished from other regular troops by its "readiness, expeditionary capacity and amphibious character". A part of the Fleet Marine Force and ships, selected in rotation, is kept as a Rapid Employment Force (Força de Emprego Rápido, FER). Within 72 hours of activation, the FER must be embarked in the Fleet or Air Force. As of 2017, the FER was Amphibious Unit-sized (800 to 2,200 marines). As a professional, high-readiness and strategically mobile force, the Fleet Marine Force is comparable to the Brazilian Army's strategic reaction brigades and commands, such as the Parachute Infantry Brigade, and distinct from the Army as a whole, with its "heavier", slower to mobilize organization.

Inherent characteristics of naval power — mobility, wide cargo capacity and the possibility of direct logistical support from ships (seabasing) — are the source of expeditionary capacity. As defined in doctrine, expeditionary operations happen far from bases, in another country, with a self-sustaining force and limited objectives and timetables. In theory an overseas Brazilian operation could begin with the Navy's immediate reaction, followed by the Army with its larger strength, supply chain and timetables. Any such intervention must be versatile: a humanitarian operation may turn to limited use of force or even naval warfare as security conditions degrade.

For wartime, the CFN's doctrine favors maneuver over attrition warfare, avoiding head-on clashes with enemy units. Maneuver warfare is translated to amphibious settings by two USMC concepts, Operational Maneuver From the Sea (OMFTS) and its tactical application, the Ship-to-Objective Maneuver (STOM). OMFTS means the sea is used to reach a position of advantage on land, and STOM excludes the operational pause after the conquest of a beach. Maneuver warfare doctrine entered manuals in 2003. Ten years later, an analyst at Âncoras e Fuzis, a CFN Doctrinary Development Command periodical, noted that the principles of maneuver warfare were still routinely ignored in exercises and operations. This philosophy of combat has no fixed formula and would take time to be internalized.

=== Amphibious ships ===
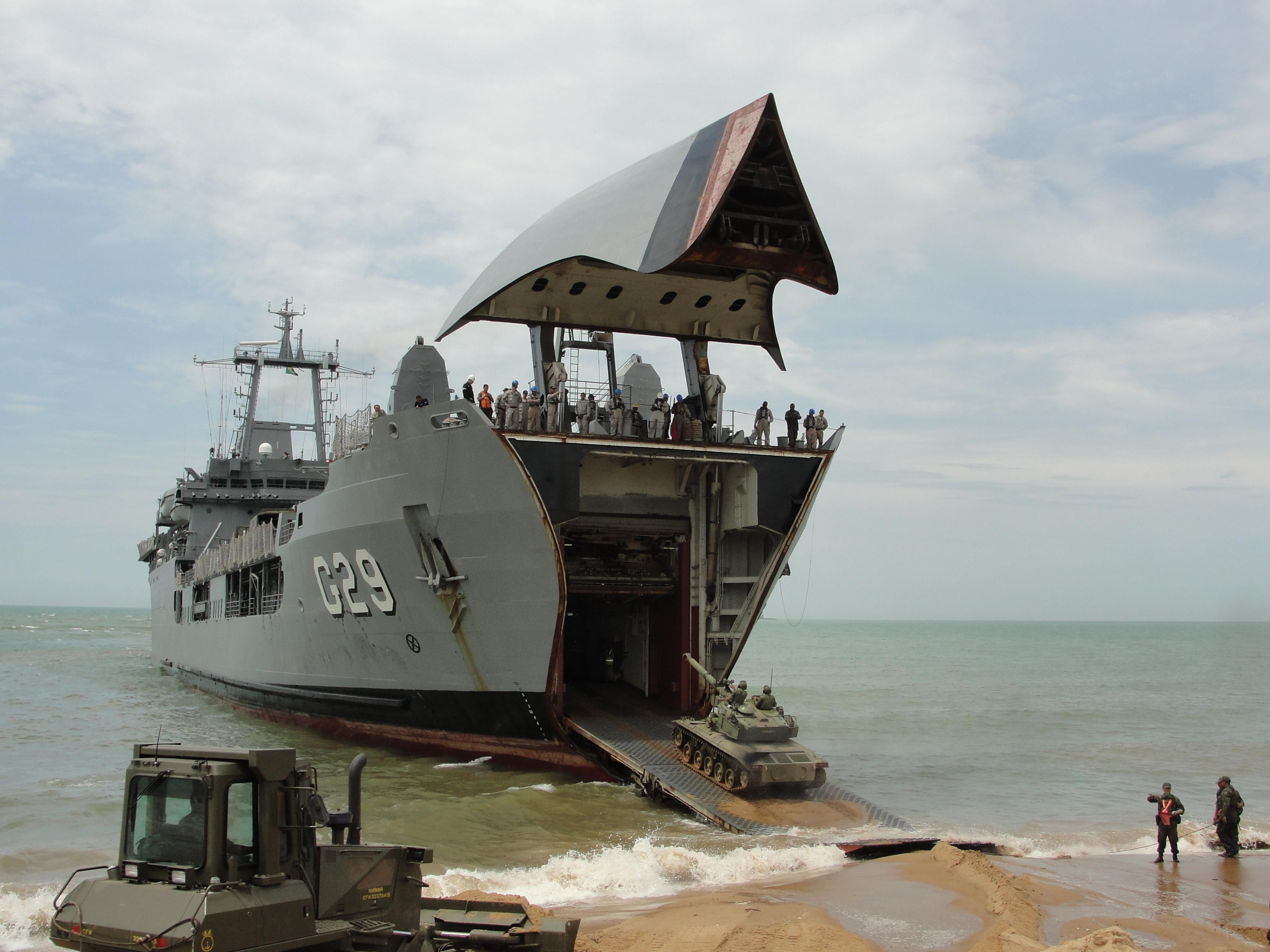
SK-105 light tank boarding LST Garcia D'Ávila

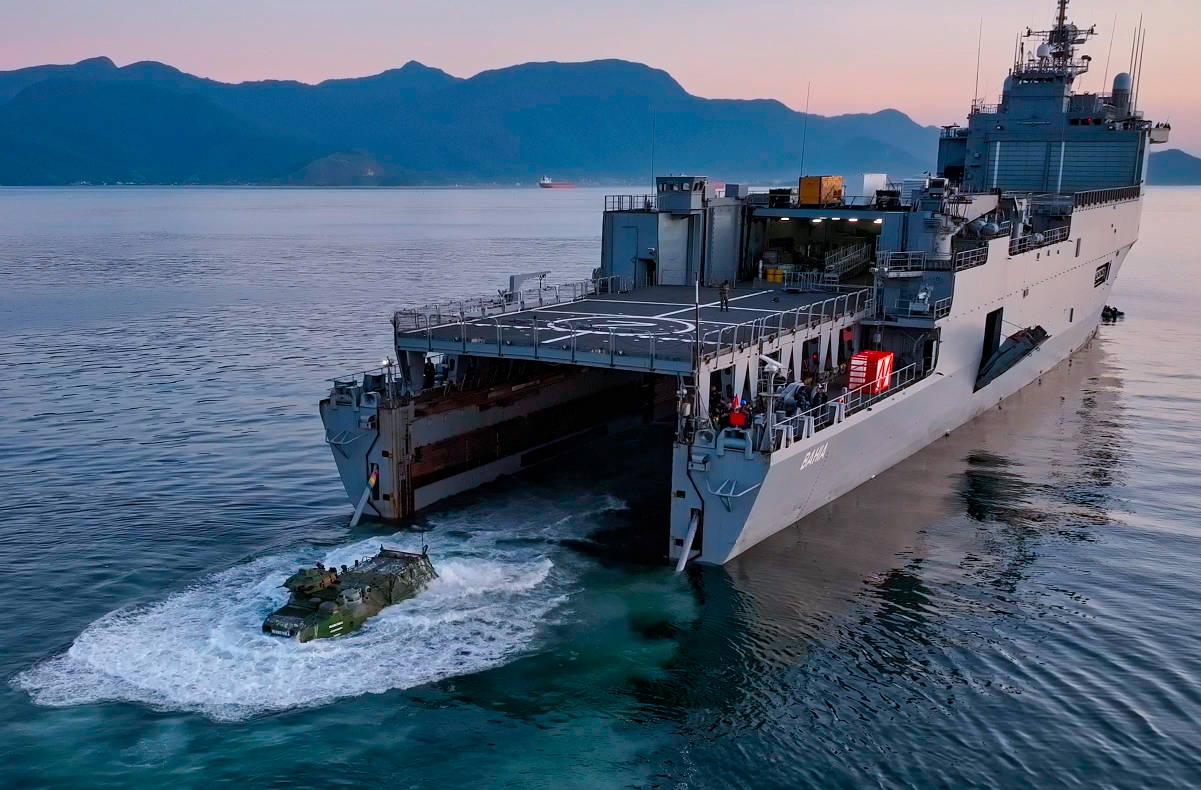
Assault Amphibious Vehicle launched from the well deck of LPD Bahia

The transport of troops and material ashore and command and control over actions on land rely on amphibious ships. The Fleet historically fields several categories of amphibious warfare ships (see table at the end of the section), beginning with the Custódio de Mello-class troopships (NTrT, Navio de Transporte de Tropas), first commissioned in 1955. They were comparable to cargo ships, with an average capacity for 500 marines. Transshipment was difficult, as it could only happen through nets or cranes. By the early 1960s, merchant ships were also used as troop transports.

The next category was that of the LST or Tank Landing Ship (Navio de Desembarque de Carros de Combate, NDCC), which can beach and project a ramp from its bow for direct landing. This is a practical model, but exposes a large ship to a potentially hostile shore. A safe distance from the shore may instead be achieved with a LSD or Dock Landing Ship (Navio de Desembarque de Doca, NDD). This ship can flood its lower deck, or well deck, and open a door at its stern for landing craft and amphibious vehicles. A LPD, Landing Platform Dock or Multipurpose Dock Ship (Navio Doca Multipropósito, NDM) in Brazilian terminology, combines a well deck with room for helicopters and more advanced command and control instruments. From the 1960s to the 1990s, the light aircraft carrier Minas Gerais routinely landed marines with its helicopters, even though this was not its primary role.

The Multipurpose Helicopter Carrier (PHM)/Multipurpose Aircraft Carrier (NAM) Atlântico, commissioned in 2018, lacks a well deck but can lower landing craft from the sides of its hull and offers wide aviation and command and control capacities. Upon its commissioning in 2018, Military Watch magazine concluded "Brazil is not set to become a major naval power capable of projecting force or conducting effective amphibious landings - and the acquisition of a single light amphibious assault ship will do little to change that". It argued the Brazilian Navy's frigates would be an insufficient escort for a task force led by the Atlântico, leaving it unprotected. The War Zone, on the other hand, centered Atlântico within Brazil's "small but significant amphibious assault flotilla, which is made of a hodgepodge of four second-hand vessels of French, UK and US origin". The decommissioning of LST Mattoso Maia in 2023 reduced this flotilla to three ships, the Atlântico, Bahia and Almirante Saboia.

Historical and present major amphibious vessels of the Brazilian Navy
Class	Origin	Name	In service	Troops
Custódio de Mello	Japan	NTrT Custódio de Mello (G-20)	1954 – 2002	500
Custódio de Mello	Japan	NTrT Barroso Pereira (G-16)	1955 – 1995	500
Custódio de Mello	Japan	NTrT Ary Parreiras (G-21)	1957 – 2009	500
Custódio de Mello	Japan	NTrT Soares Dutra (G-22)	1957 – 2001	500
LST 511 - 1152	United States	NDCC Garcia D'Ávila (G-28)	1971 – 1989	147
De Soto County	United States	NDCC Duque de Caxias (G-26)	1973 – 2000	634
Thomaston	United States	NDD Ceará (G-30)	1989 – 2016	341
Thomaston	United States	NDD Rio de Janeiro (G-31)	1990 – 2012	341
Newport	United States	NDCC Mattoso Maia (G-28)	1994 – 2023	351
Sir Galahad	United Kingdom	NDCC Garcia D'Ávila (G-29)	2007 – 2019	340
Sir Bedivere	United Kingdom	NDCC Almirante Saboia (G-25)	2009 – present	440
Foudre	France	NDM Bahia (G-40)	2016 – present	450
Ocean	United Kingdom	NAM Atlântico (A-140)	2018 – present	800

=== Landing craft ===
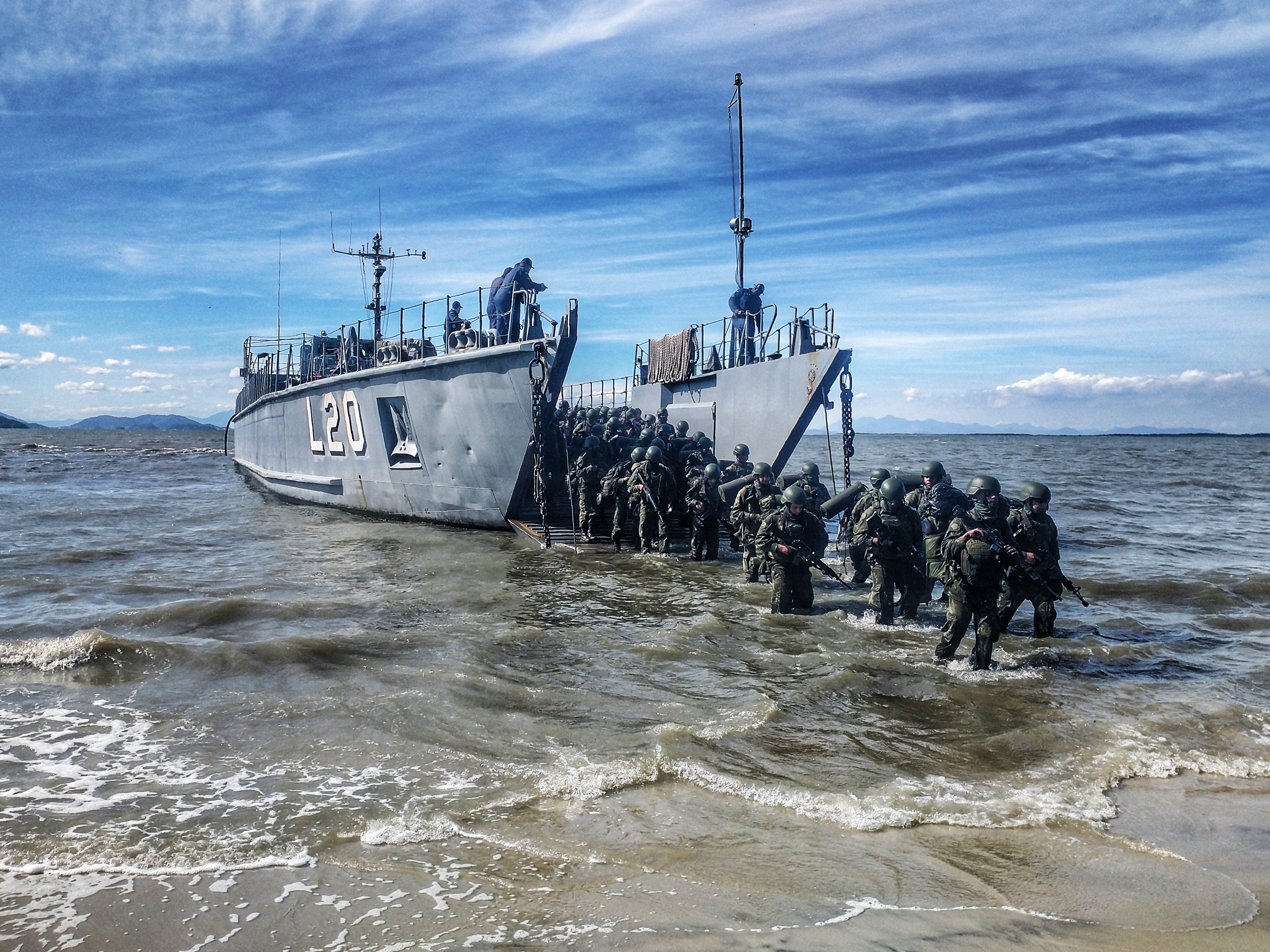
Infantry landing from the LCU Marambaia

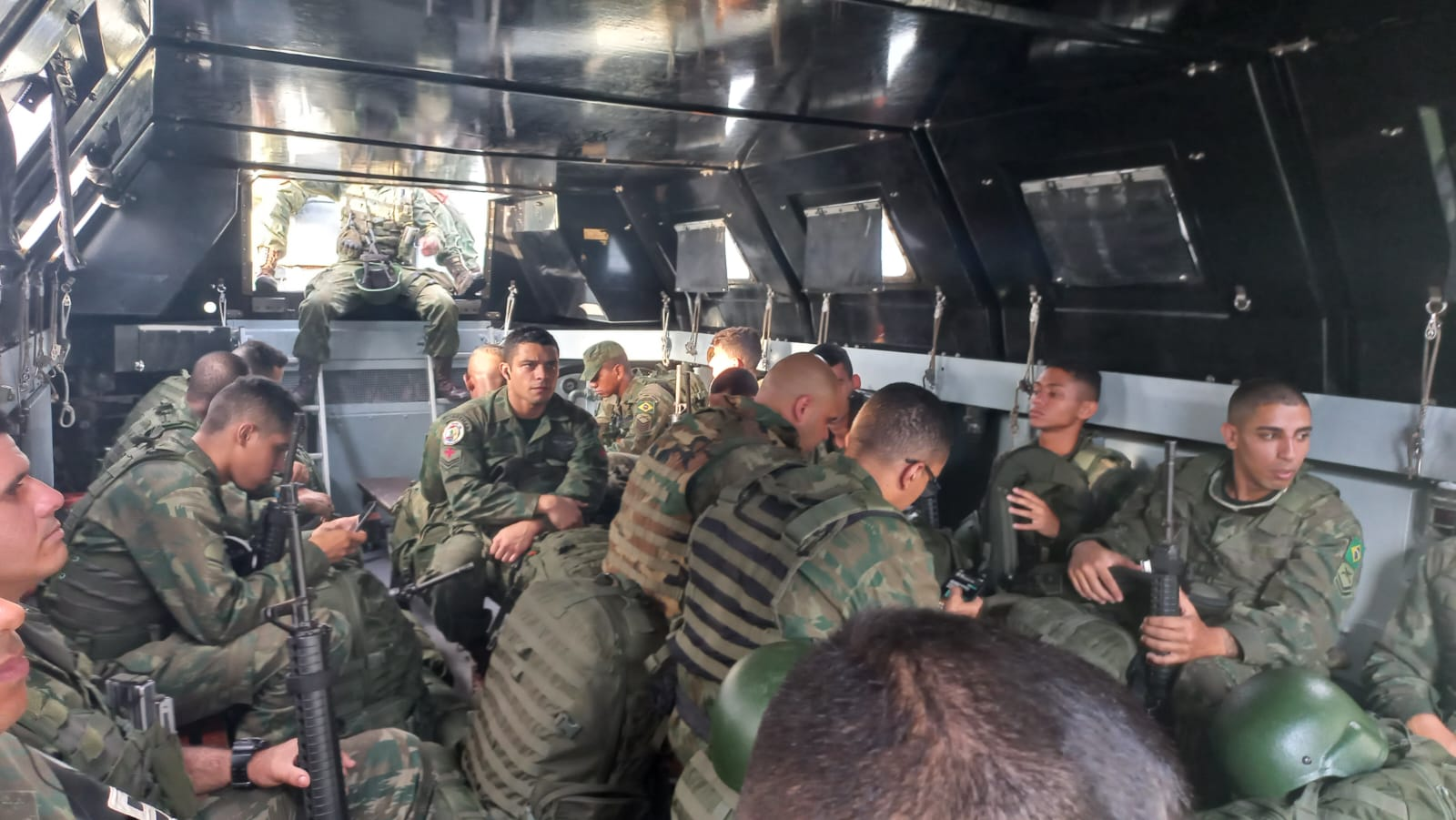
LCM interior

For transport from larger ships to the beach, in 2014 the Brazilian Navy possessed 3 Landing Craft Utility or LCUs (Embarcação de Desembarque de Carga Geral, EDCG), 8 LCVPs or Landing Craft Vehicle Personnel (Embarcação de Desembarque de Viaturas e Pessoal, EDVP) and 16 LCMs or Landing Craft Mechanized (Embarcação de Desembarque de Viaturas Militares, EDVM). The LCUs and LCMs belong to the 1st Support Squadron (1.° Esquadrão de Apoio), whereas LCVPs are spread out between several units, some of them in riverine bases.

LCUs and LCMs available in 2018 dated to the 1970s to 1990s, with some younger units, such as the Caieiras-class LCMs, delivered in 2012–2013, and the LCU Marambaia, acquired with the LPD Bahia. Caieiras-class LCMs carry up to 80 troops or 72 tons of cargo, Guarapari-class LCUs (Guarapari, Tambaú and Camboriú), up to 80 troops or 172 tons, and Marambaia, up to 380 tons or six Amphibious Assault Vehicles. The Bahia LPD's well deck can take them in several arrangements, such as the Marambaia and an additional Guarapari-class or a Guarapari-class and four LCMs.

Until the commissioning of the Atlântico and its complement of five British LCVP Mk 5 craft in 2015, around 60 LCUs served in the Brazilian Navy though the years, sourced from the United States, Japan and Brazil. Original models were little better than the transports used in the 1944 Normandy landings. The LCVP Mk 5 is similar to its predecessors in size, with enough room for 35 passengers, but it is faster and allows landings at greater distances from the shore.

The 2009 PAEMB planned for the procurement of 16 LCUs, 32 LCMs and eight units of a new category, the air-cushioned landing craft (LCAC), designated VDCA (eículo de Desembarque de Colchão de Ar) in Brazilian terminology.

=== Air support ===
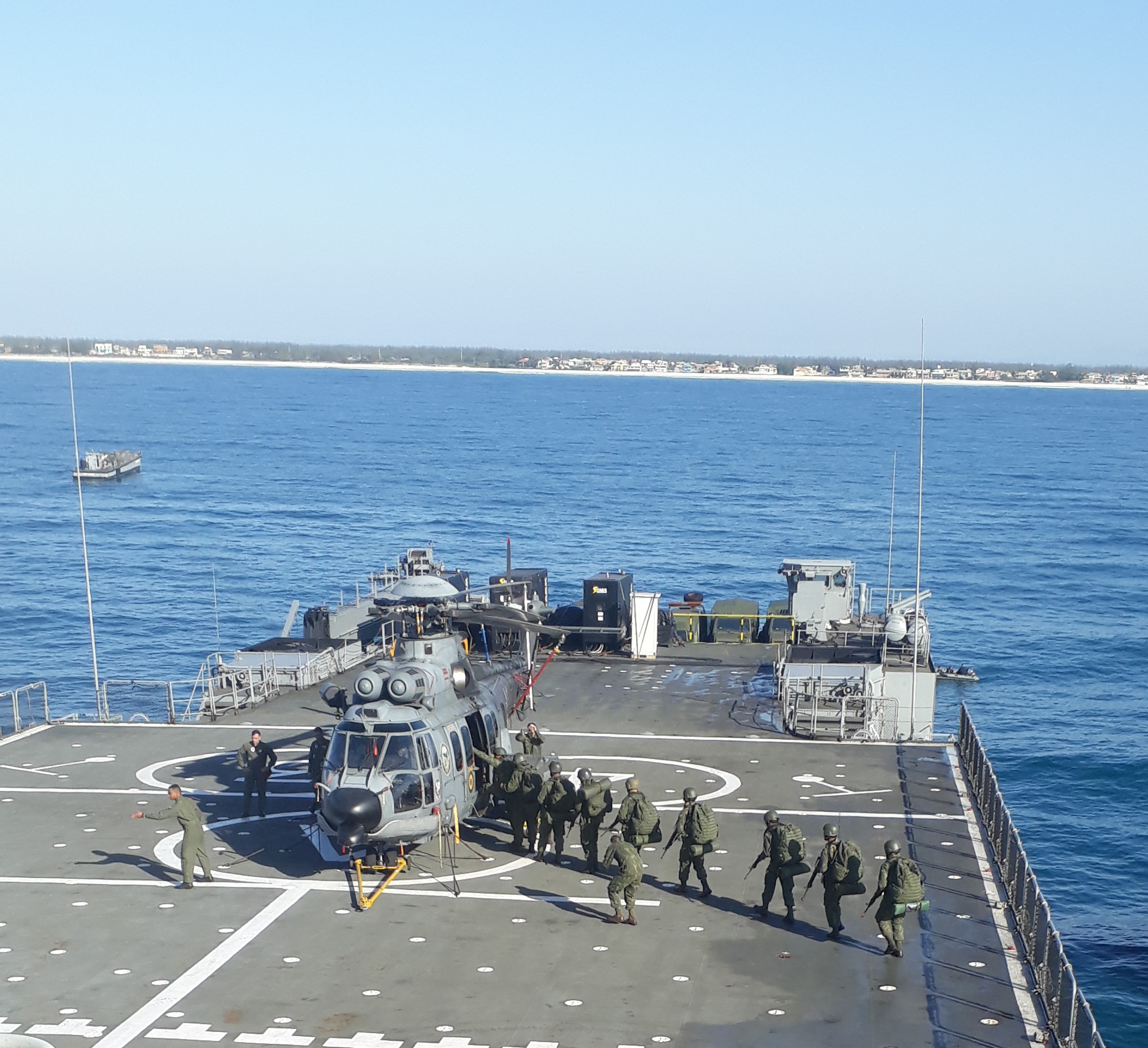
Infantry boarding an UH-15 helicopter

The Aeronaval Force's helicopters operate with the Marine Corps, but have to divide their attention with their other roles. The idea of an organic marine aviation has never received the blessing of naval authorities. Naval Aviation helicopters provide marines with fire support from their missiles and machine guns, personnel and cargo transport, visual reconnaissance, personnel evacuation and search and rescue missions. Transport missions are usually given to the 2nd Utility Helicopter Squadron (HU-2)'s UH-15 Super Cougar aircraft. This model can haul up to 29 personnel and is one the Navy's largest and heaviest, and therefore, can only board a helicopter carrier, LPD or LSD. Nine were in service with the HU-2 in 2023. Other missions are handled by the 1st Utility Helicopter Squadron's UH-12 and UH-13 Esquilo and UH-17 aircraft. A dedicated attack helicopter for close air support to the CFN is in demand, but a model has yet to be chosen.

== Personnel ==
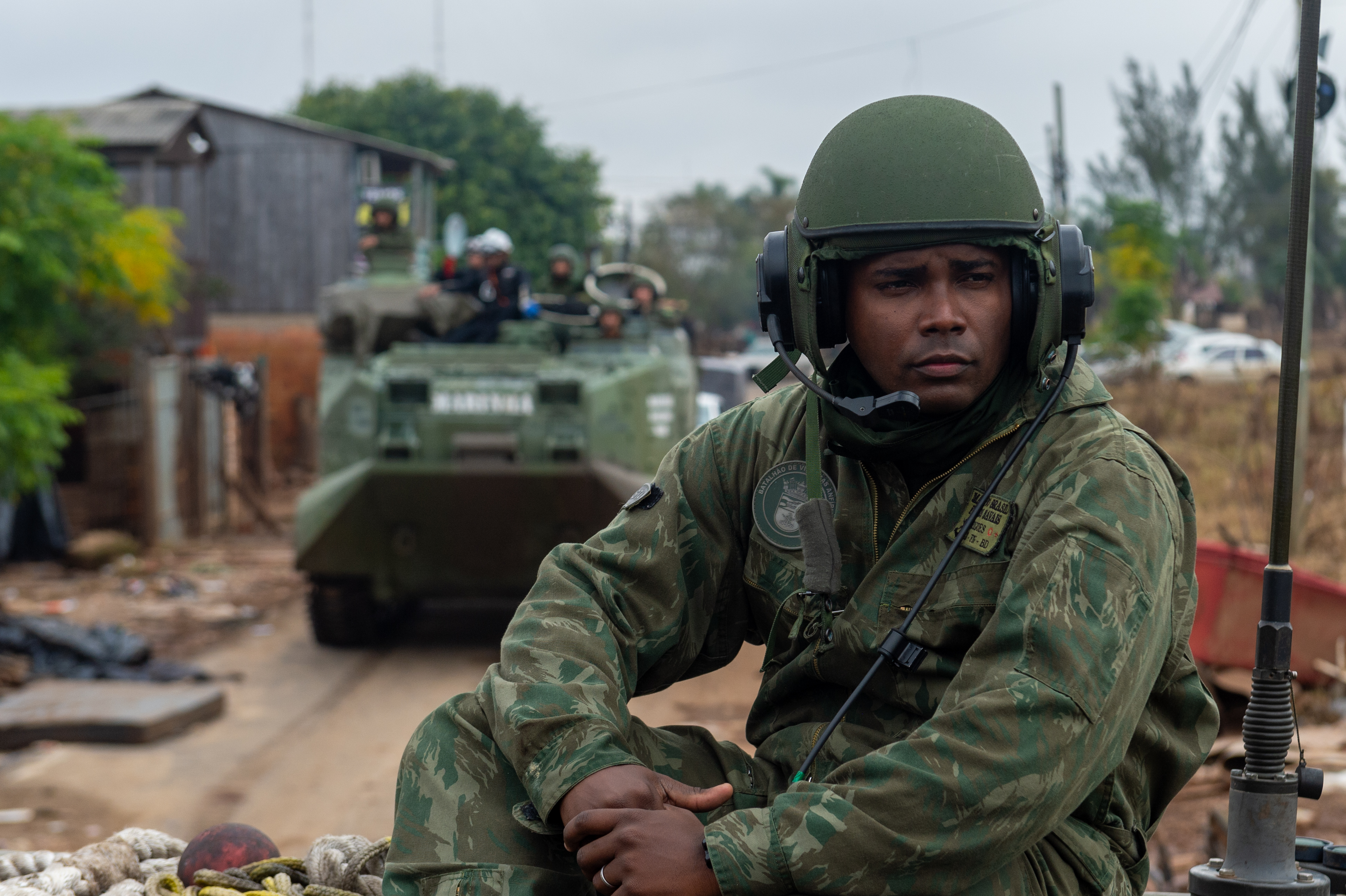
Amphibious Assault Vehicle crewman

The International Institute for Strategic Studies (IISS) specifies a total strength of 16 thousand marines in 2024. Brazilian legislation provided for 11 admirals and 797 other officers in service in 2024. Enlisted personnel were at a total of 15,988 in 2023. 14,926 were in the Marine Enlisted Cadre (Quadro de Praças de Fuzileiros Navais, QPFN) and the remainder in the Musicians' Cadre, Special Cadre and Complementary Cadre. Out of this total, 1,183 were suboficiais (chief petty officers), 6,628 sergeants, 3,343 corporals and 4,834 soldiers (privates). (Note: Portaria Nº 124/MB/MD, June 6th, 2023. See nomenclature at Portaria Nº 41 MB/MD, July 21st, 2022.) Rank terminology is the same as in the Navy as a whole, with the exception of the lowest rank, that of seaman/sailor (marinheiro) in the Fleet.

Marines are a professional and volunteer cadre, selected in entrance examinations and inducted with a career plan. The Corps has no "recruits" in the sense of the Army's yearly levies of conscripts. Unlike the Army, the Navy does not assume for itself the missions of nationwide presence and civic education through conscription, focusing on national defense proper. An individual inducted into the Army is trained at combat units, while his counterpart in the Marine Corps must first pass through a dedicated training center.

The media sometimes names marines as the Navy's "elite force". In academia, a qualitative distinction between the Army and Marine Corps is sometimes made by comparing conscripts with professional soldiers. In the professional model, combat units are relieved of the burdens of early training, which absorbs all of the Army's structure. Soldiers spend longer in service and are trained in more complex subjects. Defenders of training in combat units argue that it fosters closer connections between commanders and inferiors. The choice is between more specific training or tighter unity of command. In addition, the professional model is more expensive: more senior soldiers burden the payroll heavier than recruits.

=== Recruitment ===
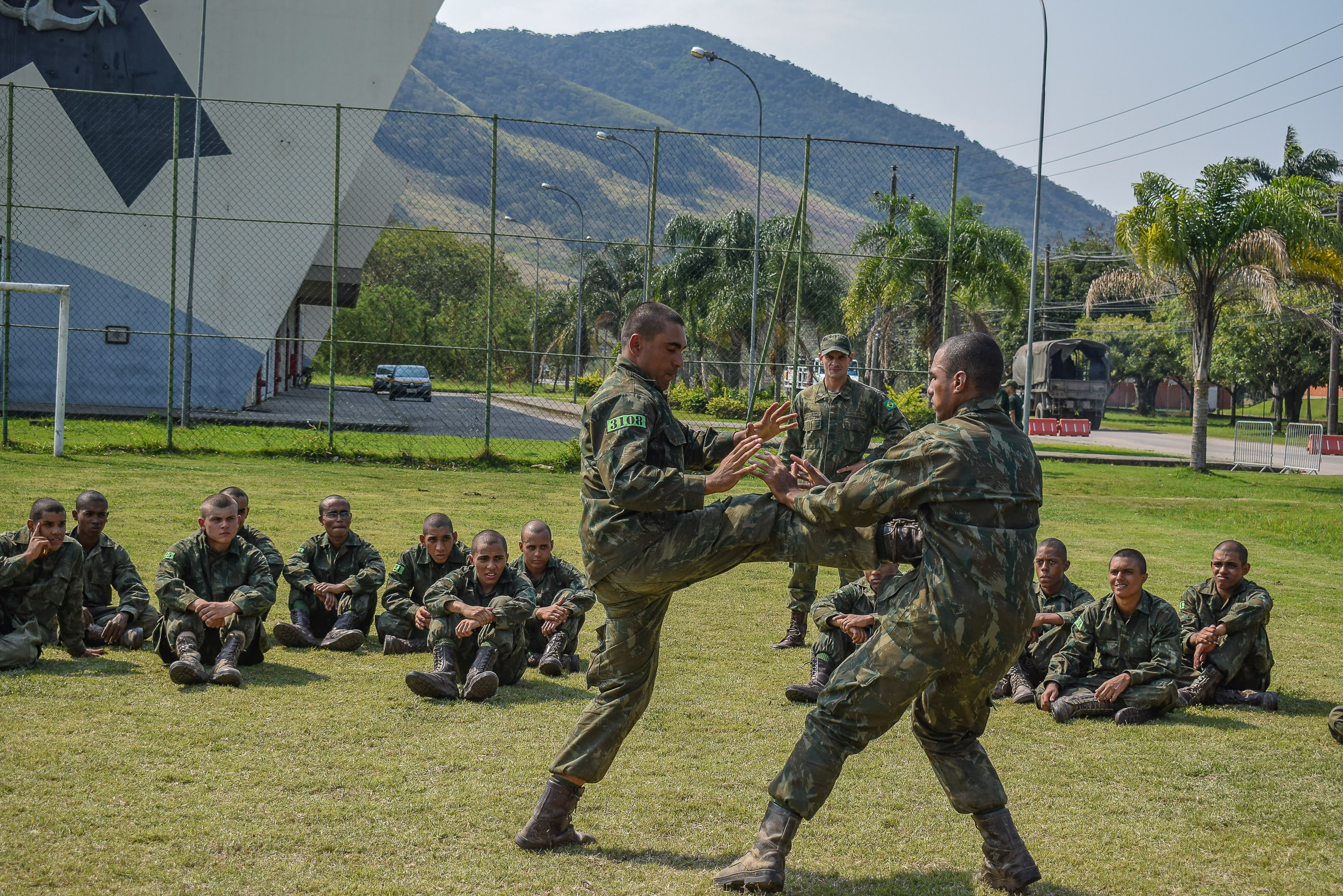

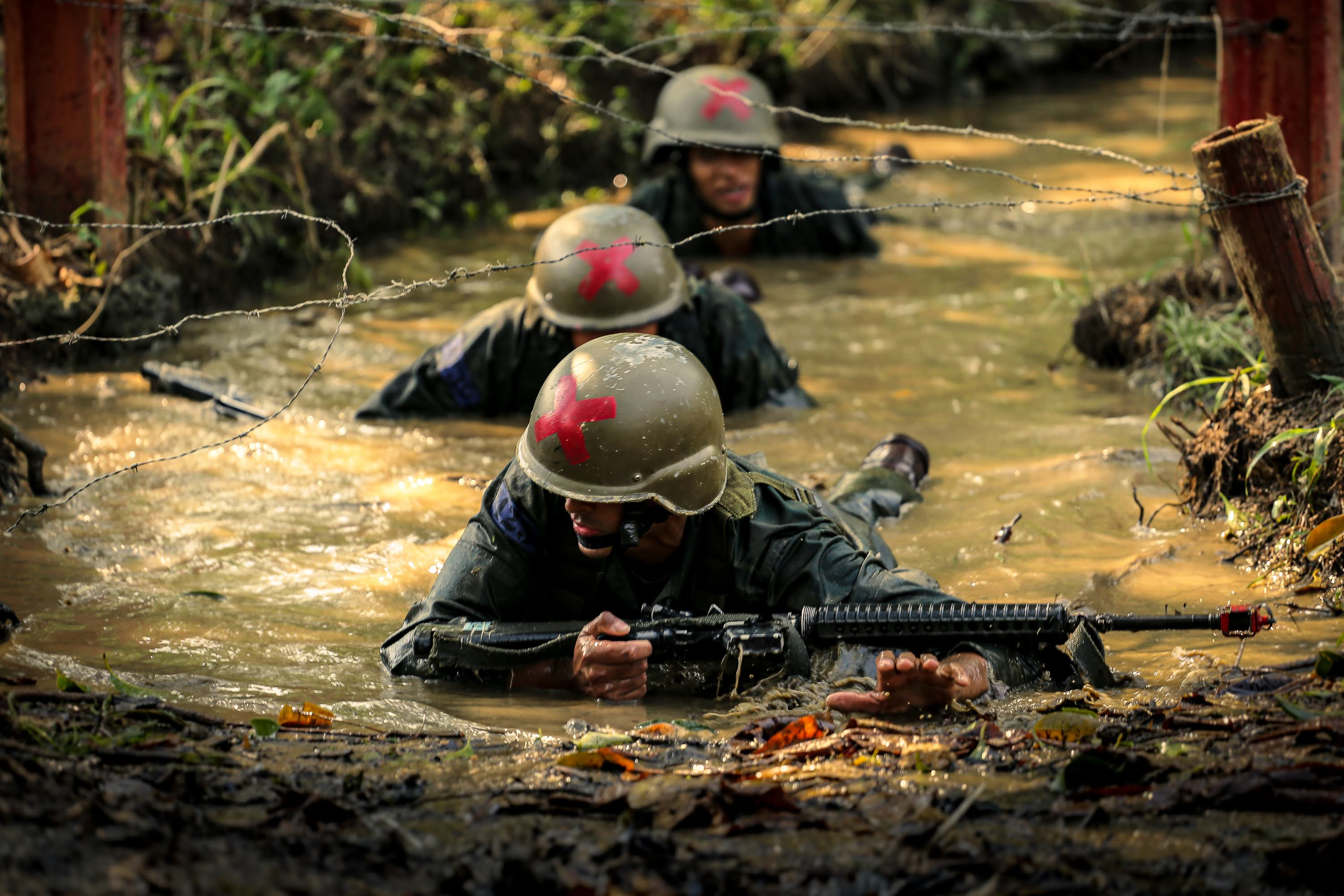
Apprentice marines at CIAMPA

The main entrance route for enlisted ranks is the Marine Soldier Training Course (Curso de Formação de Soldados Fuzileiros Navais, C-FSD-FN) held at the Admiral Milcíades P. Alves Instruction Center (CIAMPA), in Rio de Janeiro, and the Brasília Instruction and Training Center (CIAB). Entrants are titled "apprentices" and undergo 17 weeks of training. In 2024, 720 entrants reached the course's adaptation period, including the first 120 women admitted into the C-FSD-FN. Further courses are held at the Admiral Sylvio de Camargo Instruction Center (CIASC), in Rio, and training in a realistic waterborne operations environment uses the Restinga da Marambaia Training Center (CADIM). The Almirante Adalberto Nunes Physical Education Center (CEFAN) is used for physical preparation.

In examinations from 2018 to 2023, the number of vacancies ranged from 960 to 1.300, and the number of applicants, between 15.191 and 32.045, for a candidate/vacancy ratio of 15,82 to 30,35. In 2024, 720 candidates reached the course's adaptation period, including the first 120 women to enter the C-FSD-FN. In a socioeconomic profile of 176 apprentice marines from the 2023 course, 86,4% had a full secondary education and the remainder had an incomplete or full higher education. 84,1% hailed from southeastern Brazil. All were aged 18 to 22.

Officers enter the Corps through the Naval Academy, (Note: Except for the Complementary Cadre, drawn from candidates with prior degrees at civilian universities, and the Auxiliary Cadre, composed of promoted enlisted personnel.) where aspirantes (students) opt for one of three Corps to serve in the remainder of their careers: Armada (Fleet), Fuzileiros Navais (Marines) or Intendência (Logistics). Within the second option, they choose between specializations in Electronics, Weapons Systems or Machines. The choice of Corps and specialization happens at the end of the 2nd years when embarked in the "Aspirantex" exercise. The Marine and Logistics Corps have less vacancies (about 16% of the total each in 2014). By the end of the fourth year, aspirantes receive the rank of guarda-marinha, with which they remain for one year until their full acceptance into the officer corps.

=== Career ===
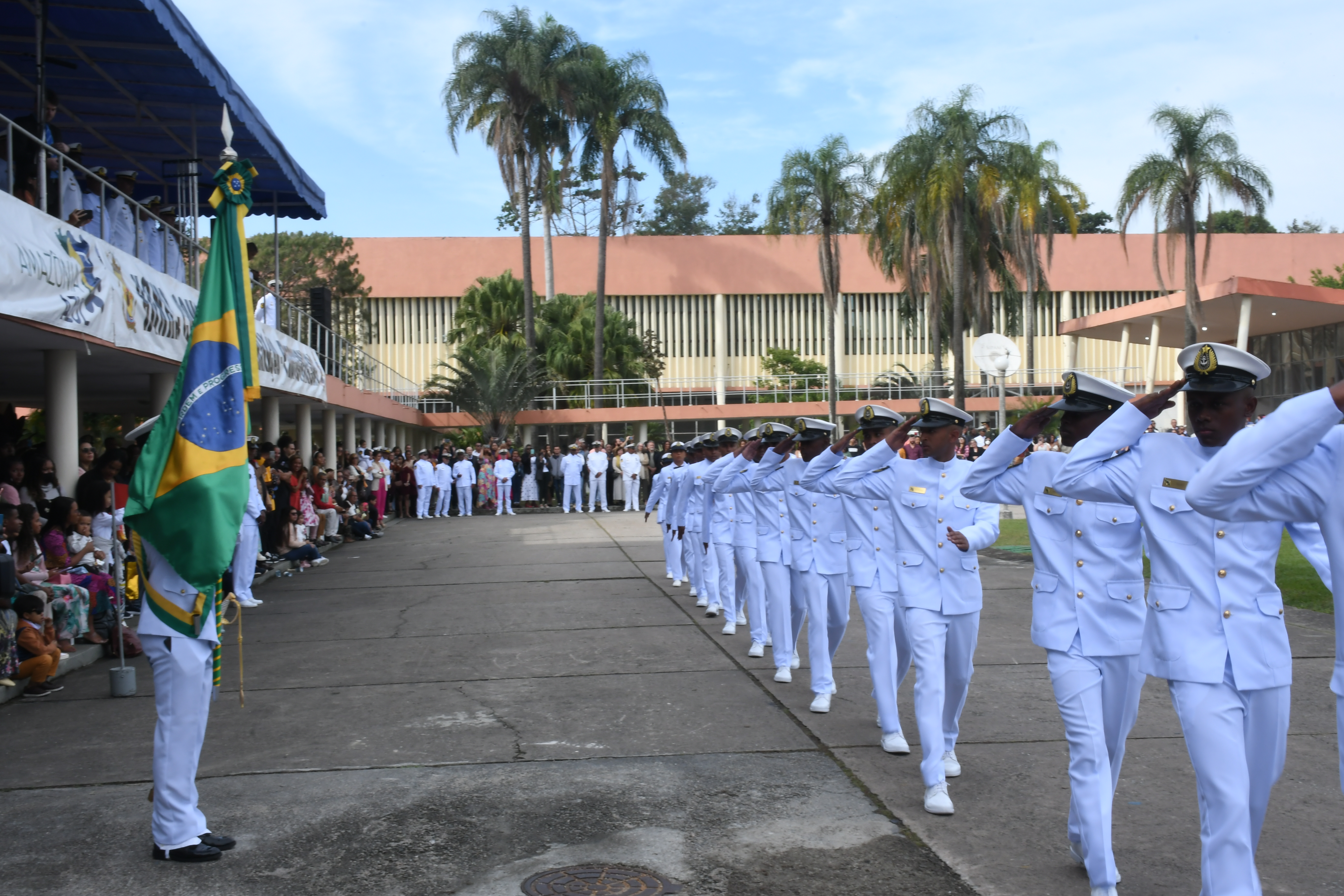
Ceremony at CIASC's sergeant promotion course

As of 2017, a marine soldier (private) begins his career in a military unit with a commitment to remain in the Corps for two years. If accepted on internal examinations, he may be promoted to corporal in his fourth to seventh year of service, specializing in Artillery, Infantry, Writing, Engines and Machines, Engineering, Naval Communications, Drum and Bugle, Aviation, Electronics, Combat Medicine or Armor. Internal examinations and courses continue, with a promotion to 3rd sergeant in the tenth to fourteenth career year. After six years in this rank, he may be promoted to 2nd sergeant and then five more years to 1st sergeant and another five to suboficial. In 2023 a sergeant driving an Assault Amphibious Vehicle, whose value may exceed 15 million reais, had a net income of about R$6,000.00, less than what a civilian truck driver working with hazardous cargo would receive.

For officers, career steps are the same in the Fleet and Marines. They'll spend about eleven years in the lower and middle ranks (1st and 2nd lieutenant and captain lieutenant), in which promotion is by seniority. Another eighteen years are spent as higher officers (capitão de corveta, capitão de fragata and capitão de mar e guerra), with promotions by seniority and merit. Improvement and specialization courses are taken across the career. For the few promoted to flag ranks (rear admiral, vice admiral and almirante de esquadra), selection is the additional criterion. The four-star position of almirante de esquadra, highest in the peacetime Navy, was opened to marines in 1980. Only a single active-duty marine may hold this rank. To increase their number of candidates, marine admirals spend more time in rear and vice-admiral ranks.

=== Traditions ===
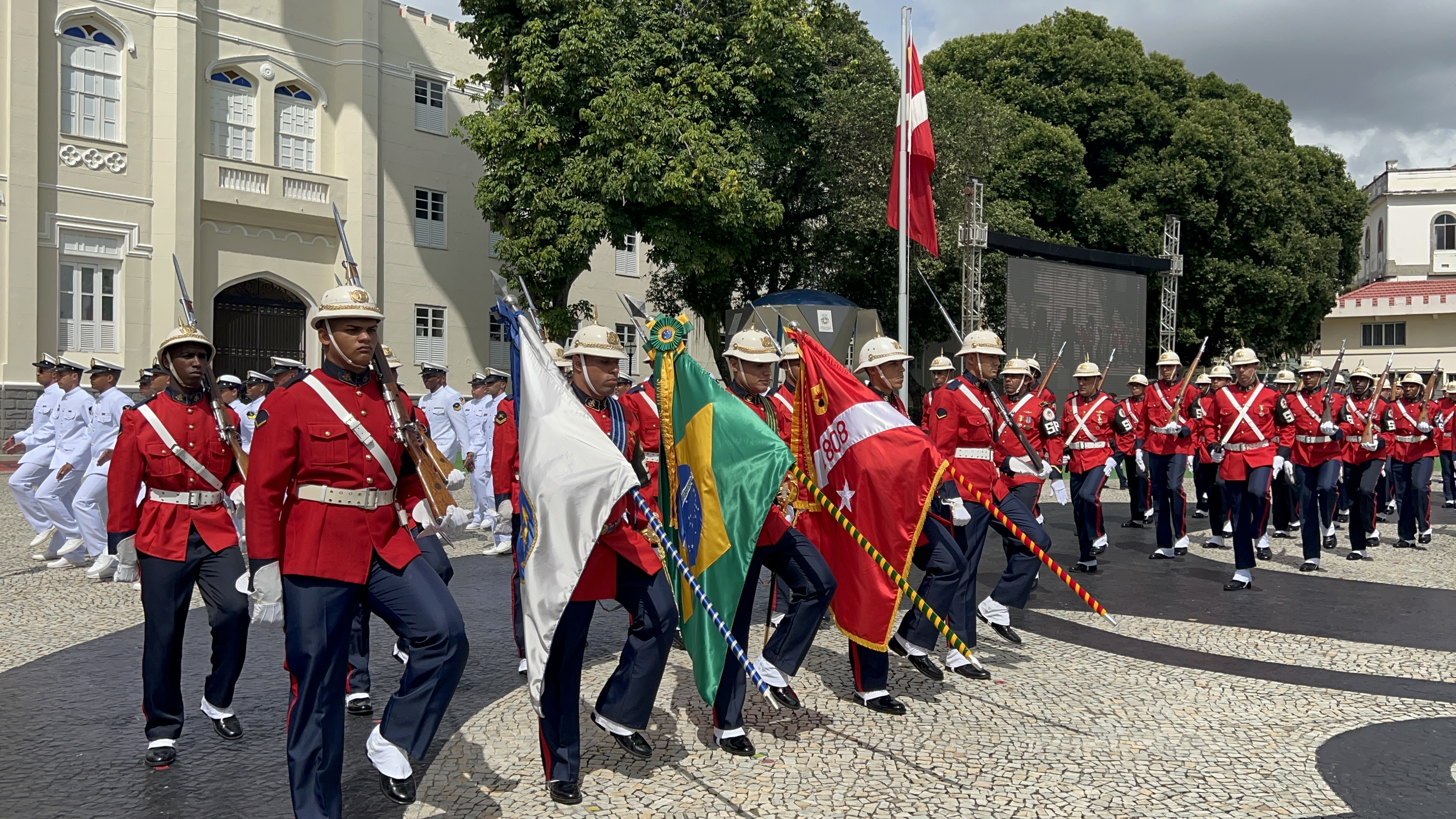
Marine military police in full ceremonial uniform bearing CFN and Navy standards and the national flag

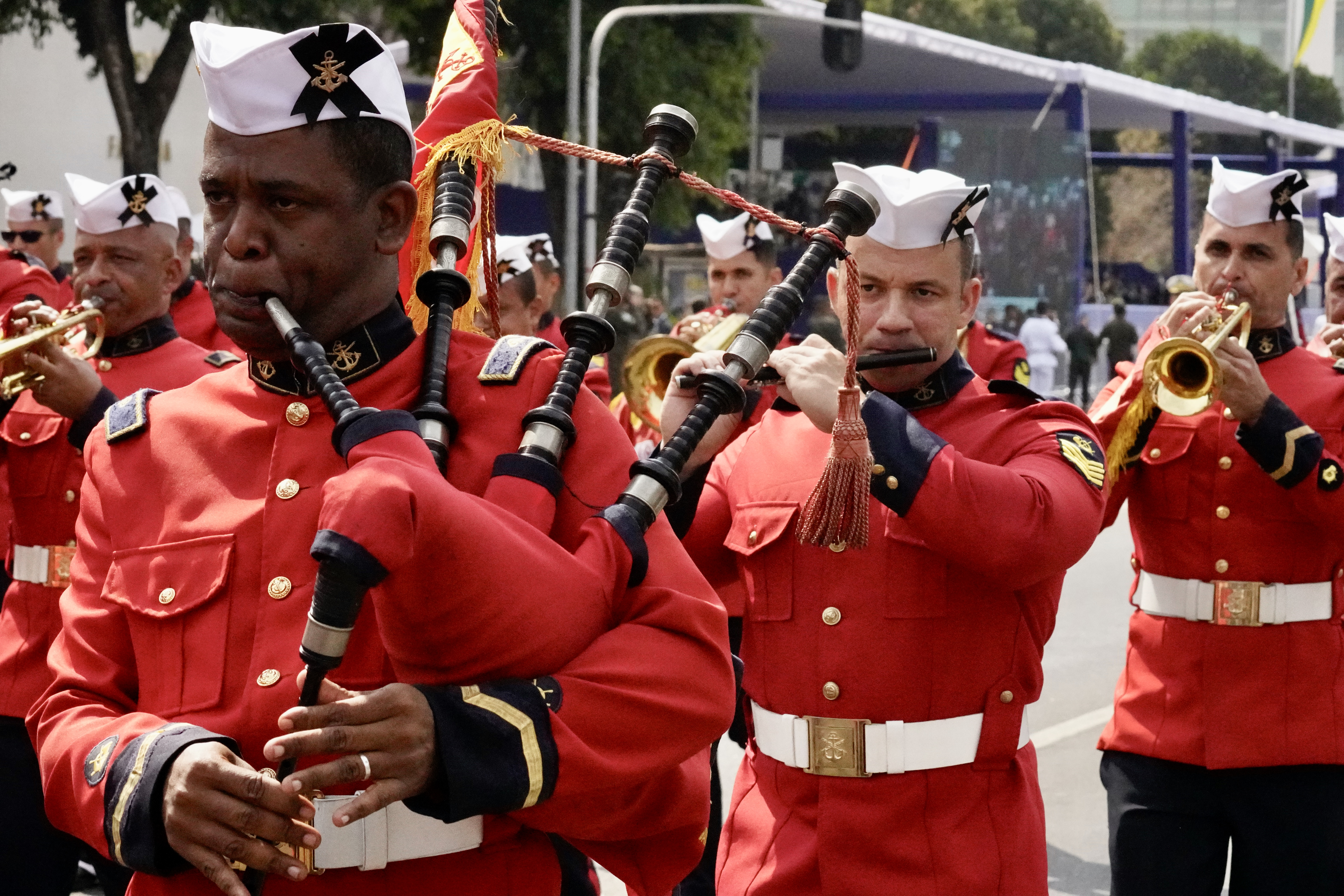
The CFN's martial band in bagpipes and garrison cap

Marines prefer not to be called sailors, as their distinctive ethos is equal parts land- and sea-based. Their speciality, direct combat in a squad or platoon, is held to embody values of bravery, courage and heroism, classical infantry virtues in other forces; anthropologist Celso Castro gave the "proximity between [Army] and marine infantrymen" as an example of "horizontal approaches between the spirits of sections of different forces". Esprit de corps (espírito de corpo), officially defined as a "mode of thought and a belief which polarize men in the search of common objectives", is deemed a sentiment of utmost importance.

In more than two centuries of history, the Marine Corps has gathered traditions representative of Brazilian geography, society and culture. Its terminology is not identical to the USMC's and can be complex to translate into the English language. The Navy prizes its tradition and venerates heroes of the past, usually admirals and higher officers. In the case of the marines, those are admirals Milcíades Portela Alves and Sylvio de Camargo; the latter is recognized as the CFN's patron.

The Navy's official page presents as "symbols and costumes of the marines" their coat of arms, standard, emblem (rifles crossed under an anchor) in unit badges and uniforms, Scottish-style garrison cap (gorro de fita), Rubia-colored parade uniform, Prussian-style historical helmet and "Adsumus" (Latin for "here we are") motto.Their bold red parade uniforms stand out from the Navy's usually discreet aesthetic. The Marine Corps Band is known for its bagpipes.

=== Public relations ===
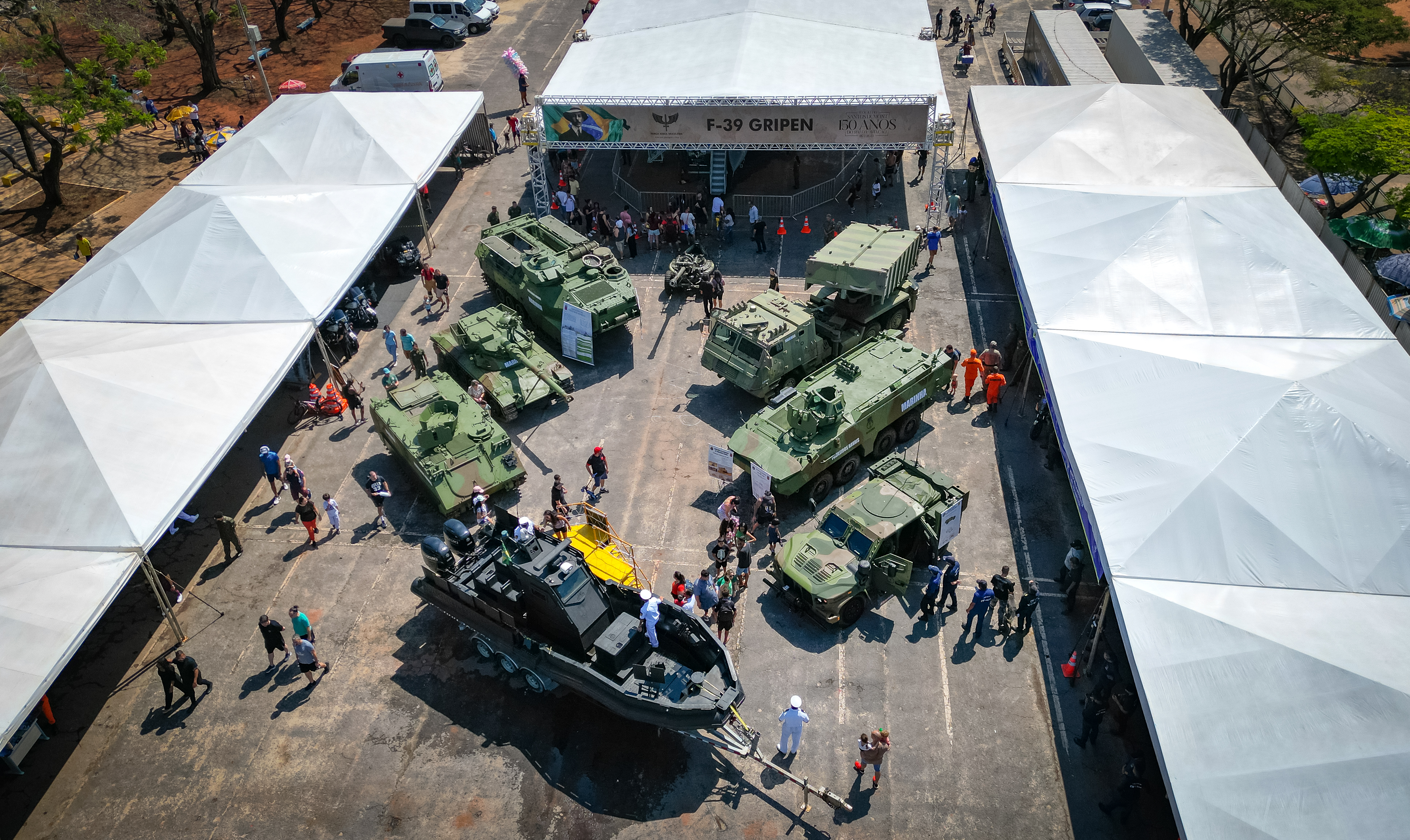
Armor and artillery showcased in Brasília

The CFN portrays itself to society as a vanguard organization with modern equipment, demanding training and high morale. It invests in its image among the civilian population through humanitarian and civic aid and operational demonstrations open to the public. The most sympathetic component is the martial band. Historical items are exposed at the Marine Corps museum within the Fortress of São José.

Brazilian society at large is indifferent to bottom-ranking seamen and marine privates, according to historian Anderson da Silva Almeida, who discusses the case of the death of a recruit in the Soldier Training Course in March 2010. This event was largely unnoticed in the media. The Navy did publish an official statement, which suggests it is more open as an institution than in the past. (Note: "According to the note published by the Navy, the young man had suffered a sudden illness during military physical training, and after receiving medical care from the Instruction Center's own team, was taken to an emergency care unit, where he passed away. However, days before, he had revealed to relatives that visited him that he had felt ill thrice during training and even fainted. In the same occasion, Adonai allegedly said that on Saturday, on the 27th of February, "his platoon had been woken up with tear gas grenades in their quarters". According to information released by a physician, the young man suffered a pulmonary hemorrhage. The Navy disclosed the opening of an inquest on the case".) According to observations by the Sociedade Militar magazine in the Navy's official page in Twitter, reactions to posts regarding the Marine Corps were positive from 2006 to 2018, confirming an image of efficiency. In the following years the tone shifted to scorn, political disappointment and ignorance on the duties and limits of the military, which the publication blamed on the military's involvement in politics from 2018 onward.

== Organization ==
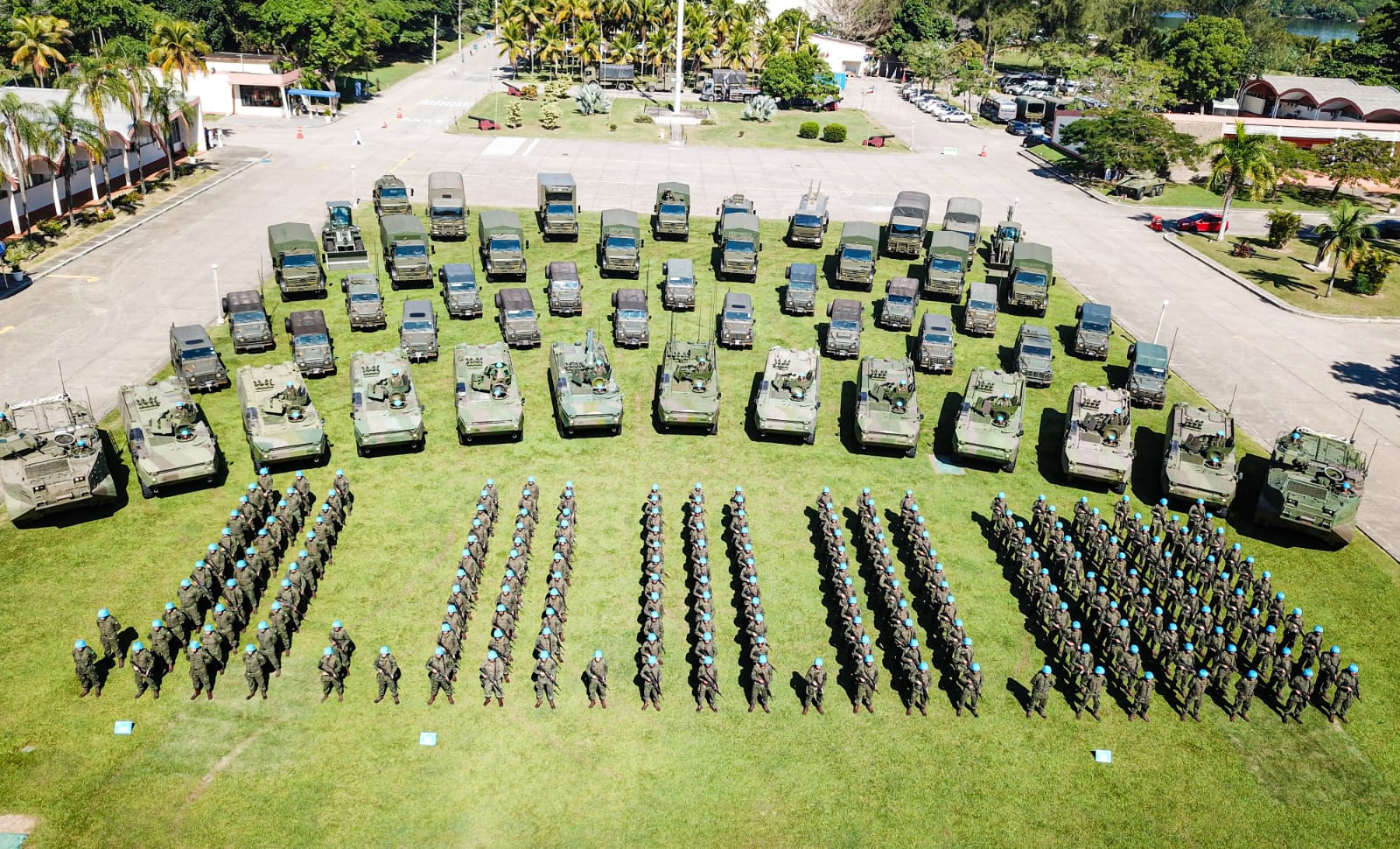
Platoons and vehicles of a peacekeeping Marine Operational Group

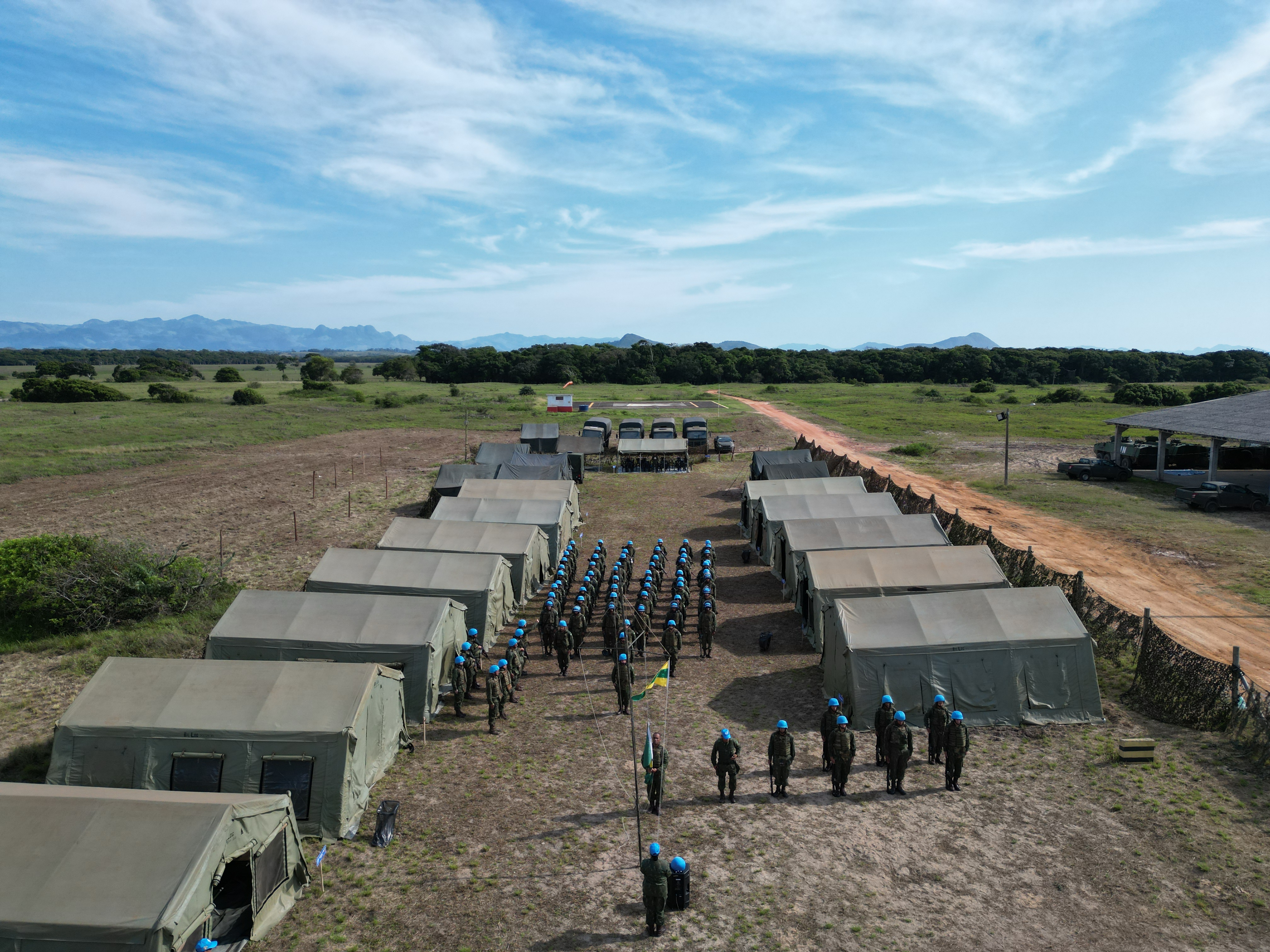
Camped marines in a peacekeeping exercise

The Corps can be split in two sectors, a technical-administrative, management and doctrinary branch centered on the Marine Corps General Command (Comando-Geral do Corpo de Fuzileiros Navais, CGCFN), and an operational branch, which consists of the Fleet Marine Force (Força de Fuzileiros da Esquadra, FFE) and district Groups and Battalions. Operational units are not assigned to the CGCFN, which is a sector direction department under the Navy Command, while those units are either directly under the Naval Operations Command (Comando de Operações Navais, CON) or under Naval Districts (Distritos Navais, DN), for other units. DNs are subordinated to CON. Marine bases are concentrated in the state of Rio de Janeiro, where the Fleet is also headquartered.

At the operational and tactical levels, the Corps acts through the Marine Operational Group (Grupamento Operativo de Fuzileiros Navais, GptOpFuzNav). Inspired on the USMC's Marine Air-Ground Task Force, this is a task-based organization created for a specific mission. Its personnel and materiel are mobilized from several units. Depending on its size, it is classified as an Amphibious Element (300 marines), Amphibious Unit (2,000 marines) or Amphibious Brigade (7,000 marines); the latter two are comparable to the USMC's Marine Expeditionary Unit and Marine Expeditionary Brigade.

An Operational Group consists of a Command Component (Componente de Comando, CteC), Ground Combat Component (Componente de Combate Terrestre, CCT), Air Combat Component (Componente de Combate Aéreo, CteCA) and Combat Service Support Component (Componente de Apoio de Serviços ao Combate, CASC). The CCT is its core and fields most of its strength. An Operational Group may have more than one CCT, CteCA or CASC, but always conserves its unity of command. There is never one Group within another; smaller Groups are absorbed by the larger Groups they reinforce. Examples of specialized Operational Groups include the Civil Defense Support and Peacekeeping Quick Reaction Force (QRF) groups. The latter, composed of 220 marines, was certified in 2022 as a level 3 QRF in the UN's Peacekeeping Capability Readiness System. This is the highest level in the system and the only Brazilian unit to have reached it by then.

The 2023 Maritime Defense Strategy establishes that in the following two decades the Navy should have assets for a "Projection Force", for which the Marine Corps would provide an Amphibious Unit. The Fleet would need a fixed-wing capable aircraft carrier, three amphibious assault ships, three LCUs and six LCMs, and Naval Aviation would need eight helicopters for transport and another six for escort and fire support.

=== General Command ===
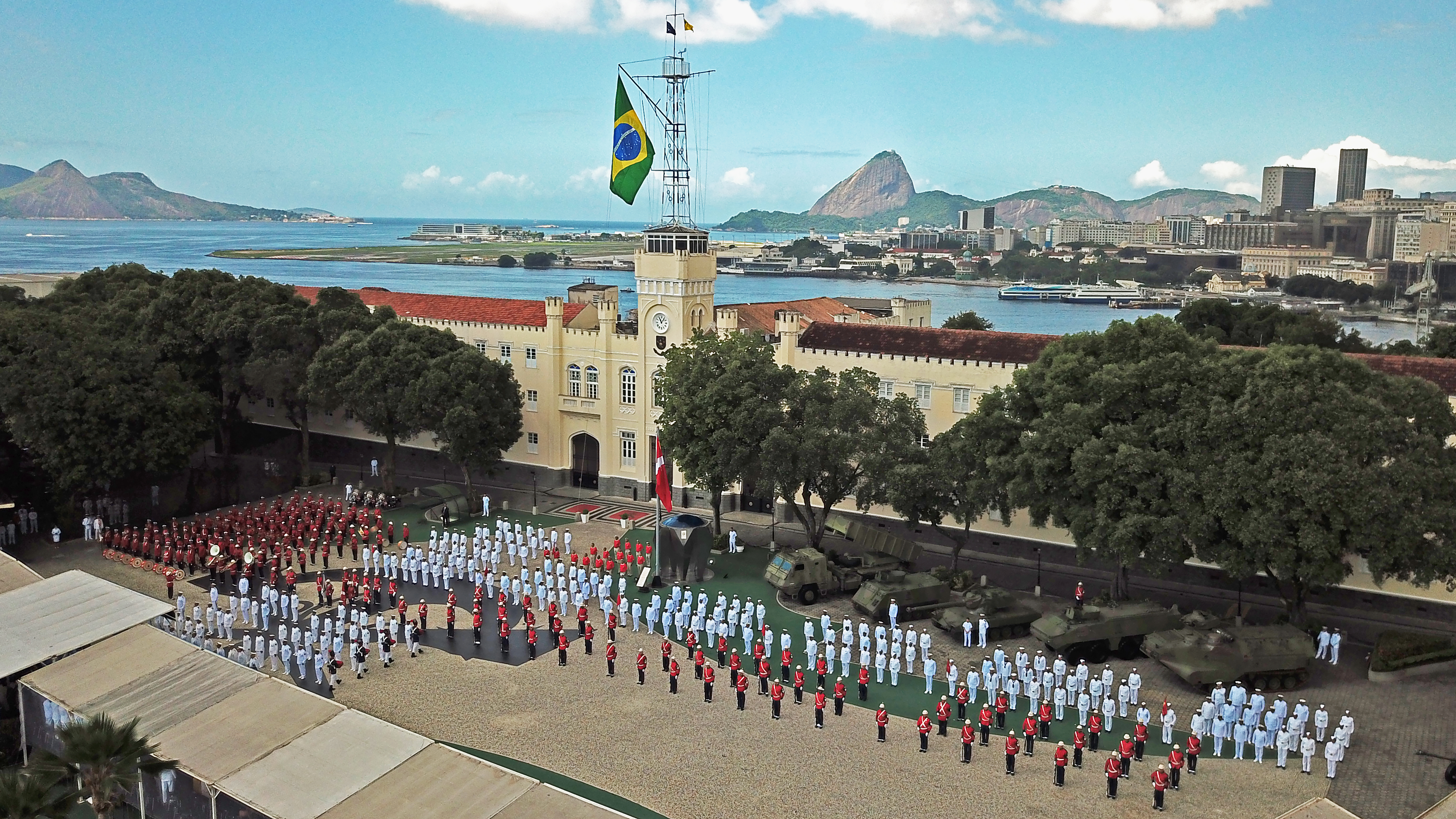
Ceremony at the Fortress of São José, CGCFN headquarters

The Marine Corps General Command is headquartered at the São José Fortress, Cobras Island, and manages human resources, material, research and doctrine for the CFN's operational sector. Since 1981 its commander has no direct involvement in the FFE's deployment. This reorganization introduced the General Commander to the Admiralty, where he partakes in the Navy's high-level decisionmaking.

The General Command controls the Navy Sports Commission, the CEFAN, the Navy Chemical, Biological, Nuclear and Radiological Protection and Defense Command (CProtDefNBQRM), the Marine Corps Training and Doctrinary Development Command, the Marine Personnel Command and Marine Materiel Command. All instruction centers are in this structure. The CProtDefNBQRM is responsible for the Naval Battalion and Marine Police Battalion. The Naval Battalion is a financial administration, personnel, security and general services support unit for the General Command, Personnel Command and Materiel Command.

The Marine Police Battalion, formerly Police Company of the Naval Battalion, (Note: The current designation was given in 2025.) is a military police in the generic sense — an internal Armed Forces police, unrelated to the Polícia Militar state police forces. This is not the only military police in the Navy: the FFE has another company within its Littoral Division, and other companies or platoons service regional battalions. (Note: See the cases of Manaus, Rio de Janeiro, Salvador, Brasília, and Natal.) Marine policemen can be identified by brassards with "SP" (Serviço de Polícia, Police Service) lettering.

=== Fleet Marine Force ===
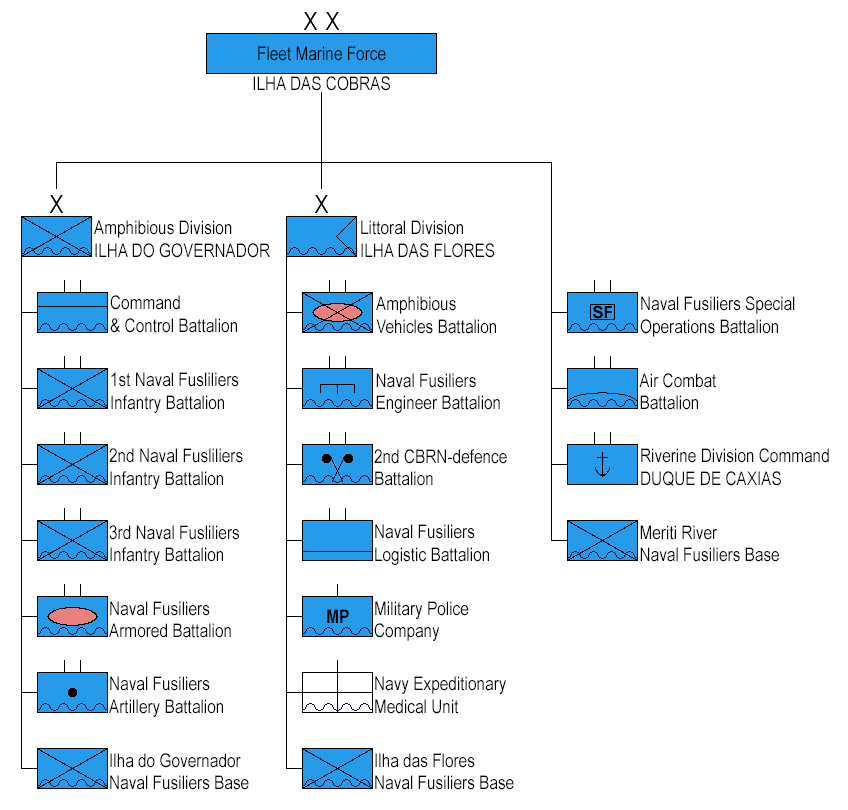
Fleet Marine Force organization as of 2026

The FFE is the landing force in amphibious operations, summarized by the Seaforth World Naval Review as "the seagoing component of the naval infantry". The Fleet, which it supports but has no administrative connection, could be called the Navy's "blue-water" component. (Note: The Brazilian Navy is not considered one of the world's few blue-water navies, fully capable of overseas power projection, although this status is its long-term ambition.) The FFE commands infantry, artillery, engineering, command and control, amphibious and land-based armor, special operations and military logistics assets, for a total of six thousand marines in service in 2017. There is no rigid distinction between arms, cadres and services as in the Army. The infantry is usually the only ground combat arm, with the other elements classified in planning and employment as combat support (e.g. armor and artillery) or combat service support.

With an expeditionary nature, its structure seeks to hasten the transition between an administrative and combat organization. The FFE's command is headquartered at the Caxias Meriti Naval Complex, where its command, control and administration needs are handled by one of its subordinate units, the Rio Meriti Naval Base. Its other components are the Amphibious Division, which comprises most combat units, the Littoral Division, Air Combat Battalion, Marine Special Operations Battalion and Riverine Division Command. The latter, formerly known as the Landing Troop Command, (Note: The current designation was given in 2025.) has no independent units assigned and provides Command Components to Marine Operational Groups.

==== Amphibious Division ====
The Amphibious Division is headquartered at Governador Island. It controls the Governador Island Marine Base and the following battalions: 1st, 2nd and 3rd Marine Infantry (Batalhão de Infantaria de Fuzileiros Navais, BtlInfFuzNav), Marine Artillery (Batalhão de Artilharia de Fuzileiros Navais, BtlArtFuzNav), Command and Control (Batalhão de Comando e Controle, BtlCmdoCt) and Marine Armor (Batalhão de Blindados de Fuzileiros, BtlBldFuzNav). Expansion plans would install a 4th infantry battalion in Rio de Janeiro and a 5th and 6th in the 2nd Fleet Marine Force.

The standard infantry weapons are the M16A2 rifle, FN Minimi, FN MAG and Browning M2HB machine guns, 60 and 81-millimeter mortars, AT4 recoilless weapons and MAX 1.2 AC anti-tank guided missiles. Artillery fields L118 105 mm howitzers, 120 mm mortars and ASTROS 2020 multiple rocket launchers. (Note: The International Institute for Strategic Studies (IISS (2024, p. 418)) accounted for 65 artillery pieces in service in 2024, including 18 M101 howitzers, but this model was ignored by the National Defense White Paper's list (LBDN (2012, p. 95)). It also included six M114 155 mm howitzers, which are confirmed to be out of service as of 2025 (Moralez & Braga (2025, p. 58)).) The Command and Control Battalion has communications and electronic warfare assets.

The Armor Battalion fields the CFN's main armored vehicles, with the important exception of the Amphibious Assault Vehicle, which is assigned to the Littoral Division. Its inventory consists of 17 SK-105 light tanks, one 4KH7FA Greif armored recovery vehicle, 30 M113 family tracked armored personnel carriers (APCs), 30 Piranha III family wheeled APCs and 12 JLTV light armored vehicles. The 2009 PAEMB had called for the procurement of 26 tanks until 2019, 72 wheeled APCs until 2022 and 72 tracked APCs until 2029. (Note: Comparing the IISS reports from 2009 (ISBN 978-1-138-45254-1, p. 68) and 2022, (ISBN 978-1-032-27900-8, p. 401), the only change in the inventory was an expansion of the Piranha IIIC fleet from 12 to 30 units.)

Components of the Amphibious Division

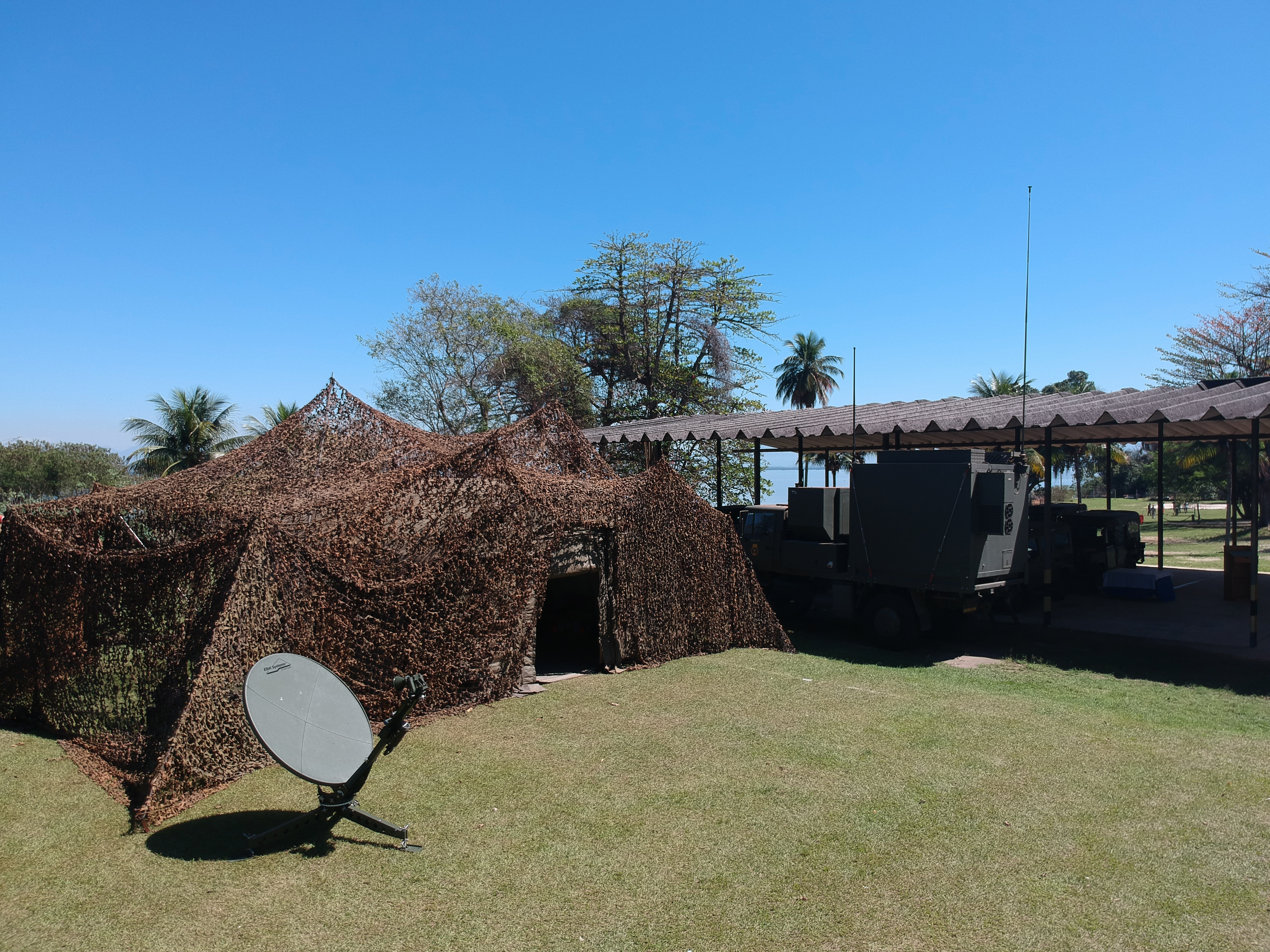
Command and Control

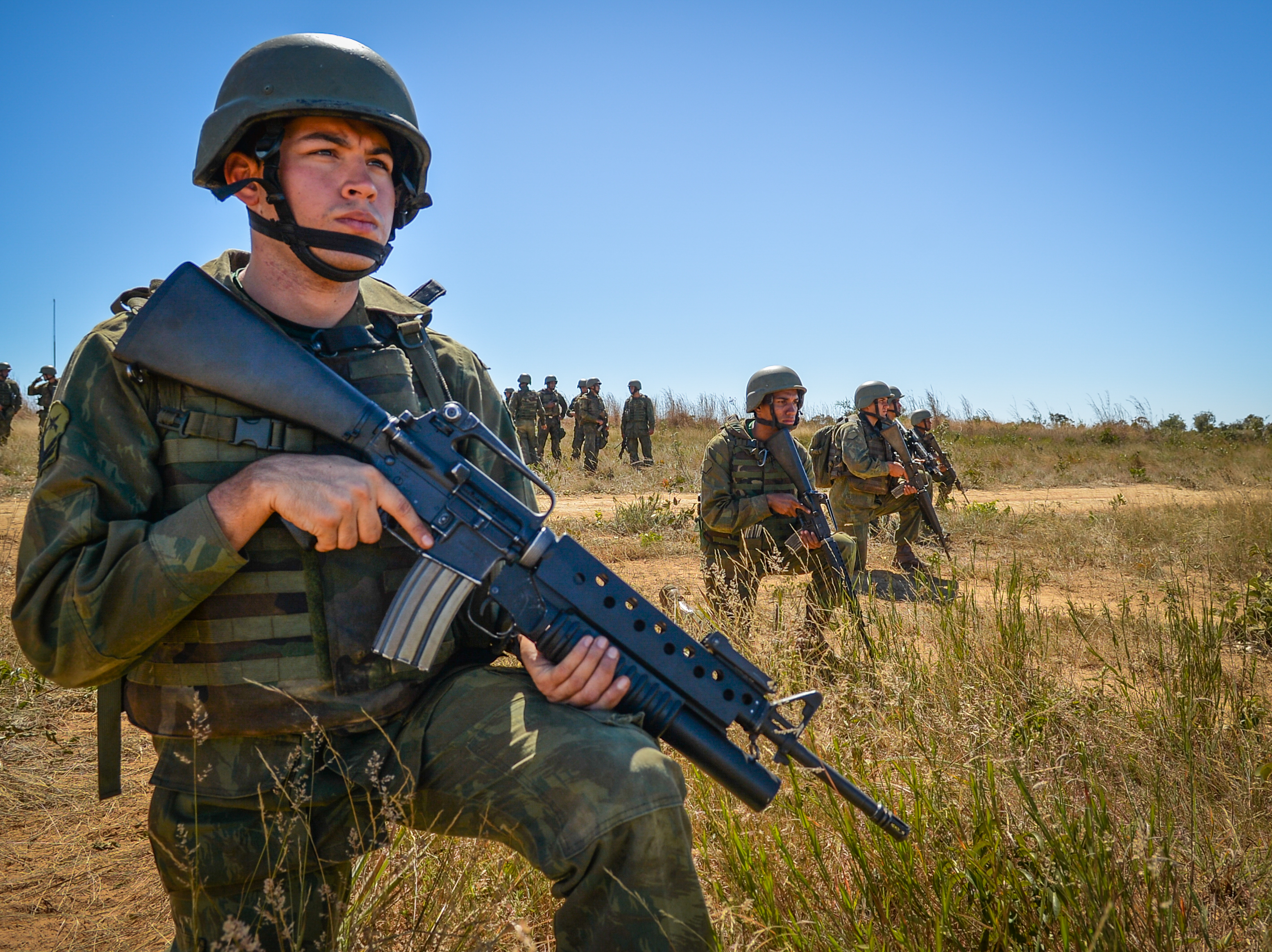
Infantry

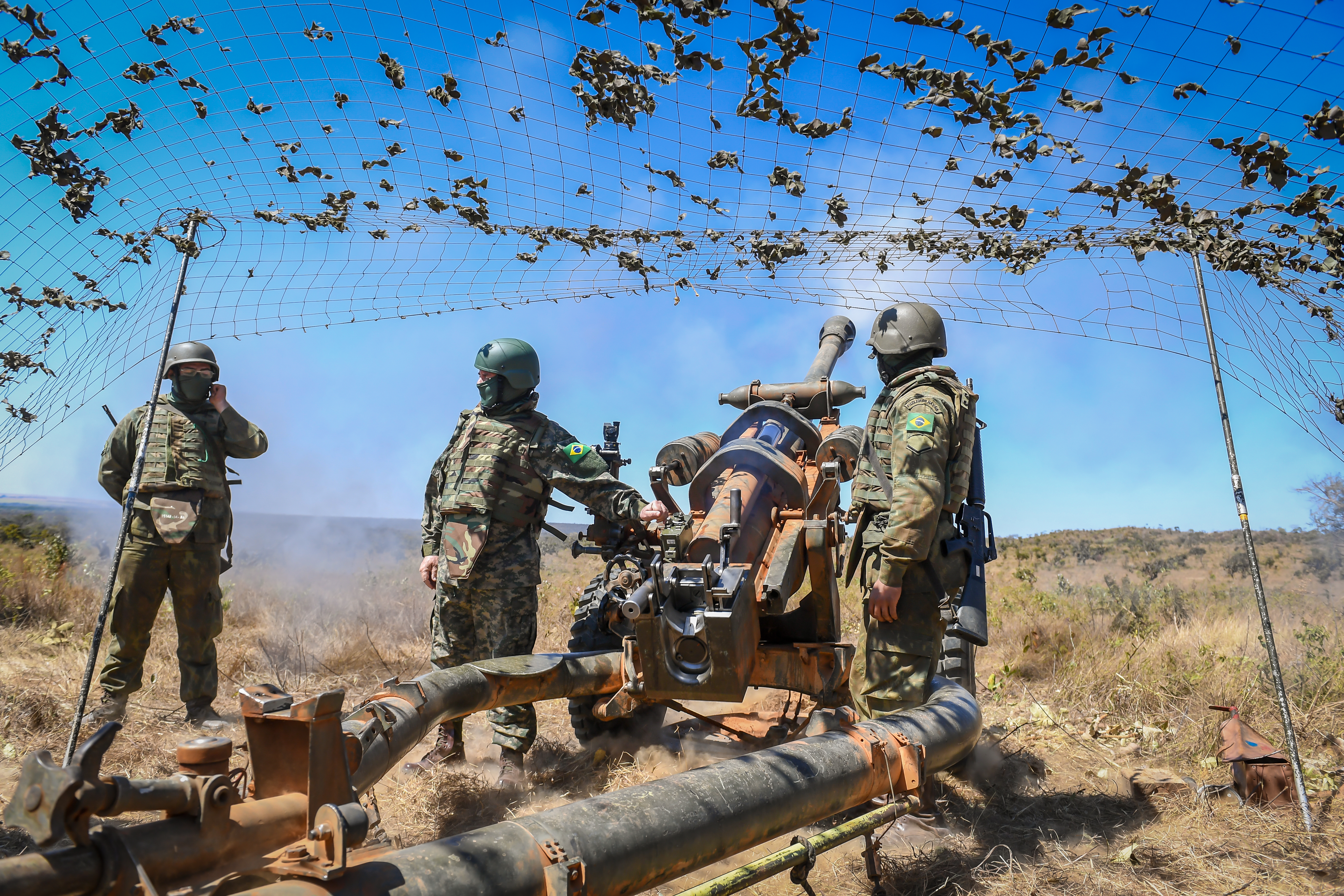
Artillery

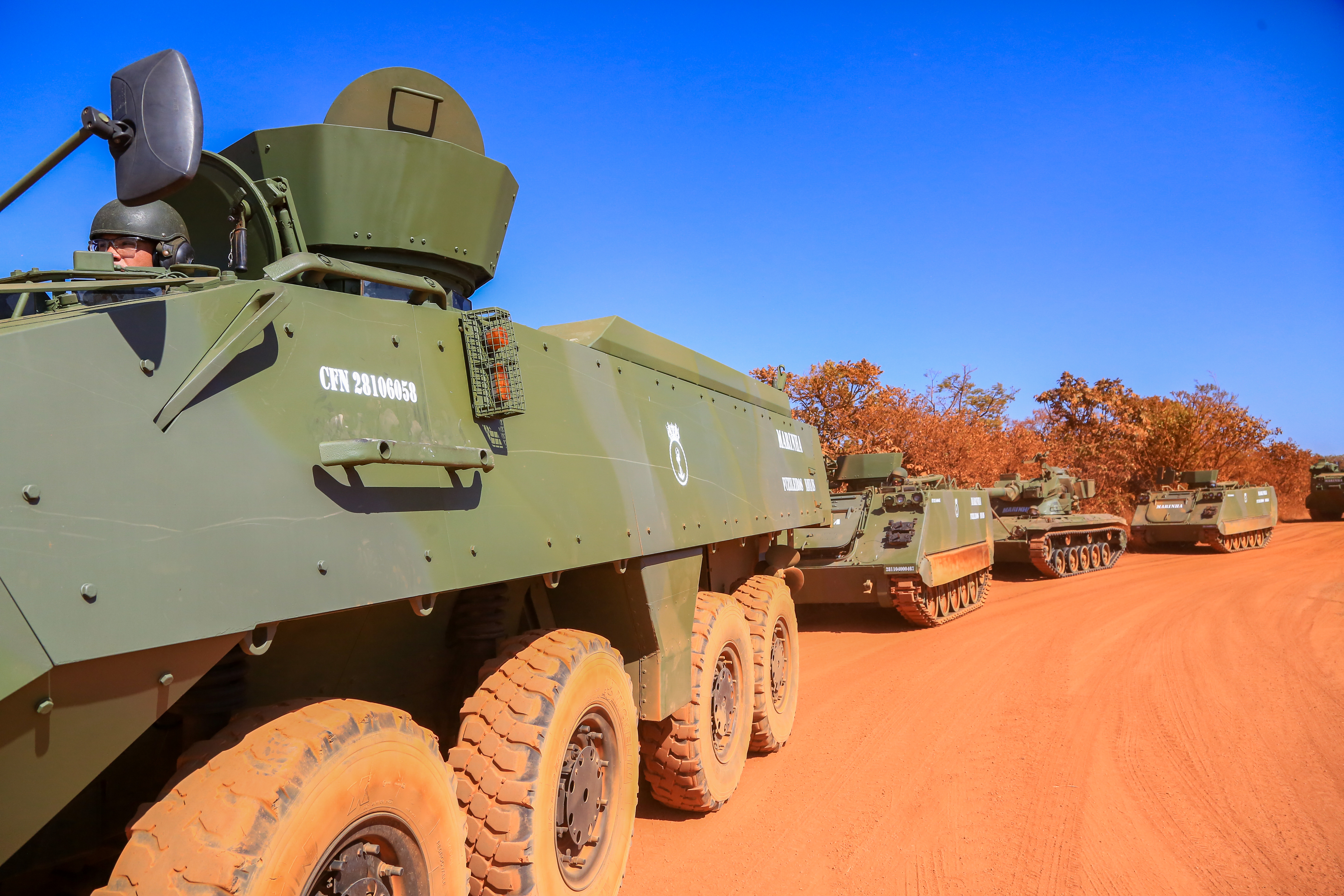
Armor

==== Littoral Division ====
The Littoral Division Divisão Litorânea, formerly Reinforcement Troop Tropa de Reforço, (Note: The current designation was given in 2025.) is headquartered at Flores Island. It focuses on support assets for Operational Groups, commanding the Flores Island Marine Base, several battalions — Marine Combat Engineers (Batalhão de Engenharia de Fuzileiros Navais, BtlEngFuzNav), Marine Logistics (Batalhão Logístico de Fuzileiros Navais, BtlLogFuzNav), Amphibious Vehicles (Batalhão de Viaturas Anfíbias, BtlVtrAnf) and Chemical, Biological, Radiological and Nuclear Protection and Defense (Batalhão de Defesa e Proteção Nuclear, Química, Biológica e Radiológica, BtlProtDefNQBR) — the Police Company (CiaPol) and Navy Expeditionary Medical Unit (Unidade Médica Expedicionária da Marinha, UMEM). The Amphibious Vehicles Battalion operates the American-made Assault Amphibious Vehicle, locally designated Carro sobre Lagarta Anfíbio (CLAnf), which is responsible for ship to shore movement of the assault elements of an amphibious operation. Its 49 AAVs are the largest inventory of this vehicle on the Southern Hemisphere. The 2009 PAEMB had planned for an even larger number (78).

Components of the Littoral Division

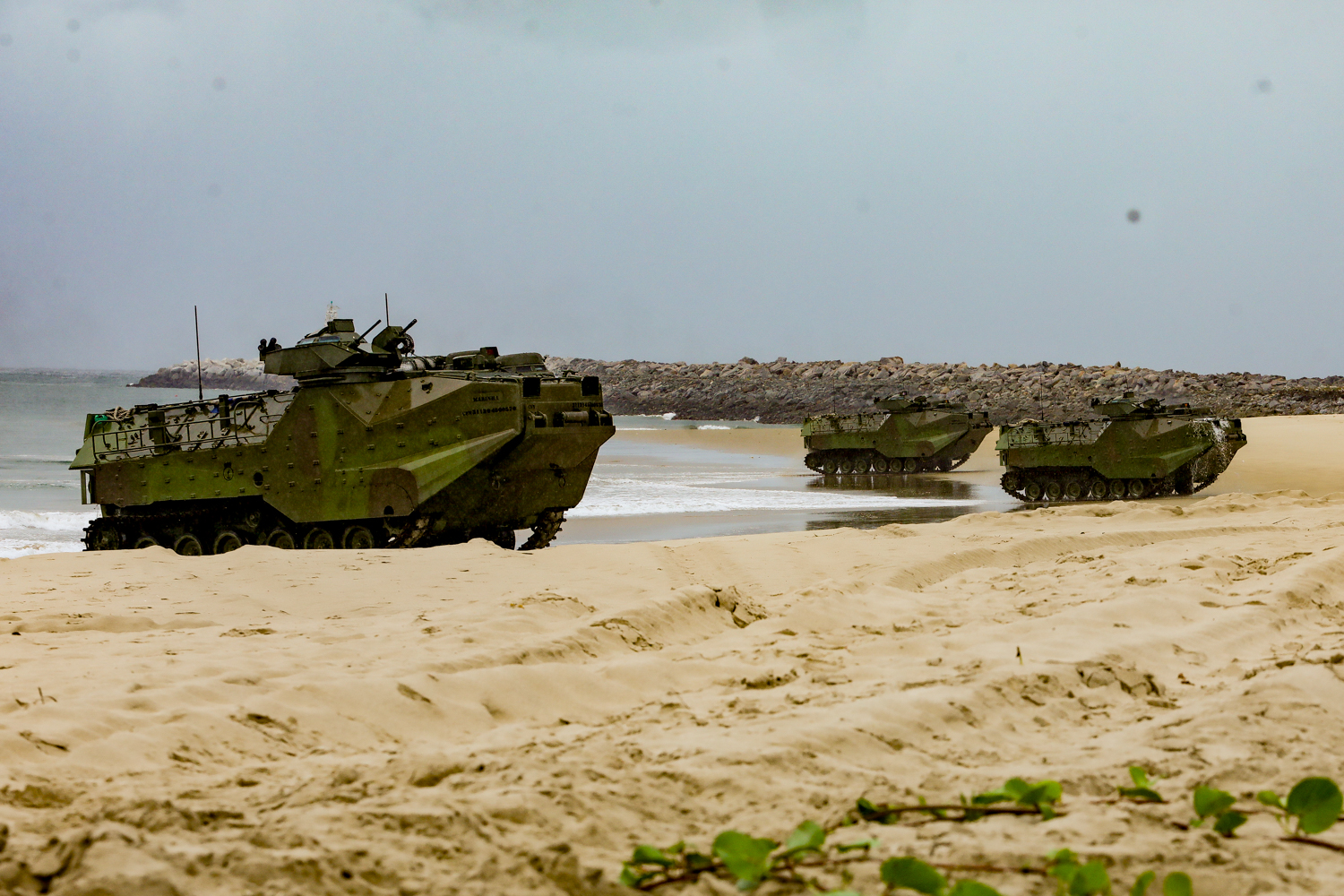
Amphibious Vehicles

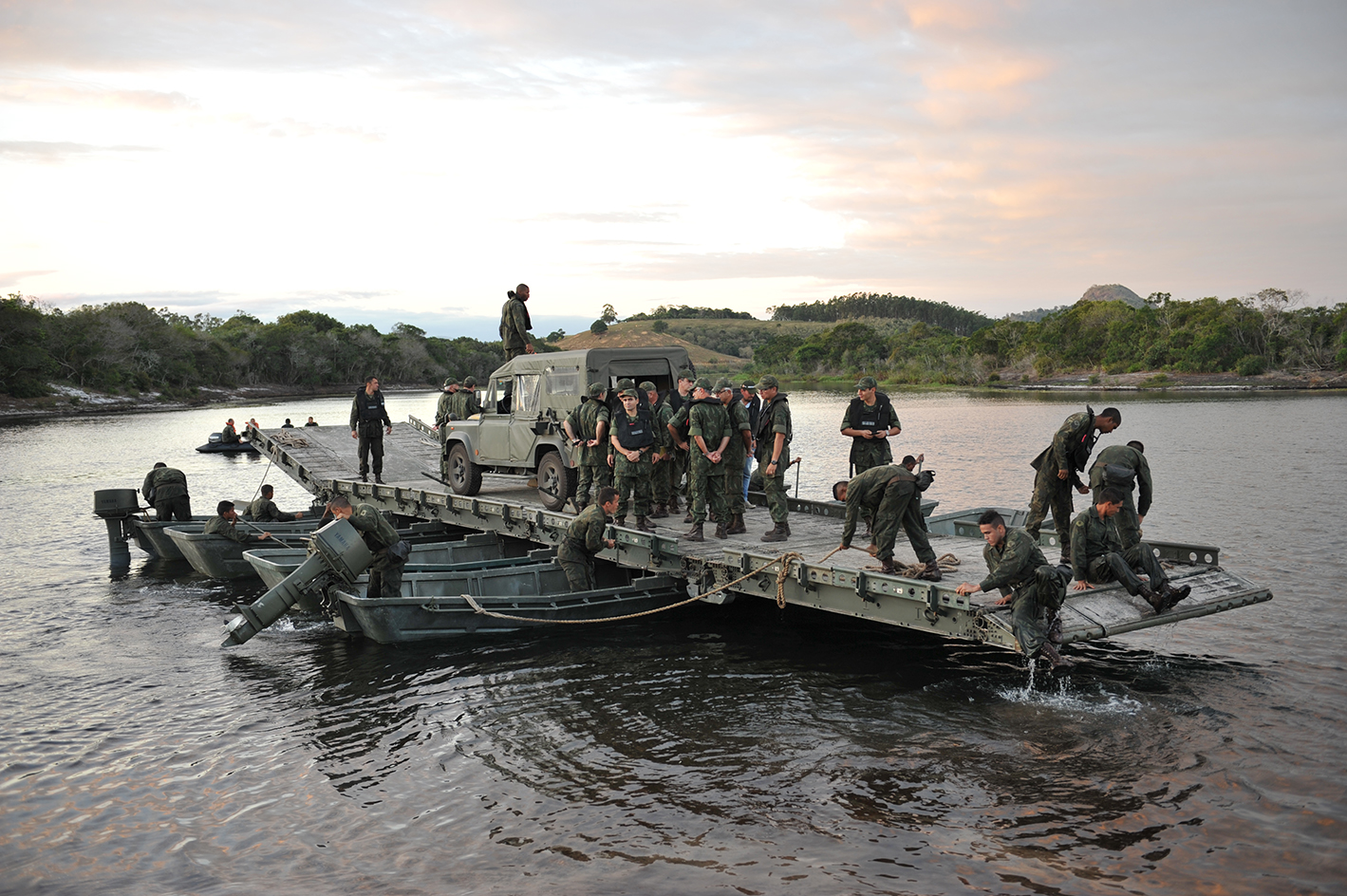
Engineering

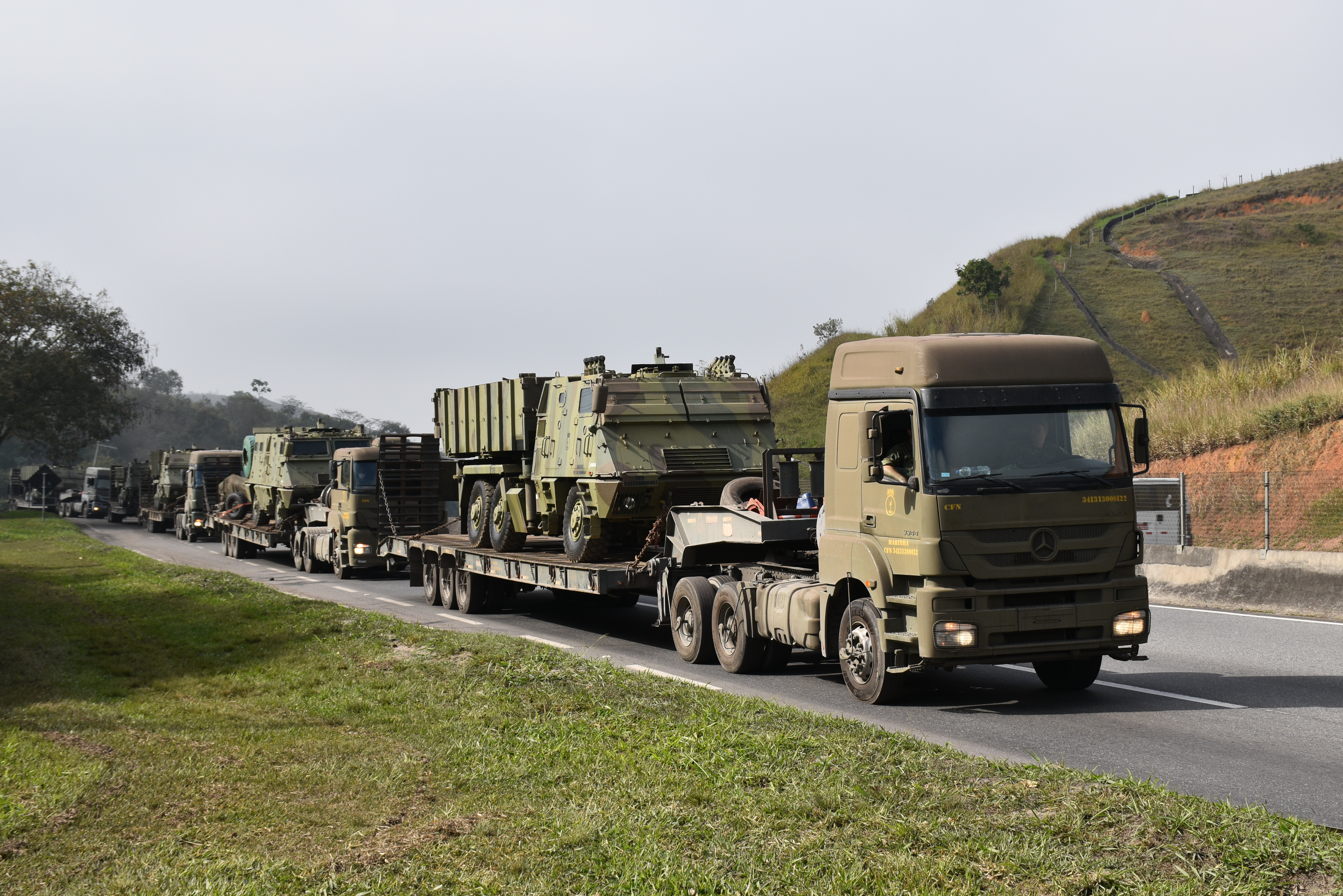
Logistics

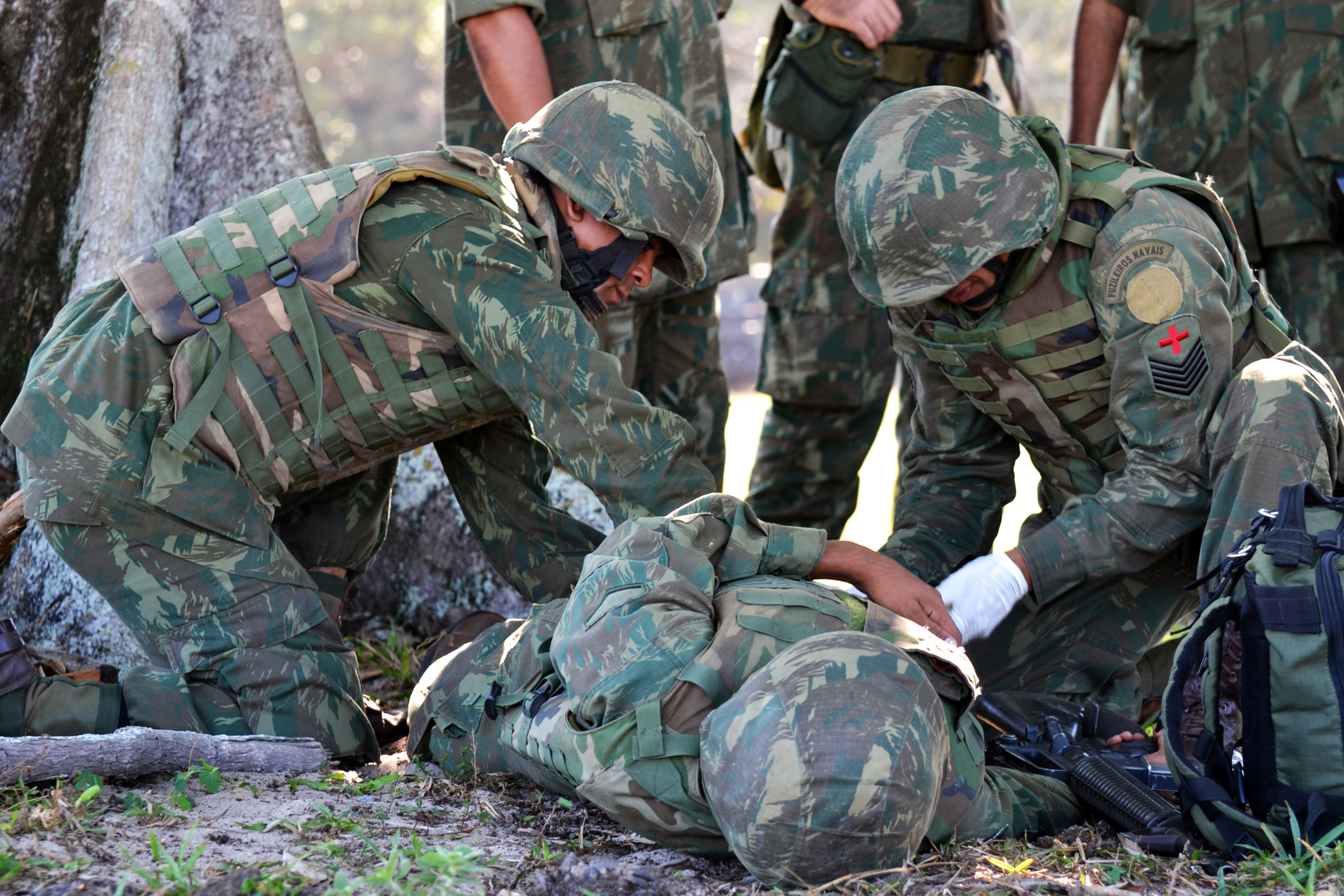
Medical Unit

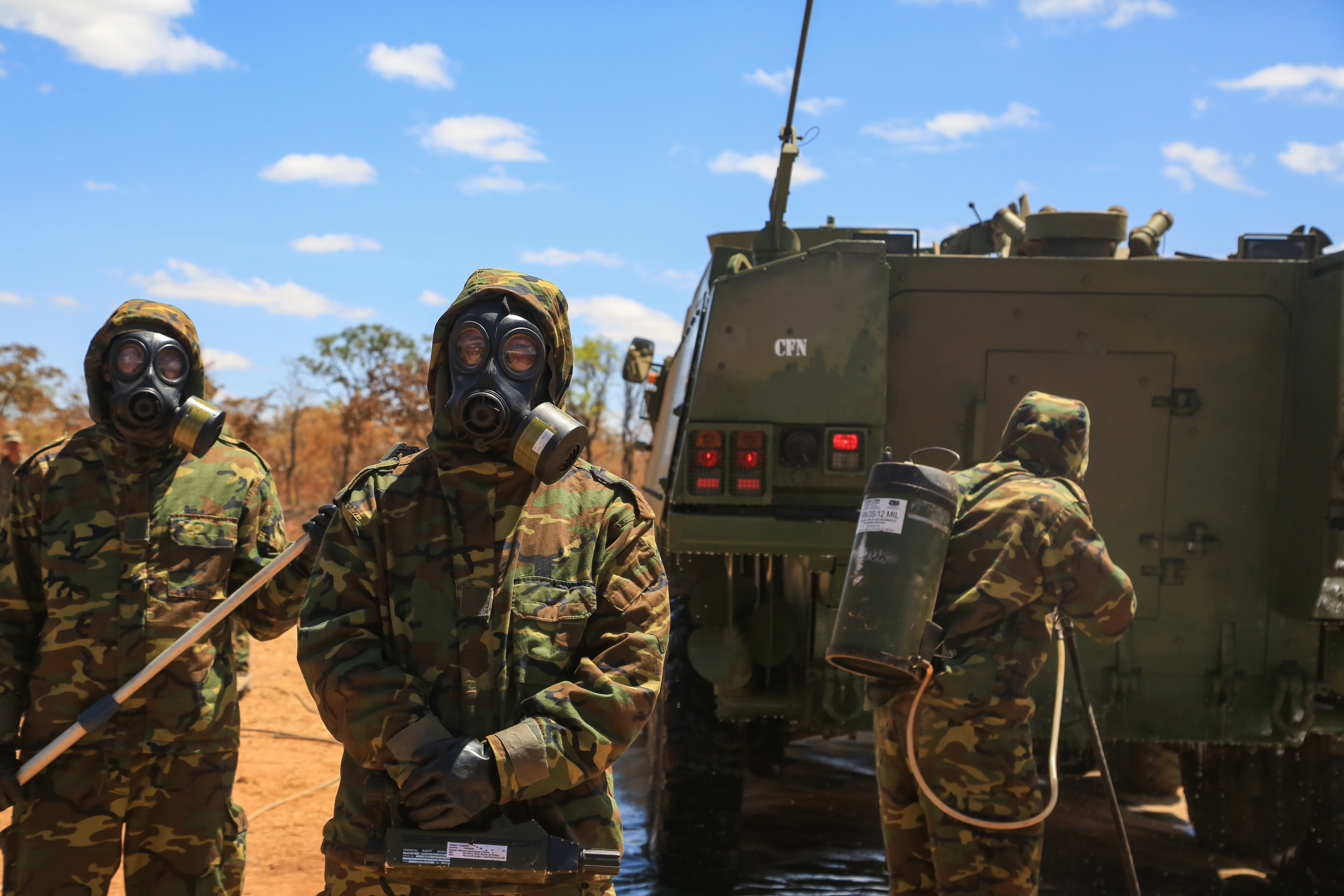
CBRN Defense

==== Air Combat and Special Operations ====
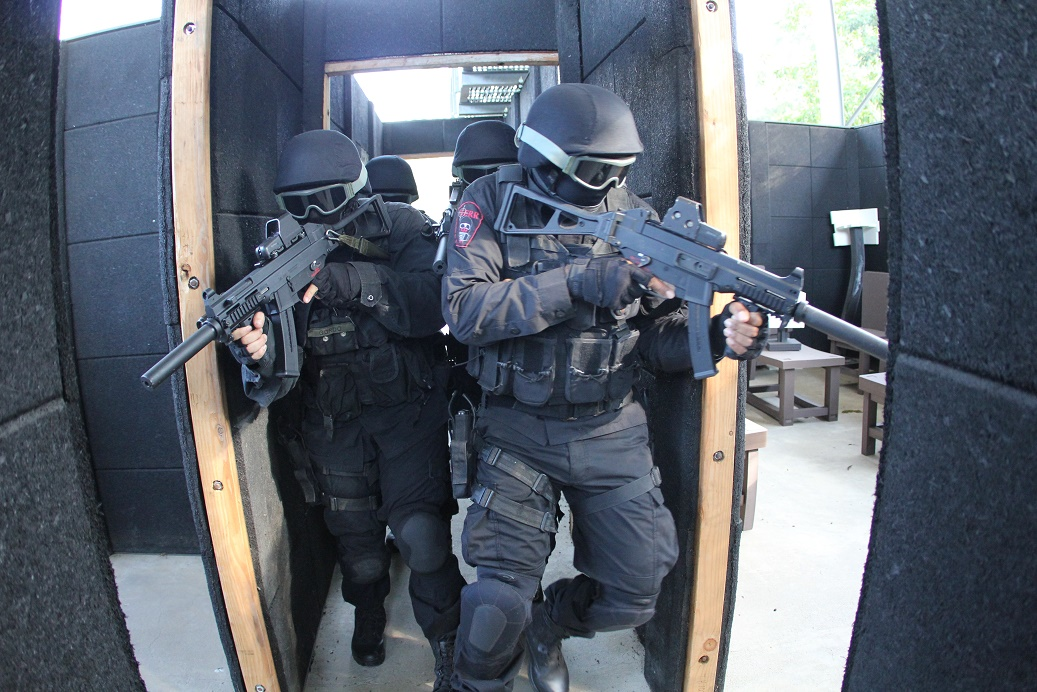
Amphibious Commandos on installation recapture training

The Air Combat Battalion (Batalhão de Combate Aéreo, BtlCmbAe) is the usual core of an Operational Group's Air Combat Component. It coordinates any Naval Aviation aircraft assigned to its Component and may operate from its ship or deploy on land. It is equipped with anti-aircraft artillery — Bofors L/70 BOFI-R 40 mm guns and Mistral man-portable air defense missiles — and unmanned aerial vehicles for reconnaissance. Its strength was 217 marines, out of a nominal total of 280, in 2016.

Marines prepared for high-risk, high-value operations, known as Amphibious Commandos, are part of the Marine Special Operations Battalion (Batalhão de Operações Especiais de Fuzileiros Navais, BtlOpEspFuzNav), or Tonelero Battalion. It has a special operations company for each of three roles: reconnaissance, commando actions and counterterrorism. Its equipment is diverse and specialized, and its recruitment and training criteria are more demanding. An Amphibious Commando's full training may take two years or more. They exercise annually in several Brazilian biomes and attend courses in the Army, such as the airborne, jungle warfare and mountain operations courses, and even abroad. Their battalion is one of two special operations units in the Navy, alongside the Fleet Corps GRUMEC combat divers. Their main distinction is the standard operational environment, usually on land for amphibious commandos and at sea for combat divers.

=== District units ===
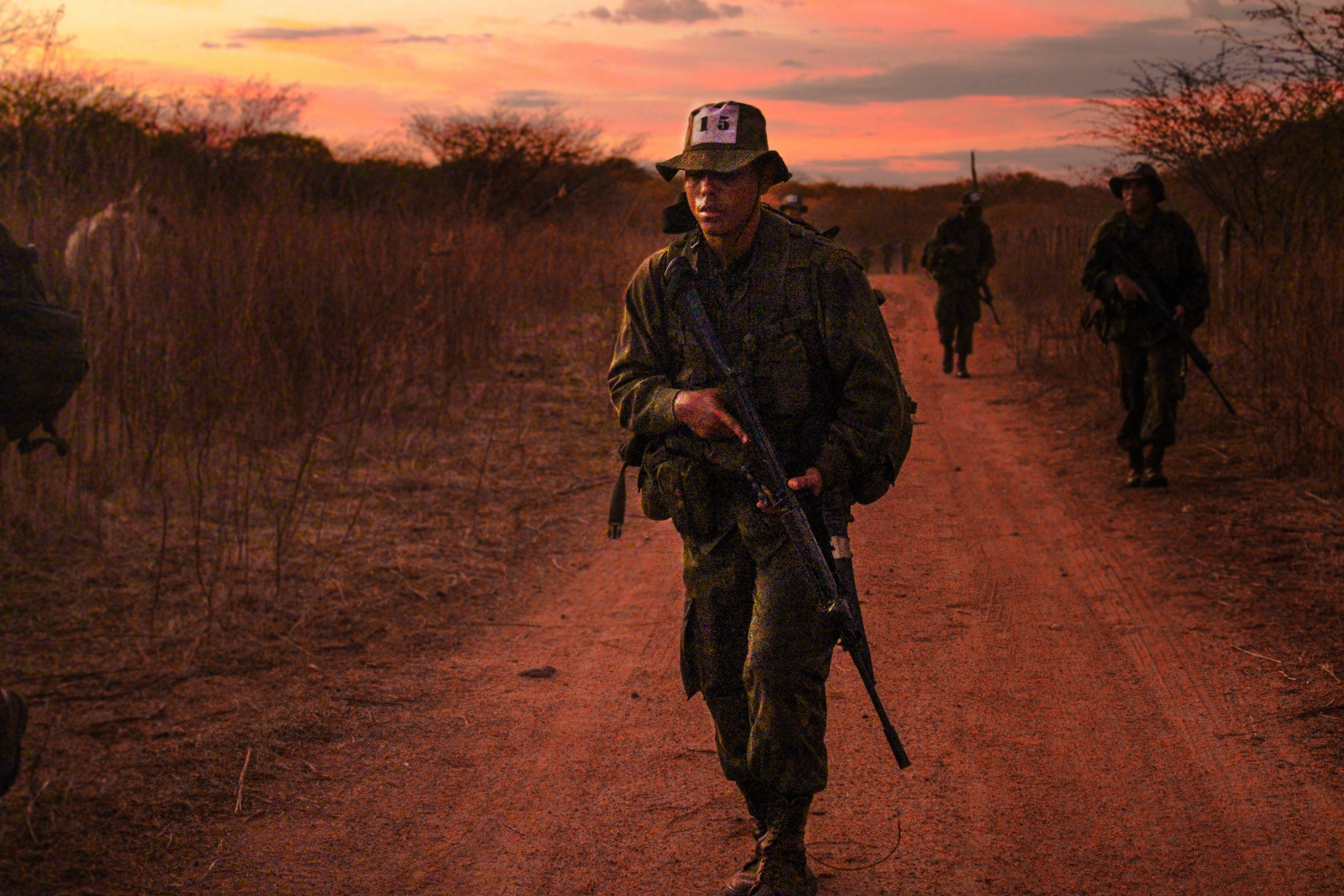
3rd Littoral Operations Battalion in the caatinga environment

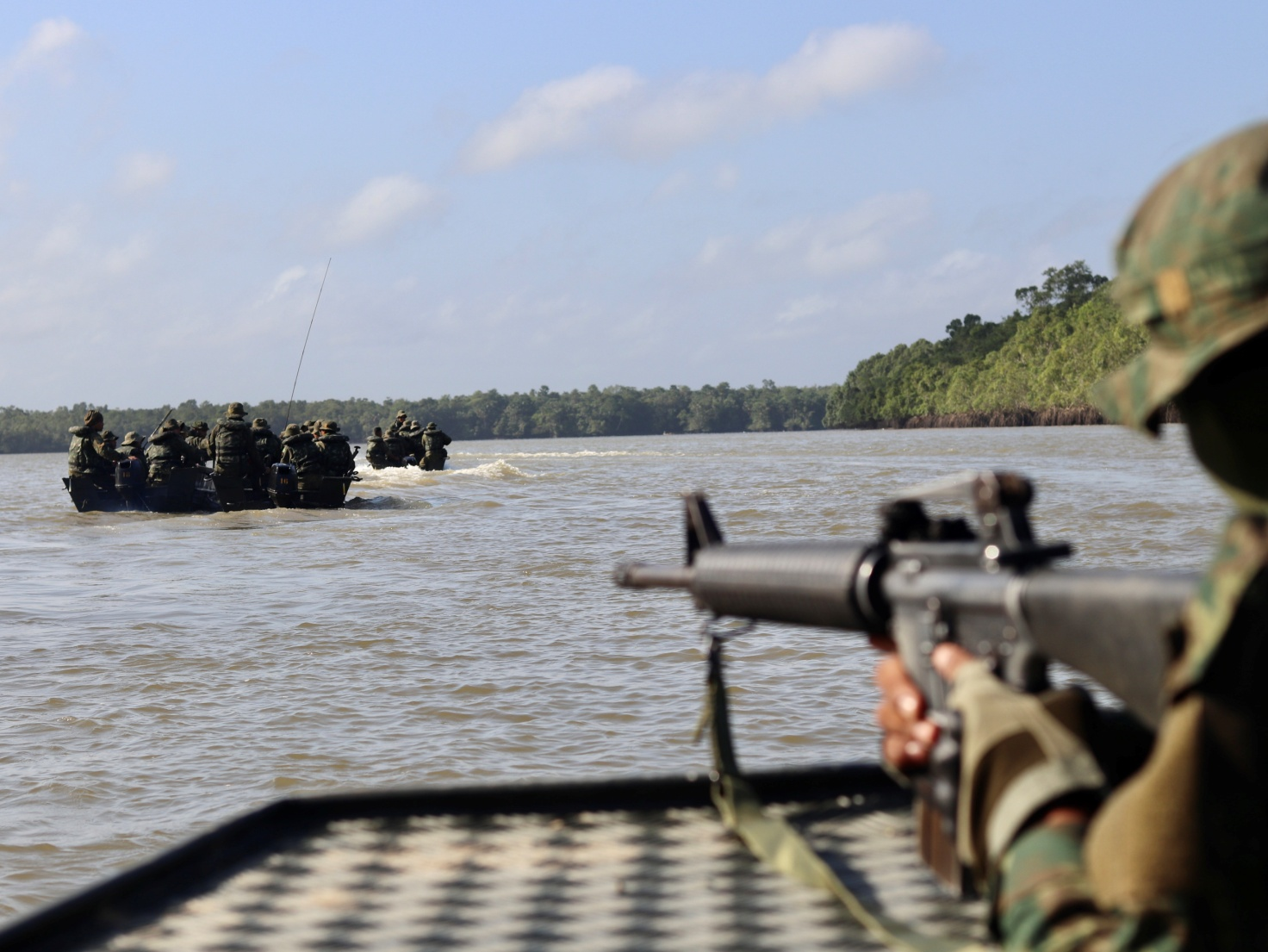
2nd Riverine Operations Battalion

Each Naval District (DN) has a unit of marines, typically at its headquarters. (Note: The arrangement of one unit in each district headquarters was confirmed between 1976, when marine units in Uruguaiana, Santos and Recife were disbanded, and 1985, when new groups were installed in Rio Grande and Manaus. The 8th Naval District, created in 1997, had no unit until the revival of the Santos Marine Group in 2023. As this District is headquartered in the city of São Paulo, its unit's location is an exception.) Five districts have Litoral Operations Battalions (Batalhão de Operações Litorâneas, BtlOpLitFN): Rio de Janeiro (1st DN, 1st battalion), Salvador (2nd DN, 2nd battalion), Natal (3rd DN, 3rd battalion), Santos (8th DN, 4th battalion) and Rio Grande (5th DN, 5th battalion). Three Districts have Riverine Operations Battalions (Batalhões de Operações Ribeirinhas, BtlOpRib), the 1st in the 9th DN, Manaus, the 2nd in the 4th DN, Belém, and the 3rd in the 6th DN, Ladário. (Note: All riverine and littoral battalions were originally designated as Marine Groups (Grupamento de Fuzileiros Navais, GptFN) until later reforms.)

Littoral battalions may defend ports and installations and provide ship security teams. Units in Brasília and Natal hold courses in their local terrain types, the Cerrado and Caatinga. Each unit may reinforce the FFE or be reinforced by it. They may not be enough to cover the entire coast and other areas of interest to the Navy, but this is compensated by the FFE's mobility.

The 1st and 2nd Riverine Operations Battalions are the Marine Corps' presence in the Amazon, and the 3rd in the Paraguay River basin. A 4th battalion is planned for Tabatinga, Amazonas, as well a Riverine Landing Troop Command, headquartered in the Amazon basin and commanded by a marine rear admiral. In operation, the Riverine Operations Battalion may compose joint Army-Navy riverine task forces. Its basic organization is that of an infantry battalion, with added police, combat engineering, special operations and watercraft components for a certain degree of independence from Rio de Janeiro. On the other hand, its strength (about 900 men in 2003) is slightly lower than that of a traditional battalion. Operations are decentralized and each squad has its own combat medic. 81 mm mortars, .50 machine guns and anti-tank weaponry are its nominal heavy armament. Some officers and sergeants attend the Army's jungle warfare course. The 3rd Battalion holds its own course for its terrain, the Pantanal.

In addition, there are three NCBR Protection and Defense Battalions: the 1st in Iperó, São Paulo, under the Navy Technological Center in São Paulo, the aforementioned 2nd in the Littoral Division and the 3rd in Brasília, under the 7th Naval District. Another such battalion has been planned for Itaguaí, the future nuclear submarine home port. The 1st battalion is responsible for security and emergency control at the Aramar Experimental Center, part of the Navy's nuclear program, while the 3rd battalion is the former Brasília Marine Group.

== Military exercises ==
Moments of Operation Formosa:

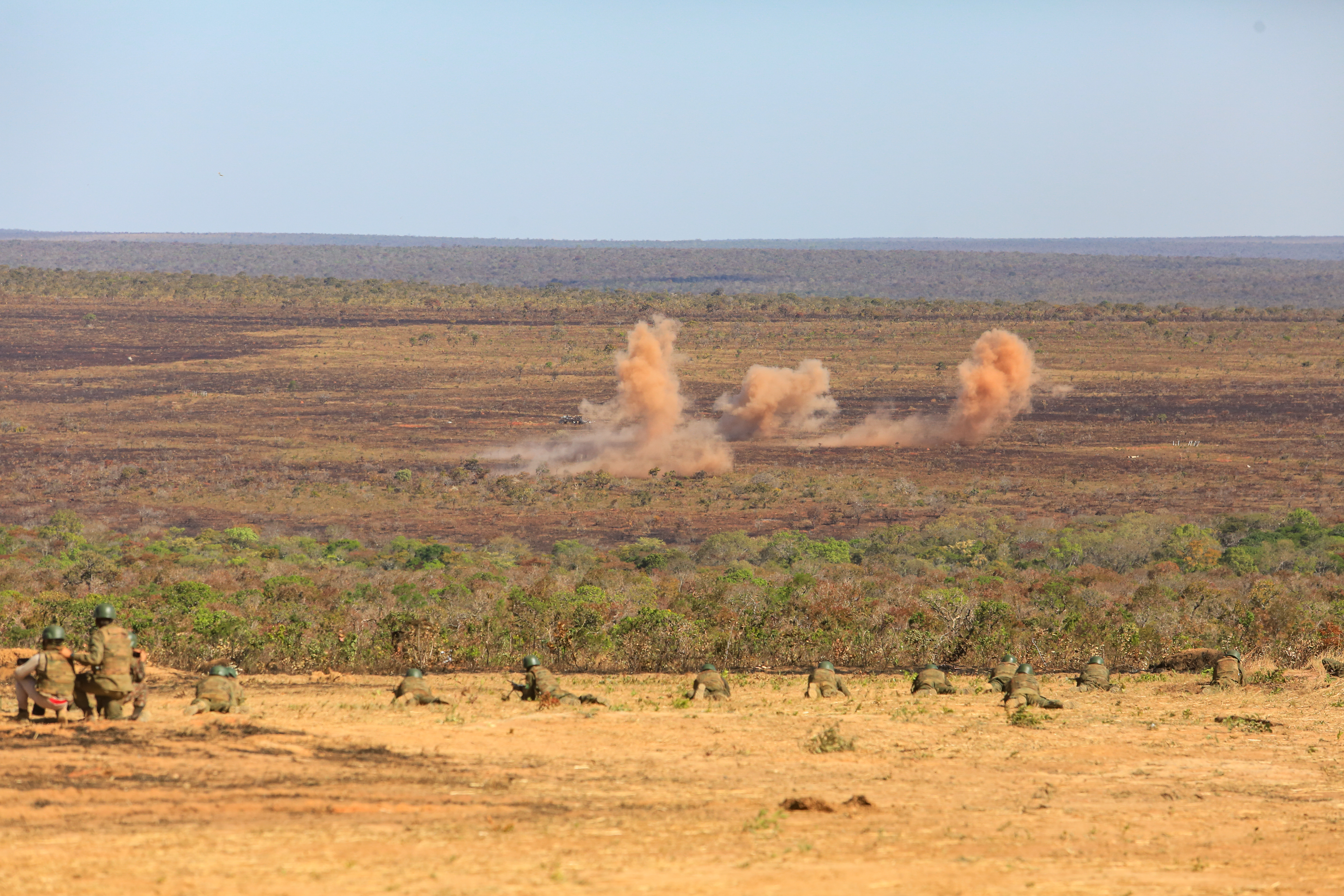
Impact of an artillery strike

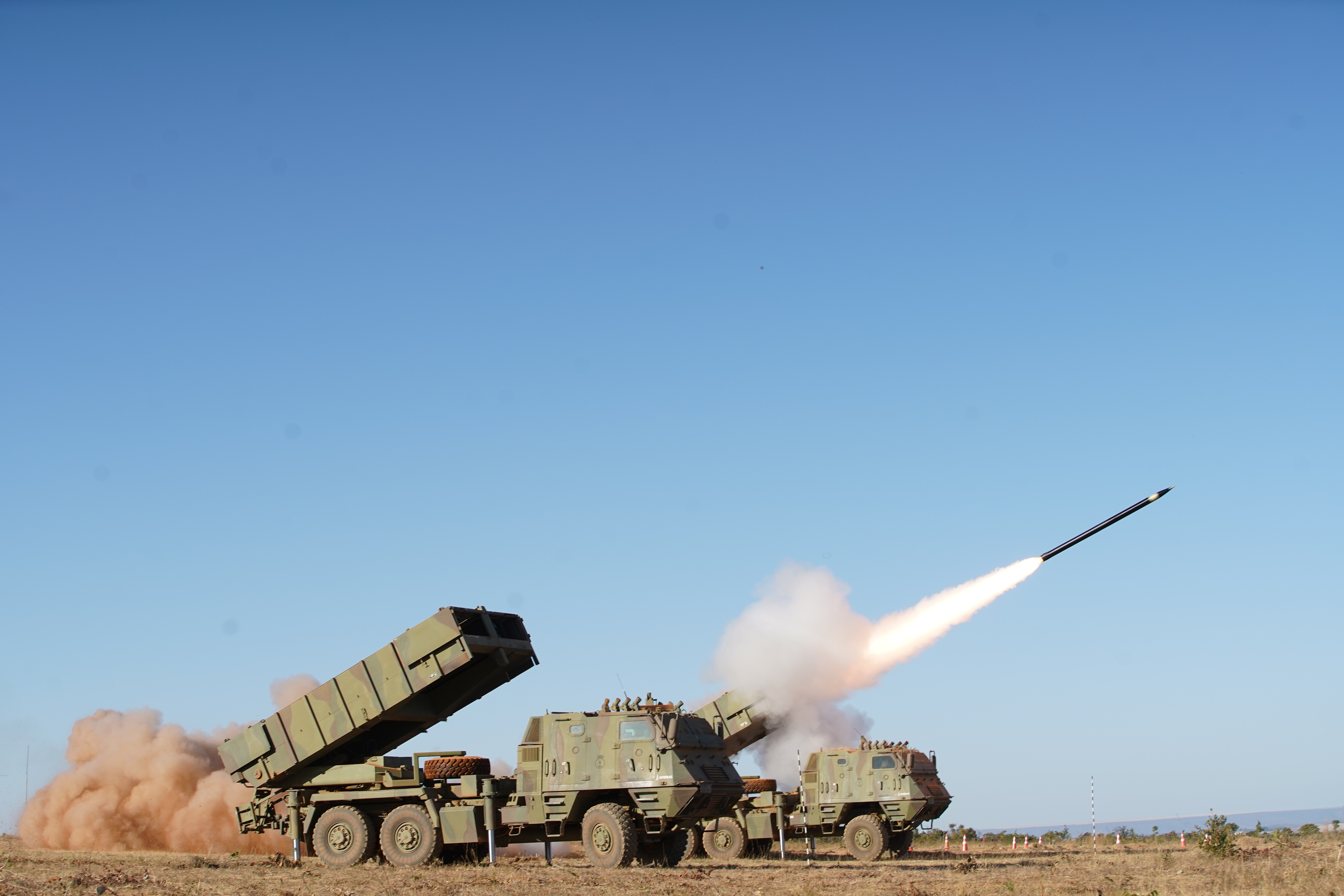
ASTROS 2020 firing

Amphibious training in the Brazilian Navy culminates in Operation Dragão, held annually since 1964, with a gap between 2001 and 2016. In this period, due to lack of funding and ships, it was replaced by the smaller-scale "UANFEX". Operation Dragão presumes a fictional conflict, centered on land, for which the FFE is moved across the sea and simulates an amphibious assault to conquer enemy territory. This combines the Navy's naval, air and marine elements, with further contributions from the Army and Air Force. Its beaches have included Ilhéus and Porto Seguro in Bahia, Ponta da Fruta, Marataízes, Meaípe, Itaoca and Guarapari, in Espírito Santo, Macaé, in Rio de Janeiro, São Sebastião, in São Paulo, as well as Imbituba and Itajaí, in Santa Catarina. At its peak in the early period, in 1995, 23 ships, 11 helicopters, six Air Force aircraft, eight AAVs and 2,388 personnel participated.

Fleet Corps assets in Operation Dragão form into the "Amphibious Task Force", to which a marine Landing Force is subordinated. In Operation Dragão XXXVIII, in 2018, ten ships were deployed. Marines boarded two capital ships in Rio de Janeiro, the Bahia and Almirante Saboia, and were escorted by two Niterói-class frigates. In preparation, minesweepers cleared the landing zone and combat divers and Amphibious Commandos, carried aboard patrol vessels, conducted reconnaissance and commando raids. At "D-Day", 750 infantrymen landed in Itaoca with 13 AAVs and several LCUs and LCMs, which brought four Piranha APCs and other vehicles. While these troops advanced, a logistical structure was built at the beachhead. Once objectives were taken, marines took defensive positions until the order to board again, when the simulation presumes other troops would take over the frontline. A unit of the FFE usually represents the enemy.

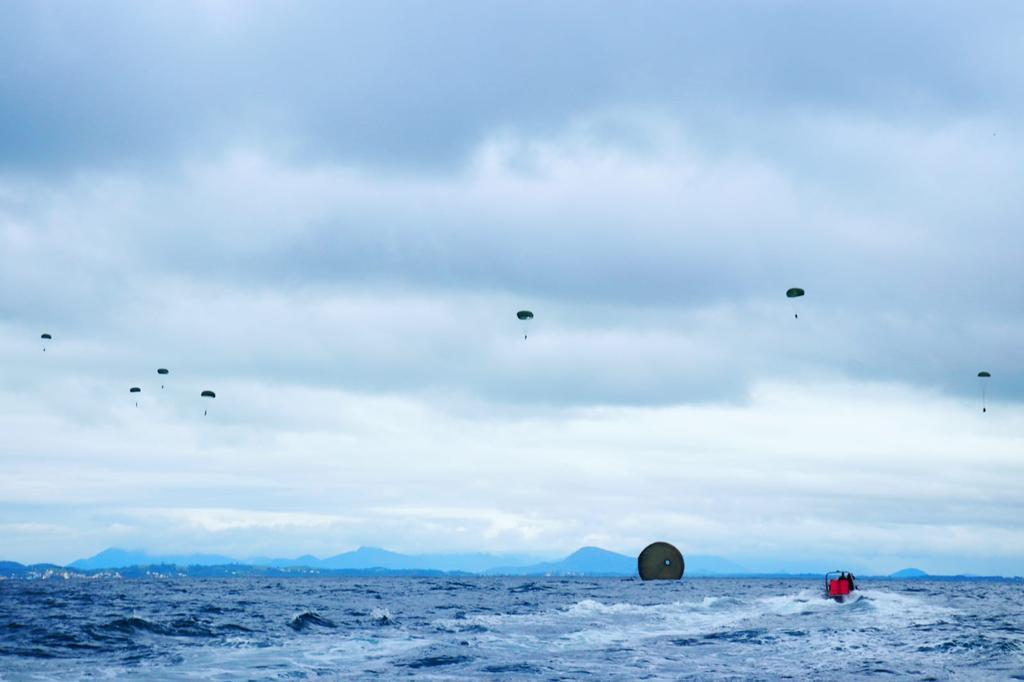
Paratroopers jump in Operation Dragão

When Operation Dragão could not be held, the annual exercise to top off training cycles was Operation Formosa, which still represents a landing, but excludes the Fleet. The emphasis is on live ammunition and fire coordination, covering land and air combat with infantry, paratroopers, armor, artillery and aviation. It is held annually since 1988 at the Formosa Instruction Camp, in Goiás, a 114,000-hectare area under Army administration and the only training field in the country with enough room to fire rockets from ASTROS launchers. The Army and Air Force also participate since 2021. The redeployment to Formosa from Rio de Janeiro, 1,300 kilometers away, is by itself a large-scale logistical operation. The 2024 edition included over three thousand personnel, American and Chinese troops and observers from eight other countries.

Riverine operations training by the FFE takes place at the Furnas Reservoir in Minas Gerais, one of the largest river reservoirs in the world, with the additional advantages of mountainous terrain in the surroundings and a deactivated airport which was converted into a Naval Aviation base. Operation Furnas I/2023 mobilized over 1,300 marines.

== See also ==
- List of equipment of the Brazilian Marine Corps

== References and notes ==
=== Bibliography ===
==== Books and publications ====
- Almeida, Anderson da Silva (2010). Todo o leme a bombordo – marinheiros e ditadura civil-militar no Brasil: da rebelião de 1964 à Anistia (PDF) (Dissertation). Universidade Federal Fluminense. Archived from the original (PDF) on 2016-12-04.
- Almeida, Anderson da Silva (2017). ...como se fosse um deles. Almirante Aragão: memórias, silêncios e ressentimentos em tempos de ditadura e democracia (PDF). Niterói: Eduff. ISBN 978-85-228-1267-7. Archived from the original (PDF) on 2021-05-15.
- Almeida, Nélio de; Oliveira, Edson (2017). "A atividade expedicionária no contexto das operações conjuntas". Âncoras e Fuzis (48). Mangaratiba: Comando do Desenvolvimento Doutrinário do Corpo de Fuzileiros Navais.
- Alsina Jr., João Paulo Soares (2010). "Reflexões sobre a forma de recrutamento das Forças Armadas Brasileiras e suas implicações para a defesa nacional". DADOS - Revista de Ciências Sociais. Vol. 53, no. 2. Rio de Janeiro: IESP - UERJ. pp. 469–500.
- Arruda, Francisco Andrade de (2015). Projeção anfíbia como modalidade de operações anfíbias: possibilidades e limitações (PDF) (Monograph). Escola de Guerra Naval.
- Barbosa, Thiago das Neves (2024). "As Operações Psicológicas no nível tático em apoio às ações da Força de Fuzileiros da Esquadra". Vitória nas Sombras: Revista do Comando Naval de Operações Especiais. 1 (1).
- Barreira, Marcio Rossini (2016). "Operações ribeirinhas na Amazônia Ocidental". In Domingos Savio Almeida Nogueira, Alceu Kreniski Júnior (orgs.) (ed.). A Marinha na Amazônia Ocidental (PDF). Brasília: Centro de Comunicação Social da Marinha.
- Bielinski, Alba Carneiro (2008). Os Fuzileiros Navais na história do Brasil. Rio de Janeiro: Agência 2A Comunicação.
- Boehmer Junior, Hermann Iberê Santos (2009). A segurança do Atlântico Sul: o papel do Brasil (PDF) (Trabalho de Investigação Individual). Instituto de Estudos Superiores Militares (Forças Armadas de Portugal).
- Cabrita, Leonardo Barbosa (July–September 2018). "Corpo de Fuzileiros Navais e seus Comandos Anfíbios". Revista Marítima Brasileira. Vol. 138, no. 7–9. Rio de Janeiro: Serviço de Documentação Geral da Marinha.
- Cantídio, Luiz Carlos da Silva (1993). "O combatente anfíbio — Parte 1". Revista Marítima Brasileira. Vol. 113, no. 7–9. Rio de Janeiro: Serviço de Documentação Geral da Marinha.
- Cardoso, Pedro (January–June 2021). "A atuação militar contra a greve no porto de Santos em 1980". Revista Cantareira. No. 34. Universidade Federal Fluminense.
- Castro, Celso Corrêa Pinto de (2004). O espírito militar: um antropólogo na caserna (2nd ed.). Rio de Janeiro: Zahar. ISBN 978-85-378-0452-0.
- Castro, Robert Wagner Porto da Silva (2022). Vapor, Suor e Sangue: marinheiros-trabalhadores e os levante navais no Século XX - mobilizações legalistas no contexto dos Golpes de Estado, Brasil (1964) Chile (1973) (PDF) (Thesis). Pontifícia Universidade Católica do Rio Grande do Sul. Archived from the original (PDF) on 2023-09-23.
- National Intelligence Survey, Brazil, Armed Forces (PDF) (Report). Central Intelligence Agency. September 1973. Archived from the original (PDF) on 2021-08-10.
- Côdo, Dirlei Donizette (2021). "Operações em Amplo Espectro para o Grupamento Operativo de Fuzileiros Navais". Âncoras e Fuzis. No. 52. Mangaratiba: Comando do Desenvolvimento Doutrinário do Corpo de Fuzileiros Navais.
- Coelho, Leonardo José Batalha (2021). A contribuição da Companhia de Abastecimento do Batalhão Logístico de Fuzileiros Navais junto ao crescente logístico nas operações anfíbias (PDF) (Monograph). Escola de Aperfeiçoamento de Oficiais (Exército Brasileiro).
- Corrêa, Fernanda das Graças (2016). Políticas & aquisições de defesa: uma análise histórica da parceria estratégica França-Brasil nos séculos XX e XXI (PDF) (Thesis). Departamento de Ciência Política da Universidade Federal Fluminense.
- Daróz, Carlos Roberto Carvalho (June 2017). "A artilharia brasileira e a defesa de Fernando de Noronha durante a 2ª Guerra Mundial". Tiempo y Espacio. Vol. 27, no. 67. Caracas. Archived from the original on 2022-10-19.
- Dreyfus, Pablo; Lessing, Benjamin; Nascimento, Marcelo de Sousa; Purcena, Júlio César (2010). Small Arms in Brazil: Production, Trade, and Holdings (PDF). Gêneva: Small Arms Survey. ISBN 978-2-940415-40-3.
- Anuario Latinoamericano de la Defensa. Madri: Grupo EDEFA. 2024.
- Esteves, Fernanda Márcia da Silveira; et al. (2022). "Seleção de um helicóptero de ataque para apoio às operações anfíbias da Marinha do Brasil: uma análise à luz do método Thor 2". Valore: Revista Científica da FASF Faculdade Sul Fluminense. 7.
- Farias, Anthony Robertson Nascimento de (2023). As novas gerações e a liderança militar: a geração Z diante dos preceitos basilares da liderança militar: aderências e conflitos (PDF) (Monograph). Escola Superior de Guerra.
- Ferreira, Gil Cordeiro Dias (1996). "Haverá uma cavalaria anfíbia?". A Defesa Nacional. No. 774. pp. 123–133.
- Ferreira, Daniel do Nascimento; Montenegro, Letícia Almeida; Nobre, Fábio (2020). "O poder marítimo do Brasil: uma análise da potencialidade do Nordeste brasileiro no fomento da projeção de poder sobre o Atlântico Sul". Revista de Estudos Internacionais. Vol. 11, no. 2. Universidade Estadual da Paraíba. ISSN 2236-4811.
- Franco, Daniel Martins (2014). "O Emprego de Fuzileiros Navais a bordo de navios em Patrulha Naval". Âncoras e Fuzis. No. 45. Mangaratiba: Comando do Desenvolvimento Doutrinário do Corpo de Fuzileiros Navais.
- França, Renato Heil (2013). "Operações Anfíbias: a vocação do passado se consolida como eixo estruturante do futuro". Âncoras e Fuzis. No. 44. Mangaratiba: Comando do Desenvolvimento Doutrinário do Corpo de Fuzileiros Navais.
- Gioseffi, José Carlos Silva (2014). "A evolução do planejamento estratégico do Corpo de Fuzileiros Navais" (PDF). O Anfíbio. Vol. 32. Rio de Janeiro: Associação Cultural e Histórica do Corpo de Fuzileiros Navais. ISSN 2358-4394.
- Granja, Mariana (2018). "Operação "Dragão 38": a força que vem do mar". Marinha em Revista. No. 12. Centro de Comunicação Social da Marinha.
- International Institute for Strategic Studies (2024). The Military Balance 2024. Routledge. ISBN 978-1-003-48583-4.
- Jenkins, Brent P. (1991). United States warship transfers to Argentina, Brazil, and Chile: options for U.S. policy (PDF) (Thesis). US Naval Postgraduate School.
- Jesus, Thiago Ribeiro de (2017). "Projeção Anfíbia: sua evolução no United States Marine Corps e no Corpo de Fuzileiros Navais do Brasil". Revista Marítima Brasileira. Vol. 137, no. 1–3. Rio de Janeiro: Serviço de Documentação da Marinha.
- Kuhlmann, Paulo Roberto Loyolla (2007). Exército brasileiro: estrutura militar e ordenamento político 1984-2007 (PDF) (Thesis). Departamento de Ciência Política da Faculdade de Filosofia, Letras e Ciências Humanas, Universidade de São Paulo.
- Hoelscher, Kristian; Norheim-Martinsen, Per M. (2014). "Urban violence and the militarisation of security: Brazilian "peacekeeping" in Rio de Janeiro and Port-au-Prince". Small Wars & Insurgencies. Vol. 25, no. 5–6. pp. 957–975. doi:10.1080/09592318.2014.945636.
- Lage, Rogério Ramos (2014). Elemento anfíbio em operações expedicionárias: possibilidades para a Marinha do Brasil (PDF) (Dissertation). Escola de Guerra Naval.
- Leite, Humberto (2020a). "Olhos, ouvidos e garras da esquadra" (PDF). Revista Asas. No. Edição especial (105): Força Aeronaval da Marinha do Brasil.
- Leite, Humberto (2020b). "Pistas de pouso que flutuam" (PDF). Revista Asas. No. Edição especial (105): Força Aeronaval da Marinha do Brasil.
- Livro Branco de Defesa Nacional (PDF). Brasília: Ministério da Defesa. 2012.
- Lopes, Roberto (2014). As garras do cisne: o ambicioso plano da Marinha brasileira de se transformar na nona frota mais poderosa do mundo (Livro II). Rio de Janeiro: Record. ISBN 978-85-01-10276-8.
- Maia, Carlos Eduardo Gonçalves da Silva; Pereira, Raphael do Couto (2017). "As Operações Humanitárias no contexto das Operações de Paz: a contribuição da MB". Revista Marítima Brasileira. Vol. 137, no. 10–12. Rio de Janeiro: Serviço de Documentação Geral da Marinha.
- Marques, Adriana Aparecida (2001). Concepções de defesa nacional no Brasil: 1950-1996 (Dissertation). Universidade Estadual de Campinas.
- Medeiros, Reinaldo Reis de (2021). "A expansão no GptOpFuzNav". Âncoras e Fuzis (52). Mangaratiba: Comando do Desenvolvimento Doutrinário do Corpo de Fuzileiros Navais.
- Moloeznik, Marcos Pablo (April–June 2018). "Infantería de Marina en América Latina: pasado, presente y proyección a futuro" (PDF). Revista del Centro de Estudios Superiores Navales. Vol. 39, no. 2. pp. 11–46.
- Moralez, João Paulo; Braga, Carlos Chagas Vianna (2025). "O Corpo de Fuzileiros Navais da Marinha do Brasil". Tecnologia & Defesa. No. 178.
- Muller, Mariana Lemos (2022). Espírito de Corpus – criação de um léxico bilíngue do Corpo de Fuzileiros Navais (PDF) (Dissertation). Programa de Pós-Graduação em Estudos da Linguagem da PUC-Rio.
- Nascimento, Celio Litwak (July–September 2019). "2º BtlOpRib: "guardião do portal da Amazônia"". Revista Marítima Brasileira. Vol. 139, no. 7/9. Rio de Janeiro: Serviço de Documentação Geral da Marinha.
- Olive, Ronaldo (2014-01-27). "Brazil's Corpo de Fuzileiros Navais". Small Arms Defense Journal. 6 (1). Archived from the original on 2022-07-03.
- Oliveira, Edson de (2016). "Amazônia Azul: a contribuição dos Distritos Navais". Âncoras e Fuzis. No. 47. Mangaratiba: Comando do Desenvolvimento Doutrinário do Corpo de Fuzileiros Navais.
- Oliveira Filho, Sergio Willian de Castro (2022). "Patronos da Marinha do Brasil". In Francisco Carlos Teixeira da Silva et al. (org.) (ed.). Dicionário de história militar do Brasil (1822-2022): volume II. Rio de Janeiro: Autografia. ISBN 978-85-518-4910-1.
- Parucker, Paulo Eduardo Castello (2006). Praças em pé de guerra: o movimento político dos subalternos militares no Brasil, 1961-1964 (Dissertation). Niterói: Universidade Federal Fluminense. Archived from the original on 2021-08-31.
- Pereira, Luis Gustavo Silva (2022). A Marinha e as Projeções Anfíbias: capacidades atuais da Força para realizar Projeções Anfíbias de caráter benigno (PDF) (Dissertation). Escola de Guerra Naval.
- Pesce, Eduardo Ítalo; Carneiro, Mário Roberto Vaz (January–March 2001). "A necessidade de uma marinha oceânica". Revista Marítima Brasileira. 121 (1–3). Rio de Janeiro: Serviço de Documentação Geral da Marinha.
- Pinheiro, Alvaro de Sousa (2012). "Knowing your partner: the evolution of Brazilian special operations forces" (PDF). JSOU Report. No. 12–7.
- Piñon, Charles Pacheco (2022a). "Navios anfíbios". In Francisco Carlos Teixeira da Silva et al. (org.) (ed.). Dicionário de história militar do Brasil (1822-2022): volume II. Rio de Janeiro: Autografia. ISBN 978-85-518-4910-1.
- Piñon, Charles Pacheco (2022b). "Operações anfíbias". In Francisco Carlos Teixeira da Silva et al. (org.) (ed.). Dicionário de história militar do Brasil (1822-2022): volume II. Rio de Janeiro: Autografia. ISBN 978-85-518-4910-1.
- "Edição comemorativa de aniversário da Força de Fuzileiros da Esquadra". Revista da FFE. Força de Fuzileiros da Esquadra. April 2017.
- Rodrigues, José Emílio de Oliveira (2013). "É preciso "fazer" Guerra de Manobra". Âncoras e Fuzis. No. 44. Mangaratiba: Comando do Desenvolvimento Doutrinário do Corpo de Fuzileiros Navais.
- Rodrigues, Rosane Pinto (2014). Sentinelas dos mares: a carreira militar e suas representações sociais para aspirantes e oficiais da Marinha do Brasil (PDF) (Dissertation). Universidade Federal Rural do Rio de Janeiro.
- Rodrigues, Luiz Felipe de Almeida (2015). "Mensagem do Editor". A tropa em revista. No. 3.
- Salles, Felipe; Galante, Alexandre (2023). "The Brazilian Navy entering its third century". In Conrad Waters (ed.). Seaforth World Naval Review 2024. Pen & Sword. ISBN 978-1-3990-2312-2.
- Schmidt, Luna Daniela Damo (2014). Polícia Militar no Brasil: possibilidade de desmilitarização da estrutura policial ostensiva (PDF) (Monograph). Universidade Federal do Rio Grande do Sul.
- Silva, Peterson Ferreira da (2015). A política industrial de defesa no Brasil (1999-2014): intersetorialidade e dinâmica de seus principais atores (PDF) (Thesis). Instituto de Relações Internacionais da Universidade de São Paulo.
- Silva, Augusto Marques Sampaio da (2016). O Componente de Combate Aéreo em uma Operação Anfíbia (PDF) (Monograph). Escola de Artilharia de Costa e Antiaérea (Exército Brasileiro).
- Silva, Luís Felippe Valentini da (2021). "Operational Maneuver From The Sea (OMFTS) e o Ship-to-Objective Maneuver (STOM): conceitos e aplicações para os GptOpFuzNav". Âncoras e Fuzis. No. 52. Mangaratiba: Comando do Desenvolvimento Doutrinário do Corpo de Fuzileiros Navais.
- Silveira, Cláudio de Carvalho (2002). A formação dos oficiais da Marinha do Brasil: educação, profissão, pensamento estratégico (1978-2001) (Thesis). Departamento de Ciência Política da Universidade Estadual de Campinas. Archived from the original on 2024-10-08.
- Soares, Renata Cristina Ferreira (2015). O uso das forças armadas em atividades subsidiárias: o caso da Marinha do Brasil (Master's Thesis). Escola Brasileira de Administração Pública e de Empresas.
- Teixeira, Bruno Rafael da Silva; Medeiros, Jason Azevedo de (2017). "Potência aeróbia máxima e somatotipo do Corpo de Fuzileiros Navais de Natal-RN". Revista UNI-RN. 16 (17 (suplemento)). Natal.
- Teixeira, Esley Rodrigues de Jesus (2023). "Os Fuzileiros Navais no Segundo Reinado". Revista do Clube Naval. Vol. 3, no. 407.
- Vallim, Jose Domingos Araujo (2017). "Operações Expedicionárias: a garantia dos interesses nacionais além-mar". Âncoras e Fuzis. No. 48. Mangaratiba: Comando do Desenvolvimento Doutrinário do Corpo de Fuzileiros Navais.
- Vellame, Jorge Nerie (2006). "Formação dos oficiais para os primeiros postos da carreira". O Anfíbio. Vol. 35. Rio de Janeiro: Associação Cultural e Histórica do Corpo de Fuzileiros Navais. ISSN 2358-4394.
- Vellame, Jorge Nerie (2014). Operação anfíbia: é válido a Marinha do Brasil manter a capacidade de realizá-la no século XXI? (PDF) (Monograph). Escola Superior de Guerra.

==== Websites ====
- "GRFLAD - Grupamento de Fuzileiros Navais de Ladário". Acervo Arquivístico da Marinha do Brasil. 2013-11-22.
- "Embarcação de Desembarque de Carga Geral Guarapari". Acervo Arquivístico da Marinha do Brasil. 2023-03-08.
- Andrade, Hanrrikson de (2011-11-13). "Favelas da Rocinha e Vidigal estão totalmente ocupadas, diz PM". UOL.
- Araújo, Fernando; Oliveira, Taise; Stilben, João (2024-03-07). ""Na vanguarda que é honra e dever!": conheça a tropa de elite da Marinha do Brasil". Agência Marinha de Notícias. Archived from the original on 2024-03-19.
- Arcoverde, Luciano; Barreto, Hugo (2024-09-12). "Operação militar reúne tropas do Brasil, dos EUA e da China no Entorno". Metrópoles.
- Augusto, Robson (2023-07-29). "Surpreenda-se com o salário do militar que opera o blindado AAV7A1, avaliado em 3 milhões de dólares". Revista Sociedade Militar.
- Bastos Jr., Paulo Roberto (2024-07-19). "Chegaram os últimos quatro JLTV dos Fuzileiros". Revista Tecnologia & Defesa.
- Cabral, Maria Clara; Bragon, Ranier; Magalhães, João Carlos; Leitão, Matheus (2011-03-27). "Marinha ordenou a morte de militantes no Araguaia em 1972". Folha de S. Paulo.
- Caiafa, Roberto (2023-12-30). "Lento, mas constante: o 'passo a passo' da Defesa Brasileira em 2023". InfoDefensa.
- Carneiro, Mário Roberto Vaz (2010). "Fuzileiros blindados". Revista Segurança & Defesa via Operacional.pt.
- Centro de Comunicação Social da Marinha (2021-12-11). "Operação DRAGÃO 2021, o mais importante exercício de desembarque da Marinha". Revista Tecnologia & Defesa.
- Centro de Comunicação Social da Marinha (2023-12-06). "Mostra de desarmamento do NDCC "Mattoso Maia" marca início do processo de desativação de meios da Marinha". Defesa Aérea & Naval.
- Comando da Força Aeronaval (2023-01-06). "Esquadrão HU-2 alcança um marco histórico de disponibilidade dos meios". Poder Naval.
- "Ações Cívico-Sociais". Comando da Força de Fuzileiros da Esquadra.
- "A Força de Fuzileiros da Esquadra realiza a maior operação militar de Minas Gerais - Operação Furnas I/2023". Comando da Força de Fuzileiros da Esquadra.
- "GptFNNa realiza o segundo Estágio de Qualificação Técnica Especial em Operações na Caatinga". Comando do 3º Distrito Naval.
- "Histórico". Comando do 8º Distrito Naval.
- "Corpo de Fuzileiros Navais comemora 210 anos". Comando-Geral do Corpo de Fuzileiros Navais.
- "O Batalhão Naval". Comando-Geral do Corpo de Fuzileiros Navais.
- "Comandante-Geral". Comando-Geral do Corpo de Fuzileiros Navais.
- "Histórico". Comando-Geral do Corpo de Fuzileiros Navais.
- "O Museu do CFN". Comando-Geral do Corpo de Fuzileiros Navais.
- Corrêa, Hudson (2016-07-22). "Forças Armadas terão 5 mil militares da "tropa de elite" nos Jogos Olímpicos". Época.
- "Linha do tempo". Corpo de Fuzileiros Navais. Archived from the original on 2024-03-16.
- Costa, Fabrício Sérgio (2022-04-28). "Após certificação da ONU, tropa de Fuzileiros Navais demonstra suas capacidades". Agência Marinha de Notícias via Revista Tecnologia & Defesa.
- Costa, Thais; Cirino, Melissa (2023-11-02). "Comando do 7º Distrito Naval: a Marinha no coração do Brasil". Agência Marinha de Notícias.
- Dias, Daniella (2024-02-19). "Marinha começa 1ª turma com mulheres do curso de fuzileiros navais". G1 Rio de Janeiro.
- "Fuzileiros Navais - Da Praia de Caiena às Ruas do Haiti". Diretoria do Patrimônio Histórico e Documentação da Marinha. Archived from the original on 2021-04-22.
- "As cores da tradição". Escola de Aprendizes-Marinheiros de Santa Catarina.
- Estadão Conteúdo (2018-03-04). "No Rio, ex-militares ensinam táticas do Exército a facções criminosas". Metrópoles.
- "Concurso Fuzileiro Naval 2024/2025: vagas, datas e etapas!". Estratégia Militares. 2024-06-05.
- Fontoura, Alexandre. "Marinha amplia presença na Amazônia". Revista Segurança & Defesa. Archived from the original on 2003-09-15.
- "Histórico". Força de Fuzileiros da Esquadra.
- "Comando da Divisão Anfíbia". Força de Fuzileiros da Esquadra.
- "Comando da Tropa de Reforço". Força de Fuzileiros da Esquadra.
- Galante, Alexandre (2011-01-28). "Os investimentos necessários à implementação do PAEMB". Poder Naval.
- Galante, Alexandre (2018-06-28). "Ridex: visita ao NDM Bahia". Poder Naval.
- Gielow, Igor (2021-03-31). "Entenda como funcionam as promoções nas Forças Armadas do Brasil". Folha de S. Paulo.
- "GptFNB realiza exercício QUARTELEX II/2022". Grupamento de Fuzileiros Navais de Brasília.
- "Corpo de Fuzileiros Navais recebe Astros CFN 2020". InfoDefensa. 2014-04-03.
- Isquierdo, Melina; Affe, Juliana (2023-09-01). "Comando do 6º Distrito Naval: há 150 anos protegendo os rios da fronteira oeste do Brasil". Agência Marinha de Notícias.
- Jefferson S (2023-07-10). "Metade dos militares do Exército Brasileiro recebem menos de 2 salários mínimos por mês". Revista Sociedade Militar.
- Lopes, Roberto (2015-11-26). "DOSSIÊ Impacto do Ajuste Fiscal no CFN: Fuzileiros levarão 15 anos (ou mais) para ativar batalhões nas fronteiras com o Paraguai e a Colômbia". Plano Brasil. Archived from the original on 2016-10-13.
- Malin, Mauro (2016-07-26). "Estratégia de defesa é ignorada". Observatório da Imprensa via Poder Naval.
- "História". Marinha - Fuzileiros.
- "Orientações sobre a carreira do Corpo de Praças Fuzileiros Navais" (PDF). Marinha do Brasil. Archived from the original (PDF) on 2017-08-05.
- "Embarcação de Desembarque de Carga Geral". Marinha do Brasil.
- "Símbolos e costumes dos fuzileiros navais". Marinha do Brasil.
- "Patrono". Marinha do Brasil.
- "Comando-Geral do Corpo de Fuzileiros Navais". Marinha do Brasil.
- Marinha do Brasil (2014-01-20). "Corpo de Fuzileiros Navais recebe três novas VtrBldEspSR Piranha IIIC". Defesa Aérea & Naval.
- "Marinha realiza Mostra de Armamento da EDCG "Marambaia"". Marinha do Brasil. 2016-11-22.
- Marinha do Brasil (2018-09-25). "Corpo de Fuzileiros Navais recebe último CLAnf de nova geração". Forças Terrestres.
- "Grupamento de Fuzileiros Navais de Salvador realiza exercício "QUARTELEX" com novos soldados". Marinha do Brasil. 2020-10-15. Archived from the original on 2023-11-09.
- "GptFNRJ participa da Segurança Presidencial". Marinha do Brasil. 2022-06-08.
- "Estrutura Organizacional". Marinha do Brasil. Archived from the original on 2025-04-14.
- Martini, Fernando "Nunão" de (2018-09-28). "Você já foi ao Bahia? – parte 1". Poder Naval.
- Mendonça, Vanessa; Oliveira, Taise (2024-01-10). "Marinha reativa Grupamento de Fuzileiros Navais de Santos". Agência Marinha de Notícias.
- "Brasilia's pride: why Brazil can't make effective use of its second hand European carrier warships HMS Ocean and Clemenceau". Military Watch. 2018-04-07.
- "Banda do Corpo de Fuzileiros Navais mantém tradição com gaitas de fole escocesas". Ministério da Defesa. 2016-06-07. Archived from the original on 2016-06-08.
- "Navios de Guerra Brasileiros (NGB)". Poder Naval.
- Nomar (2012-11-02). "AMRJ lança Embarcação de Desembarque de Viaturas e Materiais (EDVM)". Defesa Aérea & Naval.
- Ommati, Marcos (2017-03-07). "Fuzileiros da Esquadra, uma força 100 por cento profissional". Diálogo Américas via Defesa Aérea & Naval.
- Ommati, Marcos (2017-03-20). "Divisão Anfíbia de Fuzileiros Navais, a Infantaria da Marinha do Brasil". Diálogo das Américas.
- Orbaiceta, Gonzalo Vázquez (2023-04-14). "Aspiraciones atlánticas y progreso naval de la Marinha do Brasil". Center for Global Affairs (Universidad de Navarra).
- "Comissão Nacional da Verdade visita ex-centro de tortura no Rio". O Tempo. 2014-10-21.
- Padilha, Luiz (2015-05-19). "Entrevista com o AE Leal Ferreira – "Forças Distritais"". Defesa Aérea & Naval.
- "Tropa da Marinha tem certificação máxima para missões da ONU". Poder 360. 2022-04-30.
- "Dimensionamento da Força Naval brasileira segundo a nova Estratégia de Defesa Marítima". Poder Naval. 2024-05-03.
- "Marinha do Brasil reestrutura denominação de unidades dos Fuzileiros Navais". Poder Naval. 2025-01-17.
- Poggio, Guilherme (2018-09-28). "PHM Atlântico: conheça as lanchas de desembarque LCVP Mk 5". Poder Naval.
- J. B. Reis (2024-03-08). "Marinha naufraga na internet! Surpreende muito a repercussão de post sobre aniversário do Corpo de Fuzileiros". Revista Sociedade Militar.
- "Tropa de elite da Marinha: conheça um pouco dos Fuzileiros Navais". R7 Notícias. 2013-03-07.
- Rodrigues, Thiago (2023-03-10). "O novo blindado da Marinha. O destino das Forças Armadas é ser polícia?". Le Monde diplomatique.
- Rogoway, Tyler (2017-04-17). "The Royal Navy's only operational aircraft carrier could be sold to Brazil". The War Zone.
- Salim, Julia (2023-10-04). "Marinha do Brasil realiza operação militar na região de Furnas, em MG". Estado de Minas.
- Santana, Vitor (2021-08-10). "Entenda o treinamento da Marinha em Formosa". G1 Goiás.
- "Estados Unidos e China realizam treinamento militar com o Brasil". Terra. 2024-09-07.
- Wiltgen, Guilherme (2016-12-09). "Operação Dragão XXXVII: Marinha do Brasil exercita sua capacidade anfíbia". Defesa Aérea & Naval.
