= Keef Trouble =

English musician (born 1949)

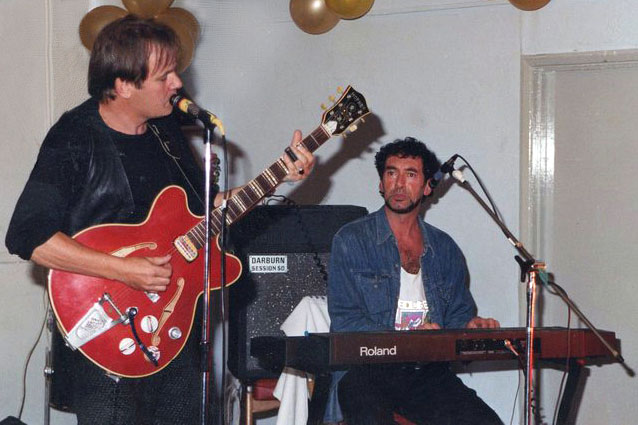
- Trouble accompanied by Jona Lewie, 1996

Background information
- Also known as: Dougie Damone
- Born: Keith Trussell; 13 September 1949 (age 76)
- Origin: Greenwich, London, England
- Genres: Rock, pop, blues
- Occupations: Singer, songwriter
- Instruments: Vocals, zob stick, guitar
- Years active: 1968–present
- Label: Sun House (UK)
- Formerly of: Brett Marvin and the Thunderbolts; Terry Dactyl and the Dinosaurs

Keef Trouble (born Keith Trussell, 1949, Greenwich, London) is an English singer, songwriter and musician.

== Career ==
Trouble studied at the Slade School of Fine Art, London, from 1968 to 1972. He is a founding member of British country-blues band Brett Marvin and the Thunderbolts as vocalist, guitarist, and player of the zobstick (also known as the lagerphone or monkey stick), and electric ironing board. Commercial success came in 1972 under the guise of Terry Dactyl and the Dinosaurs with "Seaside Shuffle" with fellow band members Graham Hine, John Randall, and Jona Lewie (of "Stop the Cavalry" notability). This record became a hit in Europe and Australia, and reached No. 2 in the UK Singles Chart. Trouble is also part of, and writes original material for, the folk rock band Okee Dokee, which plays within West Sussex and Kent, including the Broadstairs Folk Week. He has self-produced two solo albums, Oasis and Kix 4 U, under his own Sun House Records, and has collaborated with Tony O'Malley, previously from the bands 10cc, Kokomo and Arrival, writing the lyrics for O'Malley's "Mr. Operator" and "Naked Flame". O'Malley has also contributed to Trouble's recordings, as have artists such as saxophonist Mel Collins (Roxy Music, Rolling Stones, The Grease Band), guitarist Neil Hubbard, and vocalists Dyan Birch, Paddy McHugh and Frank Collins. In 2008 Trouble produced the Brett Marvin and the Thunderbolts' album Keep on Moving; co-producer and audio engineer was Pete Ker, who produced The Motors, Man, and Arthur Brown, co-writing Brown's "Fire".

Trouble co-wrote the lyrics to Lewie's 1980 hit "You'll Always Find Me in the Kitchen at Parties".

== The recording of Oasis and Mix ‘n’ Mingle ==
'Oasis'
Keef Trouble / Malvern Hostick

'Mix'n'Mingle'
Keef Trouble / Tony O'Malley

Trouble's association with Jona Lewie goes back to 1969, and later both were members of Terry Dactyl and the Dinosaurs. In 1986 the first recordings of Trouble's Oasis and Mix 'n’ Mingle for the album Oasis took place at Lewie's home studio in Streatham, with keyboard musician, arranger and composer Tony O'Malley, guitarist Neil Hubbard and engineer Pete Ker, producer for Arthur Brown and co-writer of Brown's "Fire". Trouble had secured a 45rpm single record deal with Rodd Buckle (Habana Music) for the release and distribution of Mix 'n’ Mingle. Because of master tape release difficulties and lateness of the production at the Lewie studio, the record deal fell. Oasis was re-recorded by Ker at a professional recording studio, Ferry Sound.

== The zob stick ==
Although it is an accepted and commonly used name for this type of instrument, the 'zob stick' as a term has a definitive and recent origin. In the late 1960s, Trouble built a percussion instrument that he used in his blues band Brett Marvin and the Thunderbolts. He invented a name for it, zob stick, with its use being termed 'zobbing'. It was largely based on the traditional folk music instruments monkey stick, ugly stick and lagerphone (Australian). After constructing his version of the instrument, the term 'zob' was used because of its risqué connotation as British naval slang, this suggested by fellow Brett Marvin band member, and ex-seaman, Jim Pitts. The instrument caused amusement when it was introduced in performance in France, where 'zob' has a similar meaning.

The Trouble zob stick construction uses a pole that is covered with typical partially nailed-in rattle-capable beer bottle caps. A circular solid wooden ring, edged with bottle caps, is added near the top of the pole, with a hand grip section beneath. All the wooden parts are brightly painted. At the bottom a boot, supported by an internal wooden block, is added, with a metal spring attached to the sole. The spring serves no musical purpose but has comedy potential. Halfway up the pole is a sleeved-on metal tube for greater volume and a crisper percussive sound. The Zob Stick is rhythmically bounced on the floor and the metal sleeve hit with a wooden stick. The stick itself, (usually an adapted hockey stick because of its durability,) is serrated to achieve a scraping sound effect when necessary. Although the resultant construction is heavy, requiring strength for continual use, this weight gives it a volume and 'clout' that the traditional monkey stick might not match, especially in a live and loud band situation.

== As Dougie Damone ==
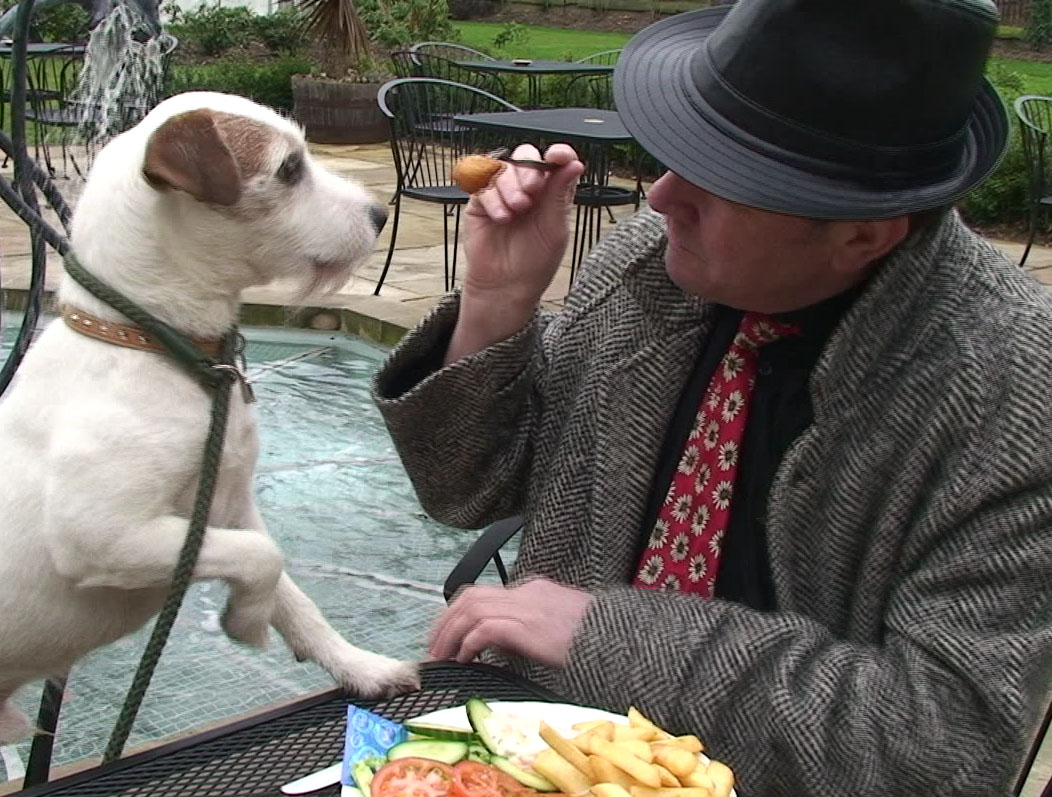
Dougie Damone in 2009 (aka Keef Trouble)

'Hello Mum'
words: Keef Trouble
music: Malvern Hostick

A composition, "Hello Mum", had been recorded at Ferry Sound in the early 1990s. The recording was released in the UK and sold as a 7-inch vinyl single and greeting's card for Mother's Day in 1992 under the CoverHit label, with the pseudonym 'Dougie Damone'. In 2008, the song was reproduced as a YouTube video which, with the song, was reviewed in the Mid Sussex Times.
