= Monkey stick =

English percussion instrument

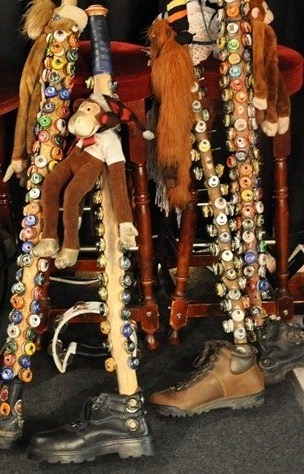

Percussion instrument
- Other names: Mendoza, mendozer, Murrumbidgee river rattler, lagerphone, zob stick
- Classification: Percussion
- Hornbostel–Sachs classification: 112.12 (Frame rattles)

A monkey stick (also called a mendoza, mendozer, Murrumbidgee river rattler, lagerphone or zob stick) is a traditional English percussion instrument, used in folk music. Some musicians have taken to fixing a small stuffed toy monkey to the tops of their instruments.

The instrument is constructed from a stout pole with metal "jingles" fastened at intervals along the shaft. These are commonly beer-bottle tops with a 1-inch washer in between the tops and the shaft. A boot that might be attached to the base of the pole is a recent 'Zob Stick' addition.

When played on a wooden floor (common in ale-houses), the sound produced is a combination of a bass drum and tambourine. It can also be played with an additional small notched or serrated stick held in the other hand, allowing it to not only be shaken or hammered onto the ground, but also "bowed" to produce a combined clicking and rattling sound. Bands such as Groanbox, Zapoppin' and Dr. Busker have incorporated the monkey stick into their recordings and live shows.

== Other names and versions ==
In Australia, this instrument constructed with beer-bottle tops is known as a lagerphone. The same name and construction is found in New Zealand. The town of Brooweena in Queensland, Australia claims to hold the unofficial record when 134 people simultaneously played the lagerphone in 2009.

In Newfoundland, it is referred to as an "ugly stick". In the Dutch province of Friesland this type of instrument is known as a 'kuttepiel'. In the American upper-Midwestern states of Minnesota and Wisconsin, the closely related vozembouch, stumpf fiddle or pogocello originated in Czech communities and adds small cymbals, strings, and a drum. A similar instrument, the batih, is found in Ukraine.

The "zob stick" variation of this instrument was constructed and named in 1968 by percussionist and songwriter Keef Trouble of the band Brett Marvin and the Thunderbolts and Terry Dactyl and the Dinosaurs, and included a sprung-boot attached to the bottom of the pole and a metal sleeve round its centre, to be hit with a serrated wooden stick. It is now, with the term ‘Lagerphone’, the most commonly used name for this instrument. The term 'zob' was taken from the British naval slang term for "penis".

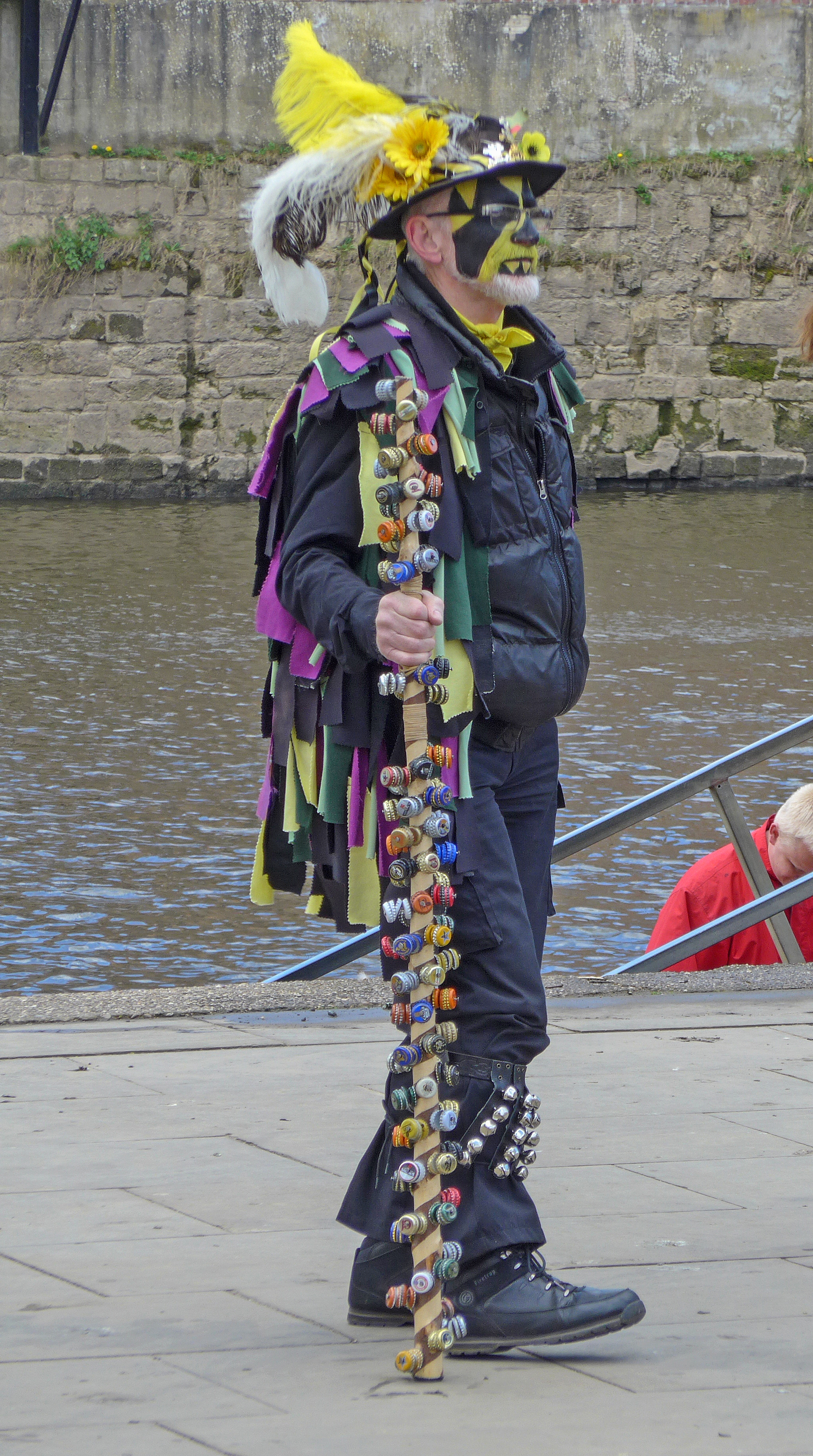
Instrument labeled Jingling Johnny in England. Lined with jingles made from beer caps.

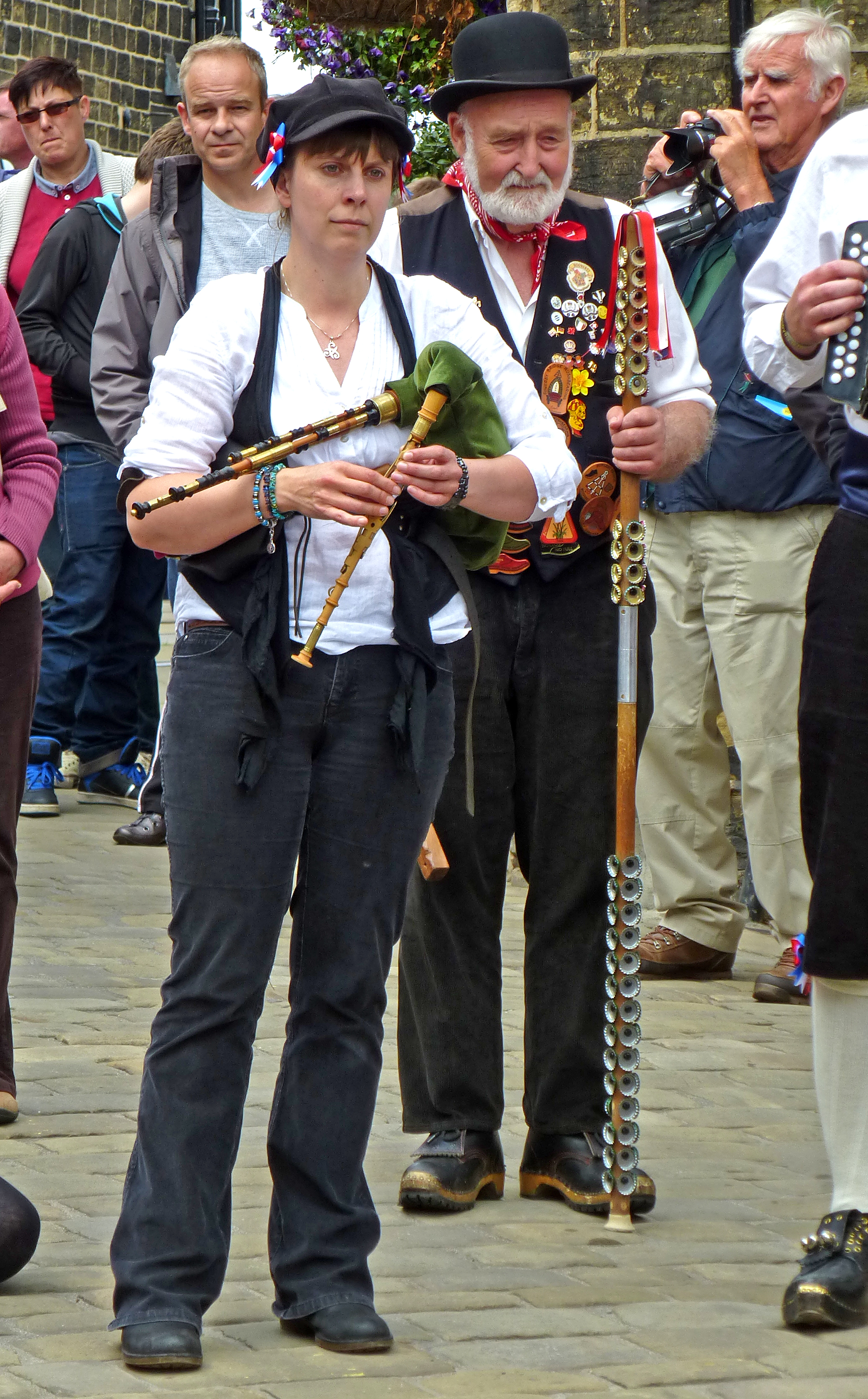
Instrument labeled Jingling Johnny (jingles made from beer caps), and Northumbrian bagpipes at Haworth, England

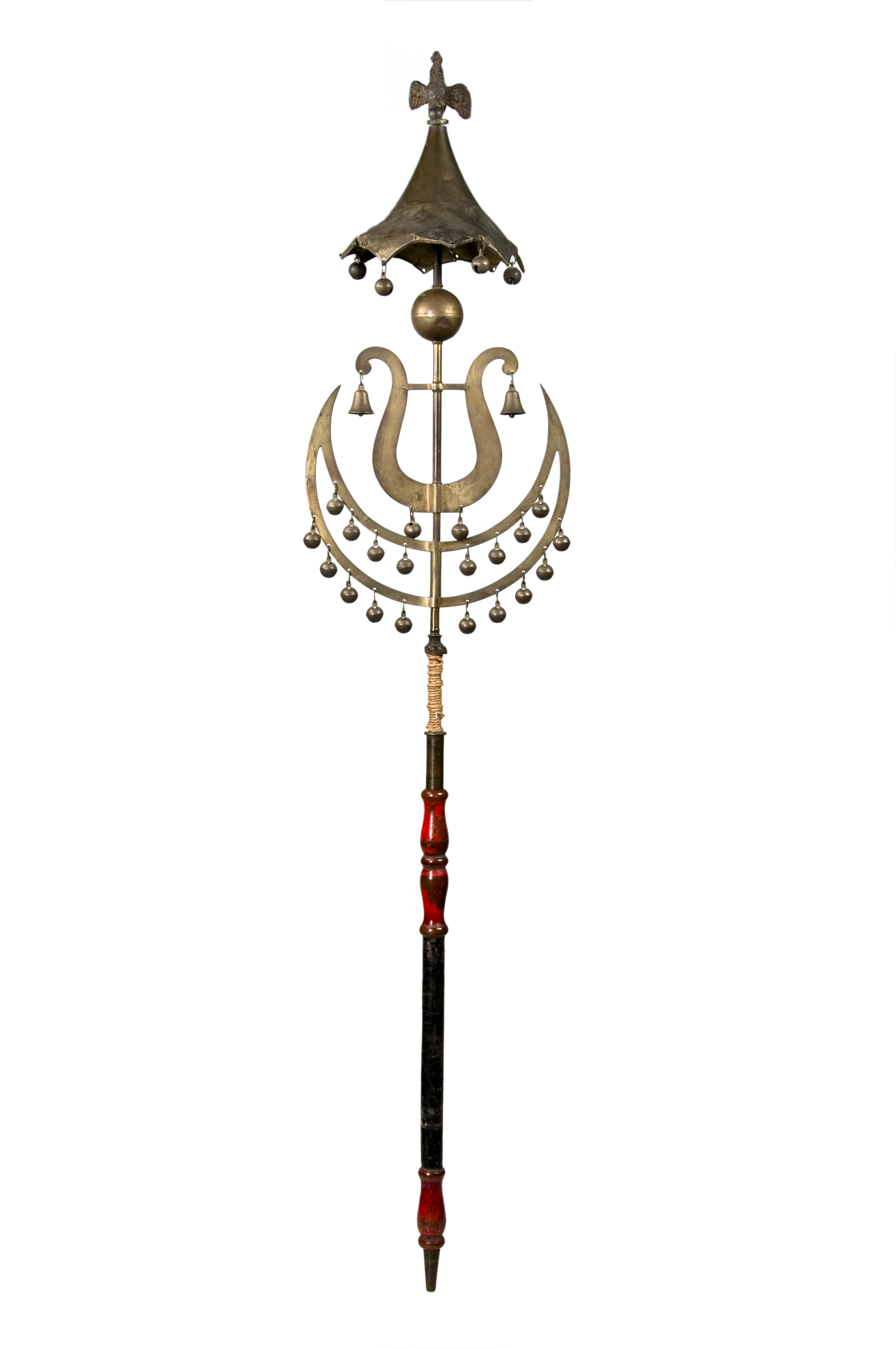
111.242.222. Turkish crescent or Jingling Johnny.

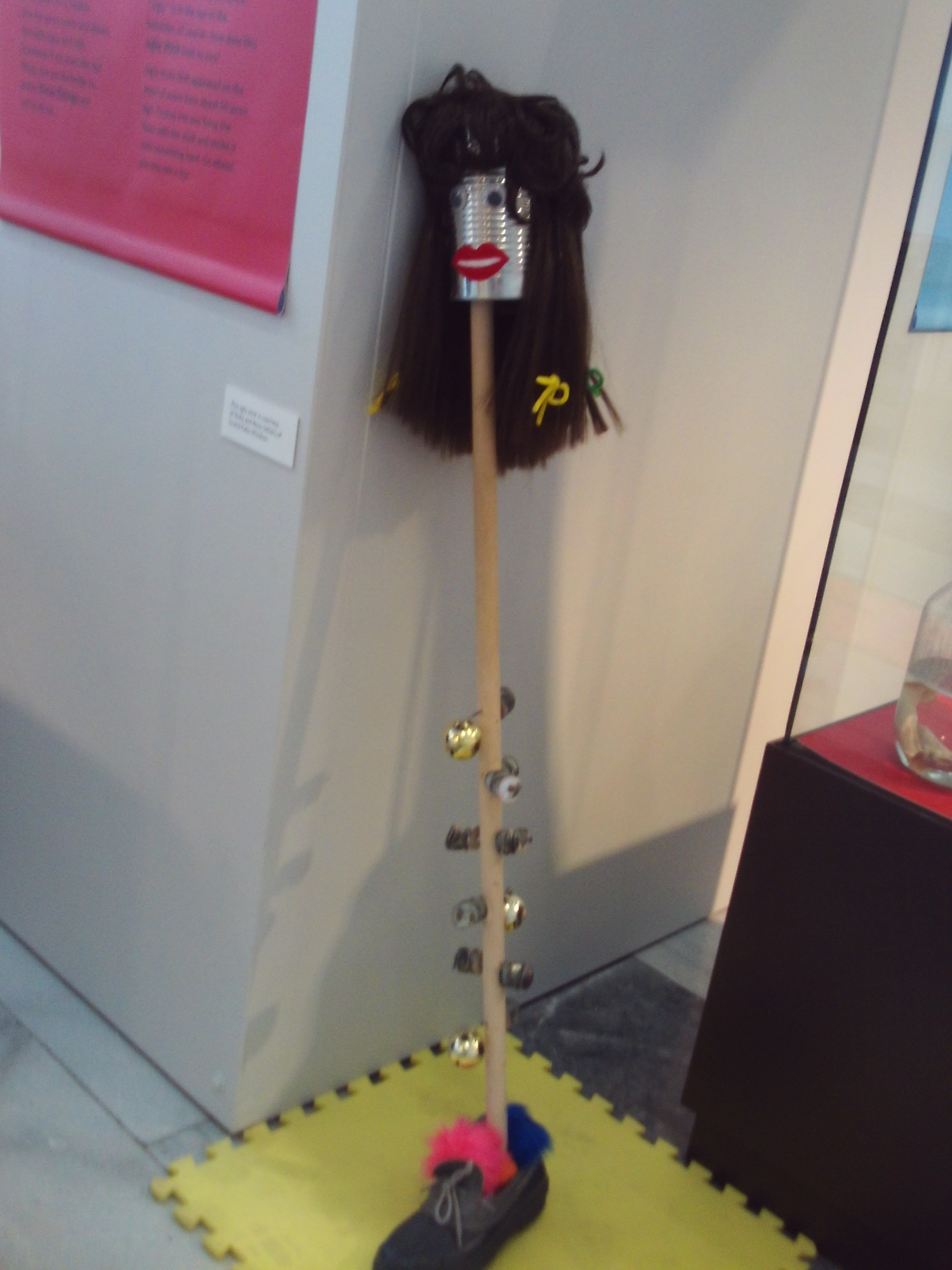
Ugly stick, has beer caps, like lagerphones. Is played with drumstick (like bumbass).

== See also ==
- Turkish crescent
- Bush band
- Ugly stick
- Boomba
