= Pogo cello =

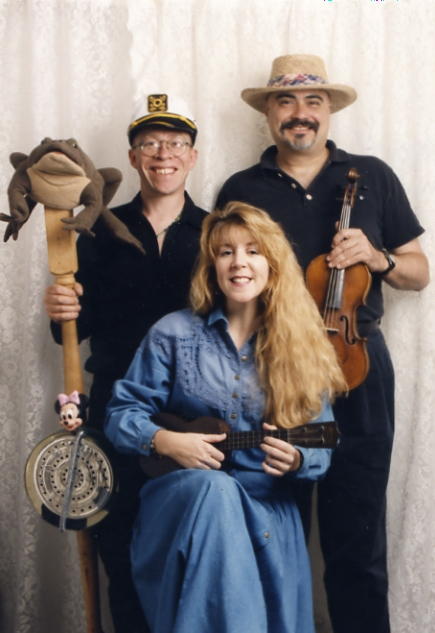
Pogo cello on left with folk band

The pogo cello is a percussion instrument in the idiophone family. This instrument can be heard in the skiffle bands of England, jug bands from the United States, as well as some blues, bluegrass, folk and rock bands. Notable musical groups or persons using the pogo cello in their music are Jim Kweskin's Jug Band, Mojo Nixon, Rend Collective, the Gloucester Hornpipe and Clog Society and Redd Foxx, the famous comedian/singer who starred as Fred Sanford in the television show Sanford and Son.

== Description ==
The pogo cello is also known as or very similar to a devil's stick, bumbass, stump fiddle, stumpf fiddle, humstrum, devil's violin, bladder and string, stick zither, basse de Flandre, jingling johnny, lagerphone, Turkish crescent, Chapeau Chinois, Pavillon Chinois, Party Fiddle, ugly stick, pound stick. The pogo cello, being a homemade folk instrument, has a configuration that is somewhat open to interpretation depending on the individual who creates it.

A typical description of the parts that might make a pogo cello are:

- A broom handle, pole, or a six-foot 2x3 piece of lumber.
- A spring fastened to the bottom of the wood.
- A cookie tin, tambourine, or any similar resonating device.
- A length of baling wire, attached to the top and bottom of the wood, stretched across the cookie tin or resonator.
- Any miscellaneous noisemakers that an individual might choose to attach anywhere on the pogo cello.

The instrument is thrust to the floor to make a bass drum sound, and a length of baling wire attached to a cookie tin is struck or bowed with a long threaded stick or dowel to make a snare drum sound.

== History ==
A musical instrument that appears to be a pogo cello was invented and first patented in 1951 by a carpenter named Vincent Lyle Badkin. According to his grandson, Vincent L. Badkin, he performed with a group in New Jersey called Zimmies Zombies. The pogo cello was commercially manufactured in the 1950s in Brooklyn, New York by a chemist and musical instrument manufacturer, Mack Perry, the husband of a music educator, Sylvia Perry. Apparently Badkin had asked Perry to manufacture the instrument. It is unclear what influenced Badkin in his design, perhaps a similar instrument called a bumbass (boombas, boomba, or boom bass) also known as a stump fiddle (or stumpf fiddle). Perry manufactured pogo cellos in Brooklyn and Far Rockaway, New York and in New Jersey. The pogo cello was sold across the United States for decades as a musical instrument for children, but many adults also bought them for themselves.

Pogo cellos have been seen in marching bands in Iowa and in the Mummers' parade in Philadelphia, PA on New Year's Day. Similar instruments may be found today in Australia, the Czech Republic, in Sweden (called a Devil's fiddle or Devil's stick) and in other countries, for example at Oktoberfests. They have been played in blues, soul, bluegrass and other kinds of musical groups. Television show host Garry Moore played one on his show in the 1950s. Since 1975 the Gloucester Hornpipe and Clog Society, an American traditional music group which plays Celtic, maritime, Quebecois, traditional American and other kinds of folk music, has featured a pogo cello made by woodcarver Rita Dunipace, and pogo cello player David "Doc" Rosen.
