= Bladder fiddle =

Musical instrument

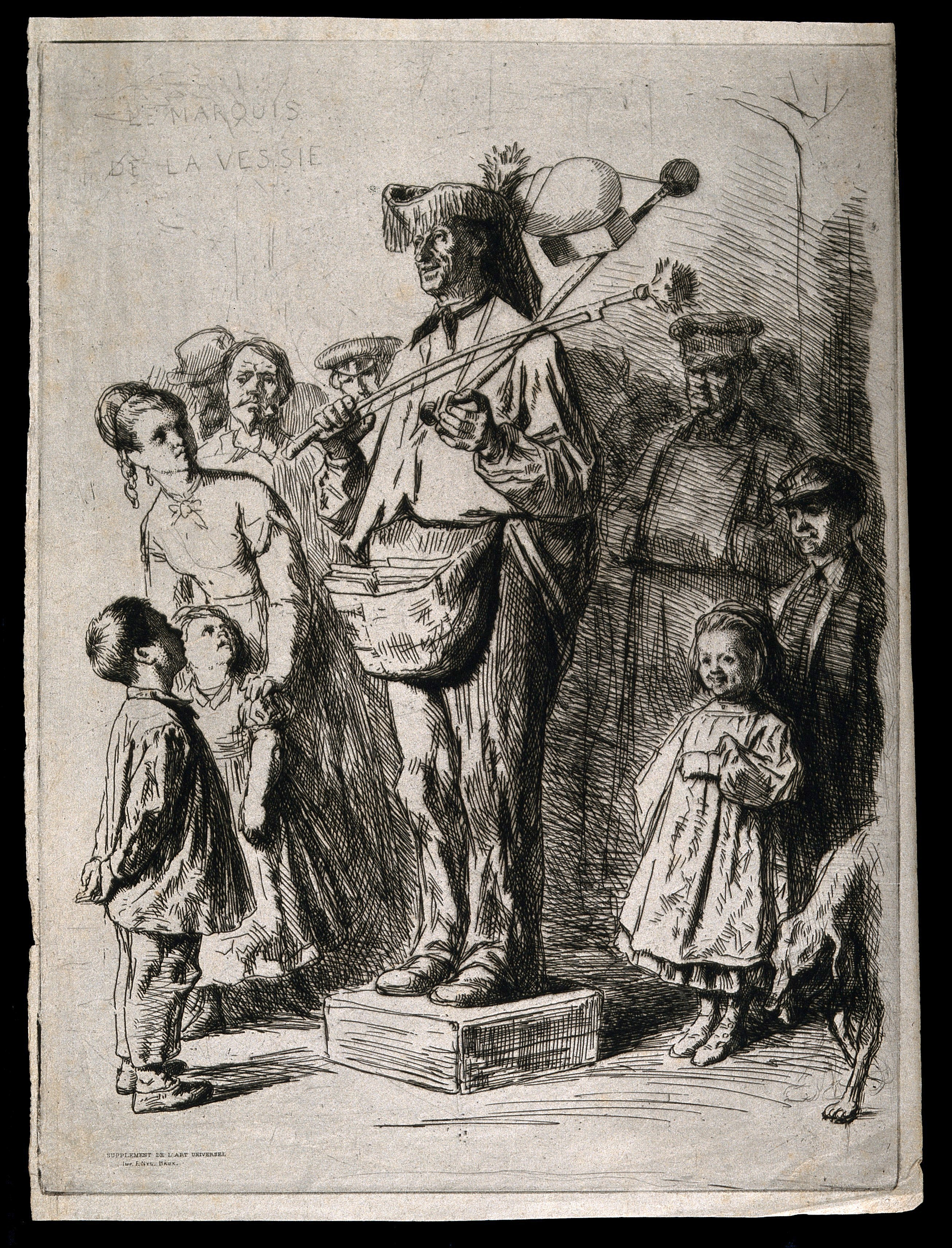
- "King of the Bladder." A man stands on a box holding a two-string bladder-fiddle. The mid-1870s image, a caricature, shows a perception that something is wrong with the musician.

String instrument
- Other names: drone, drone-and-string, boomba, bumbass, stamp fiddle, stumpf fiddle, pogo cello, Devil's stick, Devil's violin, boom bass, hum strum, teufel stick, stomp stick, Teufelsgeige (German, devil's fiddle), Bettelgeige (German, beggar's fiddle), saubass (Austrian-German), luk muzycyny (Polish), Diabelskie skrzypce (Polish, Devil's fiddle), rabel (Spanish), basse de Flandre (French, Flanders fiddle), pirunviulu (Finnish).
- Classification: String, percussion
- Hornbostel–Sachs classification: (MIMO puts all bumbasses together, whether percussion or fiddles. Hornbostel-Sachs doesn't consider number of strings. Drums and bladders not considered for resonators (only gourds). 311.22 True stick zithers. Other options musical bows 311.121.221.71 Mono-heterochord musical bows - The bow has one heterochord string only, with attached resonator and no tuning noose. Played with a bow. 311.122.1 Poly-heterochord musical bows - The bow has several heterochord strings, and no tuning noose.)

Related instruments
- Batih; Monkey stick; Ugly stick; Pogo cello; Turkish crescent; Violí de bufa; Whamola

The bladder fiddle was a folk instrument used throughout Europe and in the Americas. The instrument was originally a simple large stringed fiddle (a musical bow) made with a long stick, one or more thick gut strings, and a pig's-bladder resonator. It was bowed with either a notched stick or a horsehair bow.

The folk instrument was historically played by "wandering musicians" and beggars up to the early 19th century. Although it may be used in serious folk music it has also been used for humor.

Changes in the instrument have produced two distinct modern variations. The traditional bowed instrument has been preserved into the 21st century in Lithuania as the pusline (and possibly Estonia and Flanders), producing sustained or rhythmic droning notes. The other variation, a percussion instrument, is used in folk music internationally, including Europe, North America and Australia, in which sound may imitate a drum roll and other percussive sounds.

== Evolution from fiddle to drum set ==
The instrument was originally a fiddle. It used a flexible stick, a musical bow, as the instrument's body and neck. The resonator, at first an inflated animal bladder, was held between the stick and the bowstring. Versions in Poland, Lithuania and the Netherlands had as many as three strings, but pictures of the Flanders fiddle and the Nocturnal Serenade by Jan Steen show monochords (single-stringed instruments). In this configuration, the fiddle is played by drawing the bow over the string or strings; pressing down on the string changes the note. Having multiple strings allows a fiddler to accompany other instruments with simple patterns using one, two or three notes from open strings. Some variants of the instrument show a flexible stick, making the bowed-instrument a musical bow. Others, such as the Estonian and Lithuanian instruments, have rigid sticks, making the instrument a bar or stick zither.

The instrument changed in some places. While the pig-bladder instrument can still be found in Lithuania today, in Holland the pig's bladder had been replaced by 1675 by a drum-like circle, wedged between the stick and a single gutstring, which resonated when the string was bowed. That version, the bumbass, was illustrated in the painting Nocturnal Serendade, by Dutch painter Jan Steen.

Immigrants to the United States brought the bumbass with them. In America, it used by the Pennsylvania Dutch culture of eastern Pennsylvania, United States, and still exists today, as the boomba, a percussion instrument. It may also be seen in Texas, at events celebrating local German heritage (such as the Tomball German Heritage Festival).

On percussion instruments, the drum has been turned sideways on the instrument and the string runs across it like the sound-table on a spike lute. The string has been dropped in some cases, the bow stick becoming a drumstick and the instrument now a percussion instrument, called a boomba, stamp fiddle, stumpf fiddle, or pogo cello. Also called Devil's stick, Devil's violin, boom bass, hum strum, teufel stick or stomp stick. In the percussion instrument, the string may still have limited use as a chordophone, if it has been set up with a tuning peg to tighten the string; if used in this manner, the instrument is bowed with a notched stick, producing rough sounds. In some modern instruments, the string has been replaced by a long spring, solely a percussion instrument, and in other instruments the string has been dropped altogether. The Polish Diabelskie skrzypce (Devil's fiddle) often has no string, but includes the memory of the instrument's past, by placing a violin-shaped piece of wood on the instrument.

This percussion version of the instrument is international, being used in Denmark (called the Rumsterstang or the krigsdjaevel, lit. 'war devil') and Germany as well as the United States. Boomba is highly likely to have come from German Bumbaß [pronounced "BOOM-bahss"]; bum possibly coming from an older form of brummen ("to hum") and baß ("bass", as in music).

During World War I, German soldiers made Stumpf fiddles or Teufelsgeiges (lit. 'devil's fiddles'), replacing the pig's bladder with a tin can for the resonator, and bowing with a notched stick. Other bowed instruments were created using a wooden box for the resonator.

Today, there are two types of the instrument, bowed and percussion. The Stumpf fiddle became a percussion instrument, beaten with a stick and stamped on the ground to shake attached wrattles, bells and cymbals. The instrument may have a string, or not. It is also called Devil's stick, pogo cello, boom-ba, boom bass, hum strum, devil's violin, teufel stick.

== Other names ==
It is known under different names; in Germany it was called the bumbass, Teufelsgeige (devil's fiddle) or Bettelgeige (beggar's fiddle). In Germany sometimes a bell or cymbal was added to the top for decoration or additional sound. In Austria it was called the saubass, in Spanish the rabel.

In France it is the basse de Flandre (Flanders fiddle), and in England a drone, "drone and string" or bladder fiddle. In England it was used by traveling musicians. In Venezuela, the bladder fiddle is known as "marimba, tarimba, guarumba, guasdua, and carangano". The name in Latvian is pūšļa vijole. In Lithuania, the instrument is the Pūslinė.

In Poland there is a variant that started as a costume accessory and has become a devil's violin, called the Diabelskie skrzypce.

=== Slavic instrument ===
The Slavic peoples have a musical bow (Słowiański łuk muzyczny in Polish) which is pictured as having three strings (trzy struny).

== Gallery ==
Hornbostel-Sachs classification are first in captions, then place and date.

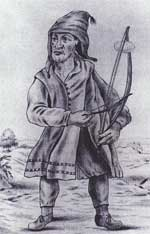
311.121.221. Flanders, 1600s. La Bass de la Flanders, in which the pig's bladder is attached to a handheld instrument, a musical bow.

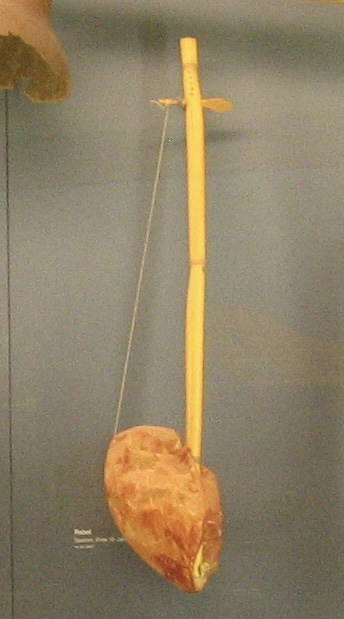
Bladder fiddle with a deflated bladder.

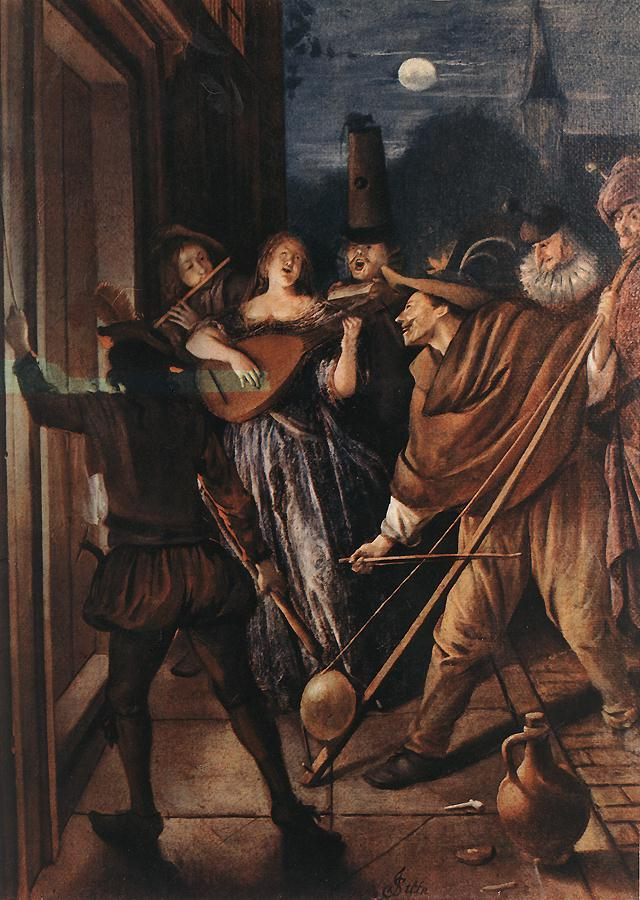
311.121.221. Netherlands, c. 1675. Man in the foreground playing a "bumbass", from Nocturnal Serenade, by Jan Steen.

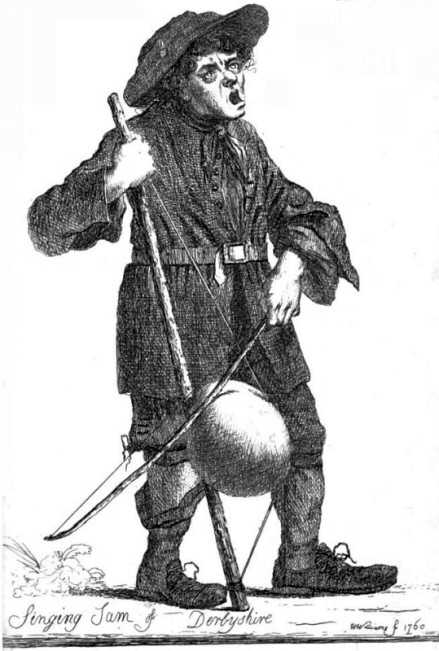
Circa 1760, Singing Sam of Derbyshire, with his instrument, made from a "fully-inflated cow's bladder.

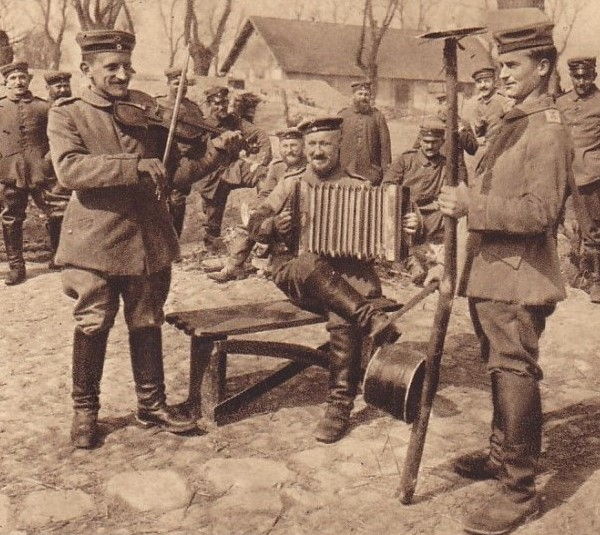
311.22. Germany, 1917. Teufelsgeige, bowed with notched stick but also had element of percussion, metal plates on top

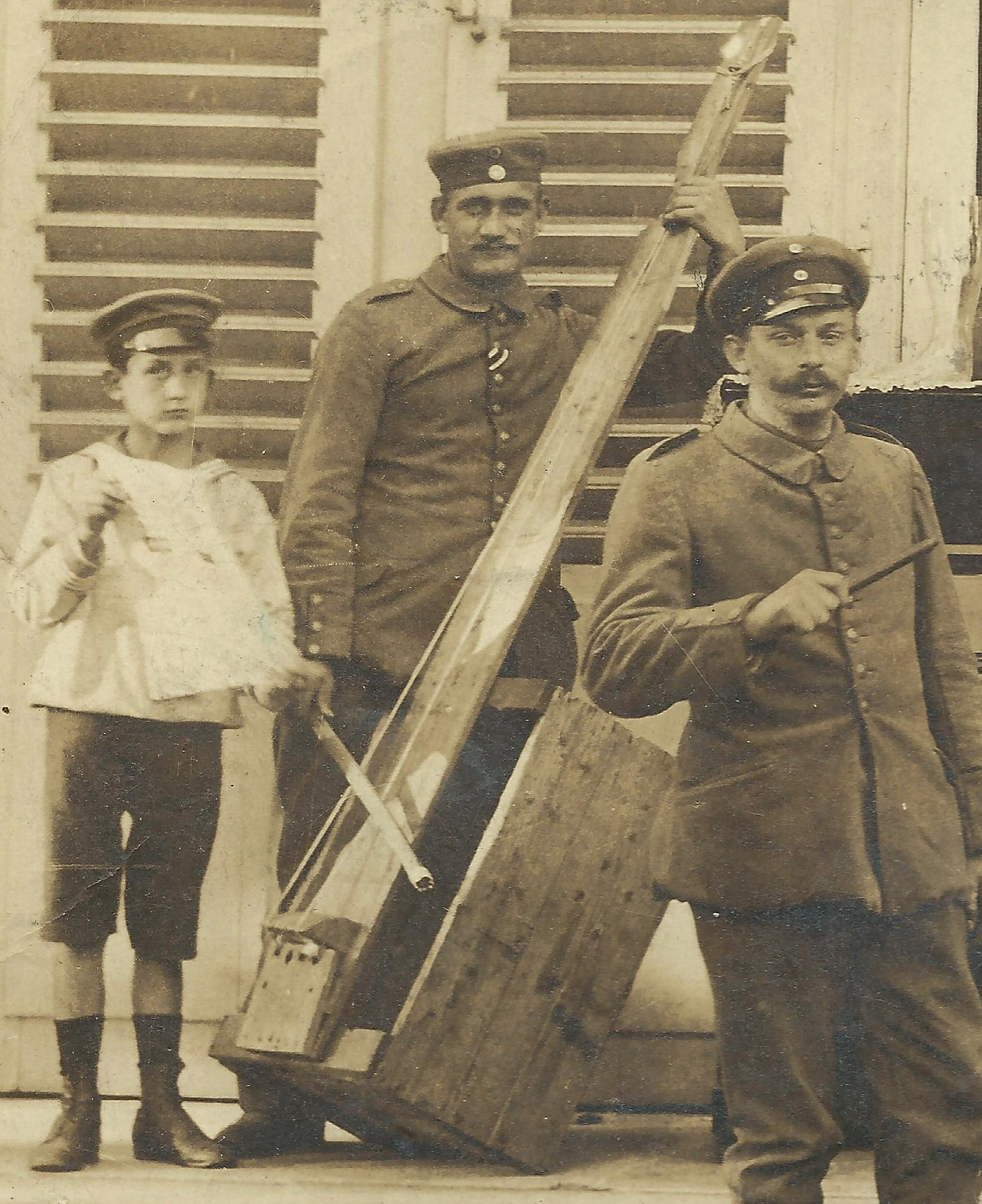
Bass made from a box, in bumbass tradition

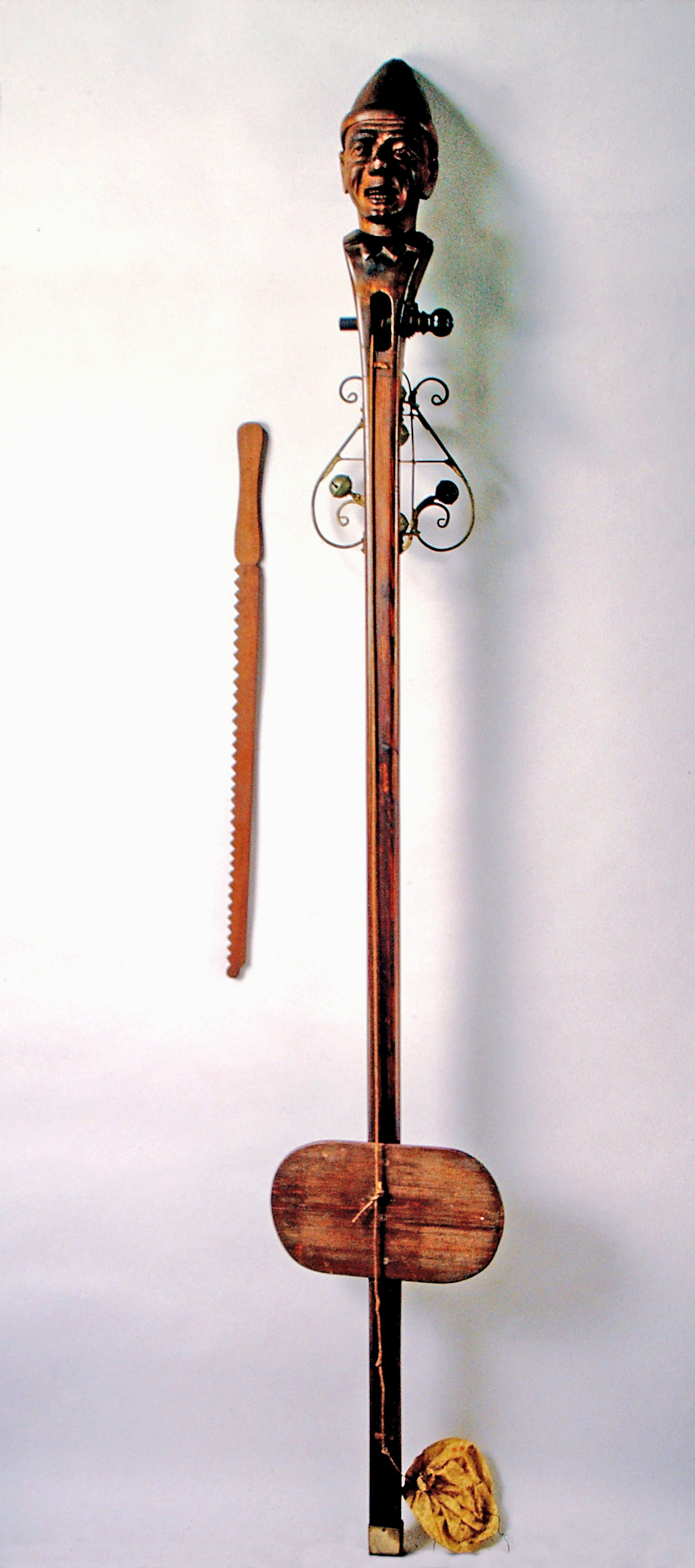
19th century boombass, from the Metropolitan Museum of Art. The bladder is shriveled up at the bottom.

== Modern bowed instrument ==
The original pig-bladder instrument is still played with a bow in Lithuania as a traditional folk instrument, called a Pūslinė. Estonia has one as well, called the põispill. The instrument has between 1-3 strings and can be tuned with tuning pegs.

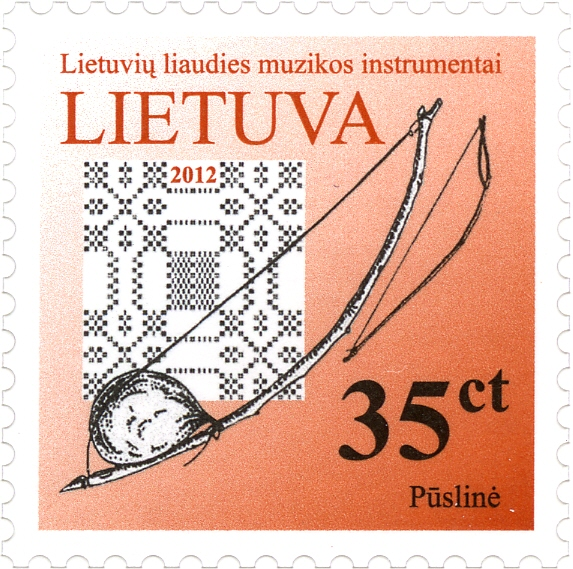
Lithuanian pūslinė.

== Modern percussion instrument ==
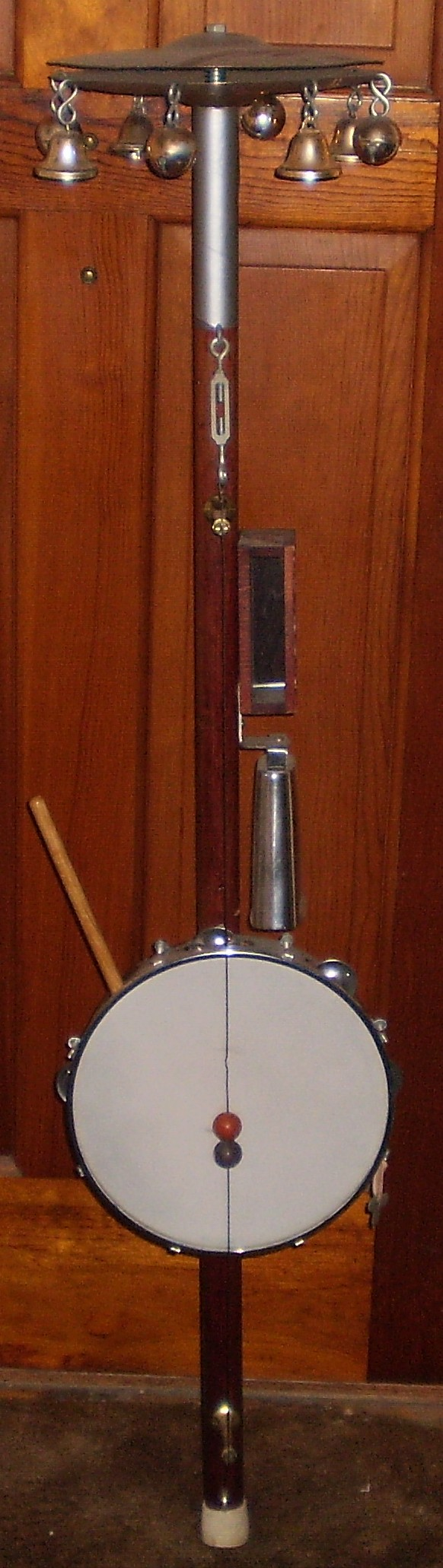
A modern boomba or bumbass blurs the lines between the bumbass instruments and the Jingling Johnny-Turkish crescent, by adding bells to the top.

The modern boomba focuses heavily on loud percussion, typically consisting of a variety of percussion instruments attached to a wooden pole. The exact designs of a boomba vary, with much emphasis being put on the personalization of the boomba. Common features typically include a spring-loaded rubber base (much like a pogo stick), with percussion instruments such as bells and wood blocks attached. Boombas often also include a set of cymbals which crash as the boomba is bounced, and a tambourine which can be played with a drumstick or shaken as the boomba is played.

The boomba is similar in nature to the "stumpf fiddle", though the stumpf fiddle generally lacks the loud crashing cymbal on top. It is this loud crash when bounced that makes the boomba distinct. An older, German variant of the stumpf fiddle and the boomba is the Teufelsgeige (lit. 'Devil's fiddle'), which is decorated with a Devil's head at the top of the pole.

A modern percussion instrument in Friesland is called the Kuttepiel. A similar percussion instrument in Slovakia is the Ozembuch.

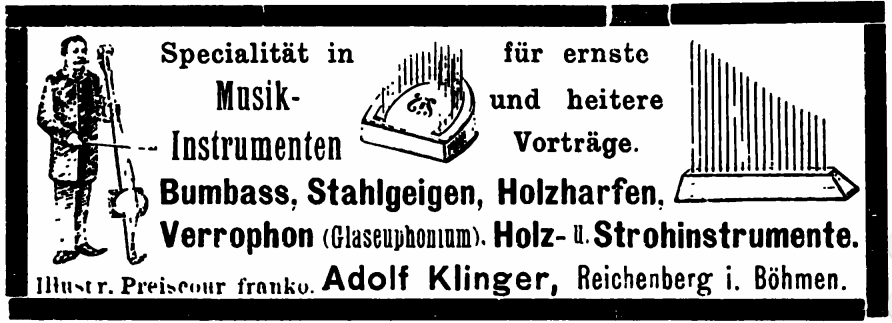
Advertisement in 1891 in Leipzig, Germany for a bumbass

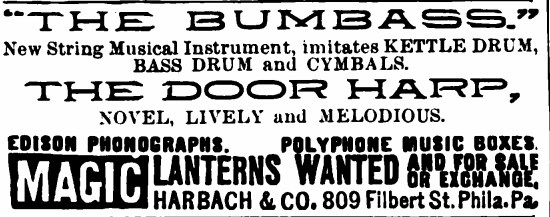
Advertisement in 1894, New York, for bumbass.

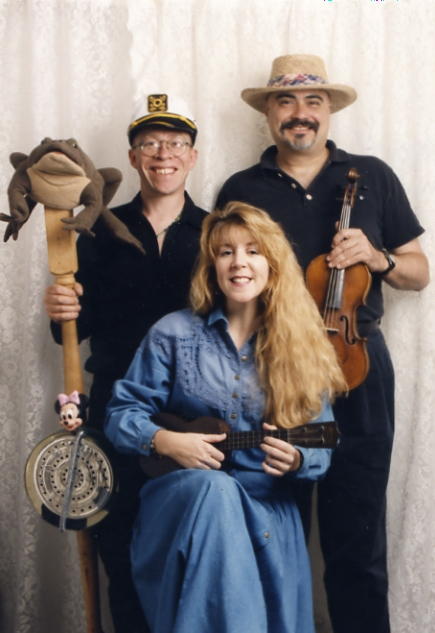
311.22. Modern pogo cello

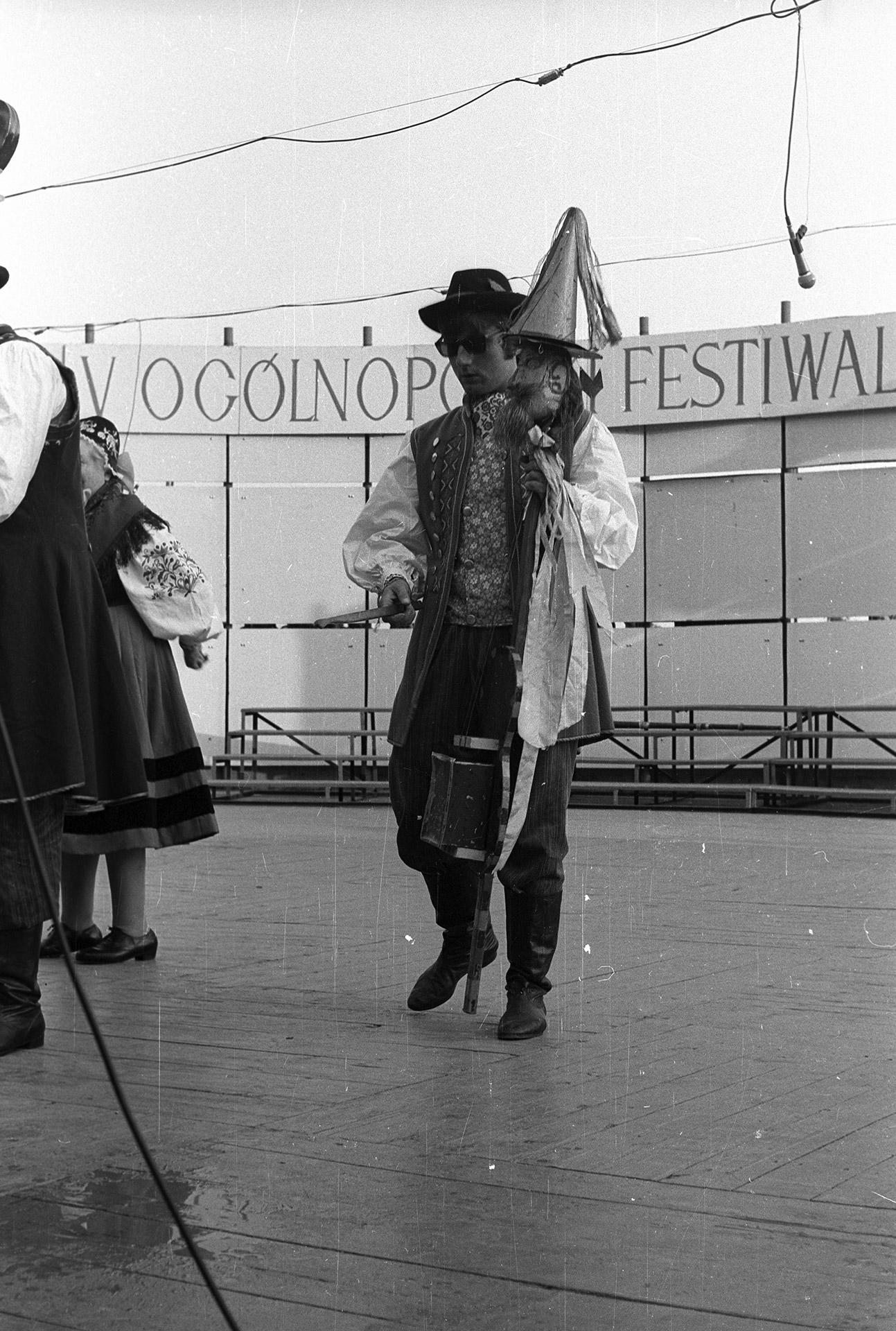
311.22. Polish Diabelskie skrzypce (Devil's Fiddle)

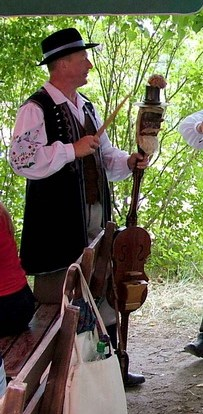
311.22. Polish percussion instrument called a Diabelskie skrzypce (Devil's Fiddle)

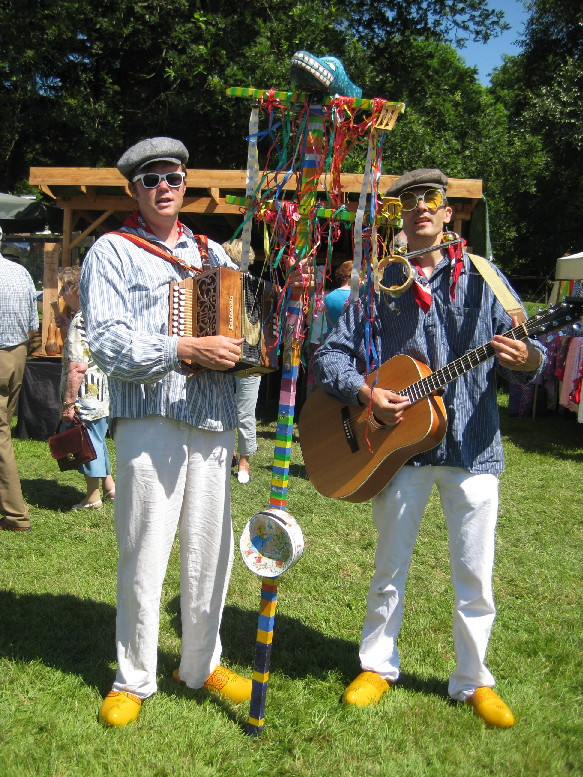
311.22. A Dutch and Frisian Kuttepiel. No string but bumbass style tin-can.

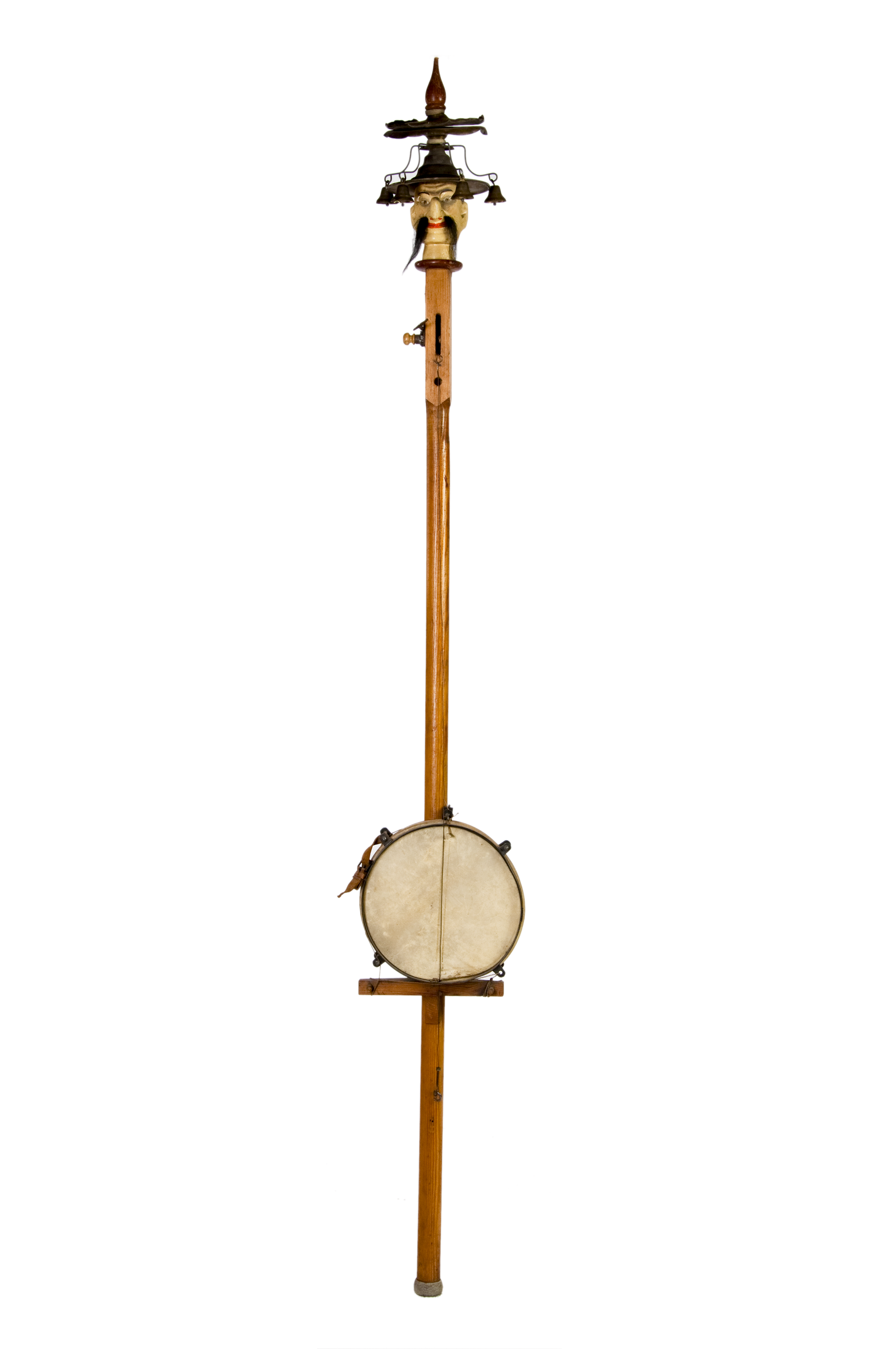
311.22. Germany, date unknown. Bumbass with cymbals and Turkish crescent hat on top.

== See also ==
- Bladder pipe
- Bar zither
- Jauram Estonian instrument, percussion "umba"
