= You'll Always Find Me in the Kitchen at Parties =

Single by Jona Lewie
- B-side: "Bureaucrats"
- Released: 1980
- Genre: Synth-pop
- Length: 2:41
- Label: Stiff
- Songwriters: Keith Trussell, Jona Lewie
- Producer: Bob Andrews

Jona Lewie singles chronology
"God Bless Whoever Made You" (1979)	"You'll Always Find Me in the Kitchen at Parties" (1980)	"Big Shot - Momentarily" (1980)

Music video
- "You'll Always Find Me In The Kitchen At Parties" (Top of the Pops 1980) on YouTube

"You'll Always Find Me in the Kitchen at Parties" is a song by English singer-songwriter Jona Lewie. It was written by Lewie and Keef Trouble, and was released as a single in 1980. The song entered the UK Singles Chart in May, reaching number 16 and staying for 11 weeks on the chart. The song experienced the greatest success in New Zealand, where it reached No. 3 in October for two weeks, remaining in the top 40 for 17 weeks.

Lewie added a new storyline ending to Trouble's lyrics. He wrote the melody on a multi-timbre polyphonic Polymoog in his home eight-track studio, and played on and recorded the backing track entirely himself, apart from bass guitar from Norman Watt-Roy and additional hi-hat percussion from Bob Andrews. It has been claimed that the female backing vocal is by Kirsty MacColl, but Lewie has confirmed that during the recording of the song they were done by the wives of producer Andrews and Dave Robinson, the owner of Stiff Records. MacColl did however appear as a backing vocalist during live performances.

In 2010, the track was used to advertise kitchens for IKEA. The full version of the advert, which ran for three minutes, features the group Man Like Me walking around a party in a house comprising only kitchens while singing a new version of the song. Lewie himself appeared as the host of the party. The song returned to the UK Singles Chart in 2010 reaching number 71.

== Charts ==
=== Weekly charts ===
Chart (1980)	Peak position
Australia (Kent Music Report)	21
New Zealand	3
UK (Official Charts Company)	16

=== Year-end charts ===
Chart (1980)	Position
Australia (Kent Music Report)	90
