= Brett Marvin and the Thunderbolts =

British band (1968–2013)

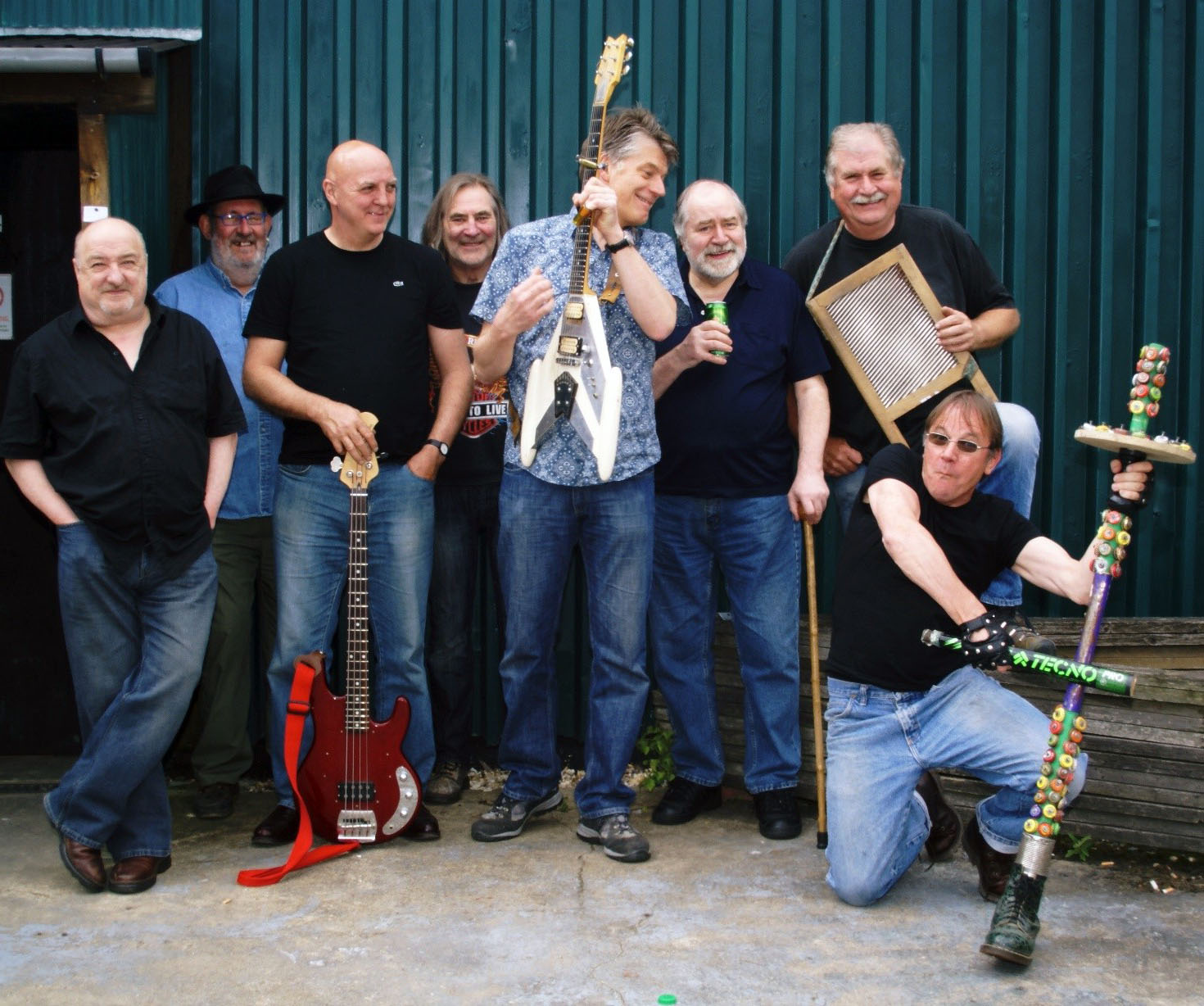
- Brett Marvin and the Thunderbolts in 2009

Background information
- Origin: Crawley, England
- Genres: Blues
- Years active: 1968–2013
- Labels: Sonet; Exson; Clan Celentano
- Spinoffs: Terry Dactyl and the Dinosaurs
- Spinoff of: The Johnston City Jazz Band
- Past members: Taffy Davies; Peter Gibson; Graham Hine; Jona Lewie; Jim Pitts; John Randall; Doug Strathie; Peter Swan; Keef Trouble

Brett Marvin and the Thunderbolts were a British club and touring blues band, formed in 1968, and later a rarely performing pub band. Under the pseudonym Terry Dactyl and the Dinosaurs they released "Seaside Shuffle", a novelty single that reached No. 2 in the UK Singles Chart in 1972.

== Background ==
Brett Marvin and The Thunderbolts originally comprised school pupils and staff from Thomas Bennett School in Crawley, West Sussex, England. An early line-up was Dave Arnot (drums), Pete Gibson (trombone/vocals/percussion), Graham Hine (guitar) and Jim Pitts (guitar/vocals/harmonica), with John Randall and Keith Trussell (percussionists). The band was later joined by John Lewis (Jona Lewie) as vocalist, songwriter and keyboardist. Further personnel changes included Pete Swan (bass), Doug Strathie (bass) and Taffy Davies (vocals/keyboard/clarinet/mandolin) who joined the band after the departure of John Lewis, who had left to pursue a solo career after the band's first breakup. Instrumentation included "bizarre inventions", such as an 'electric ironing board' and a lagerphone, band-named a 'Zobstick'.

== Career ==
Brett Marvin and the Thunderbolts' debut album was the 1970 Brett Marvin and the Thunderbolts. This was issued in Italy on the Clan Celentano label. and on Sonet in the UK.

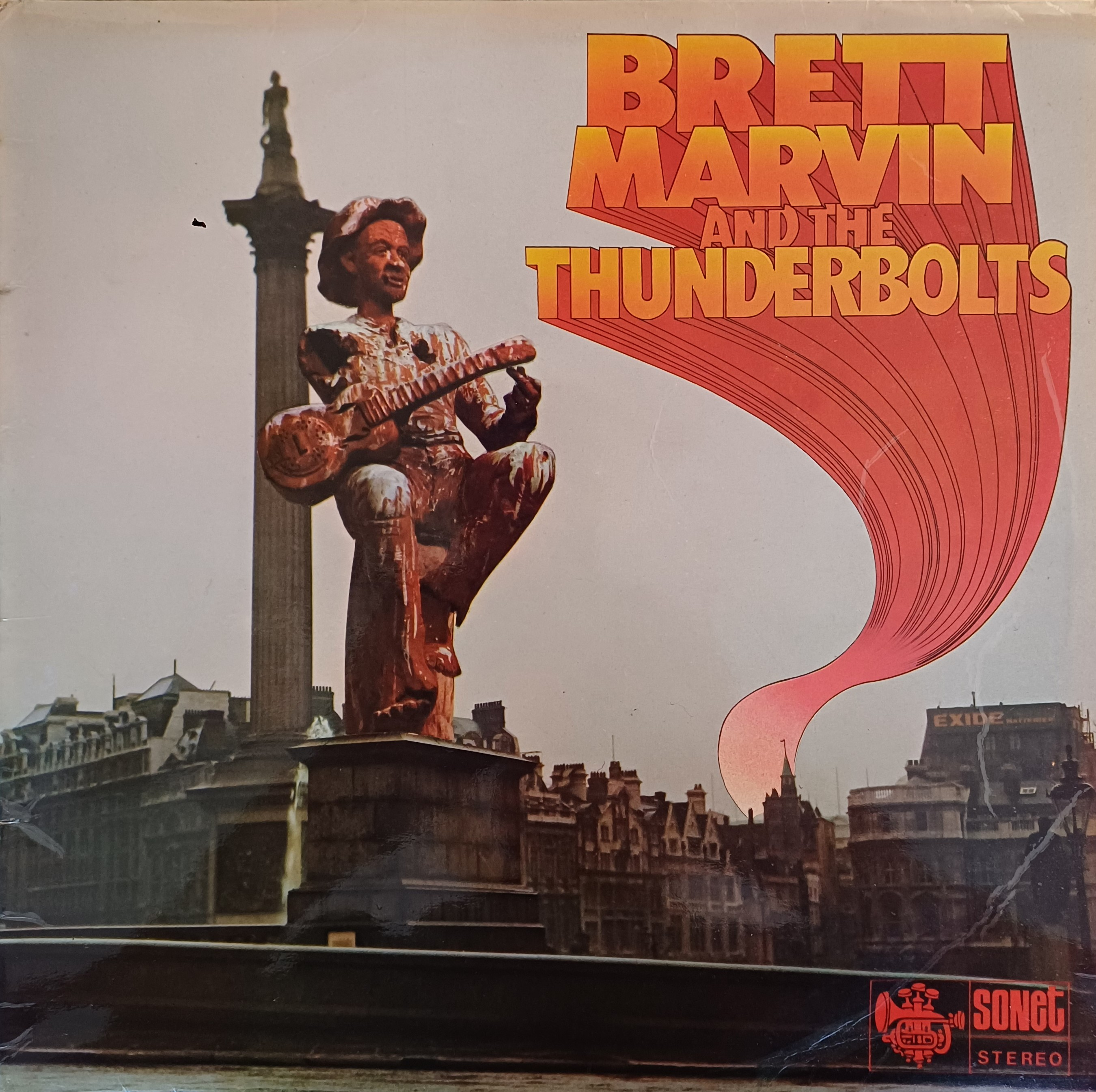
Self-explanatory title

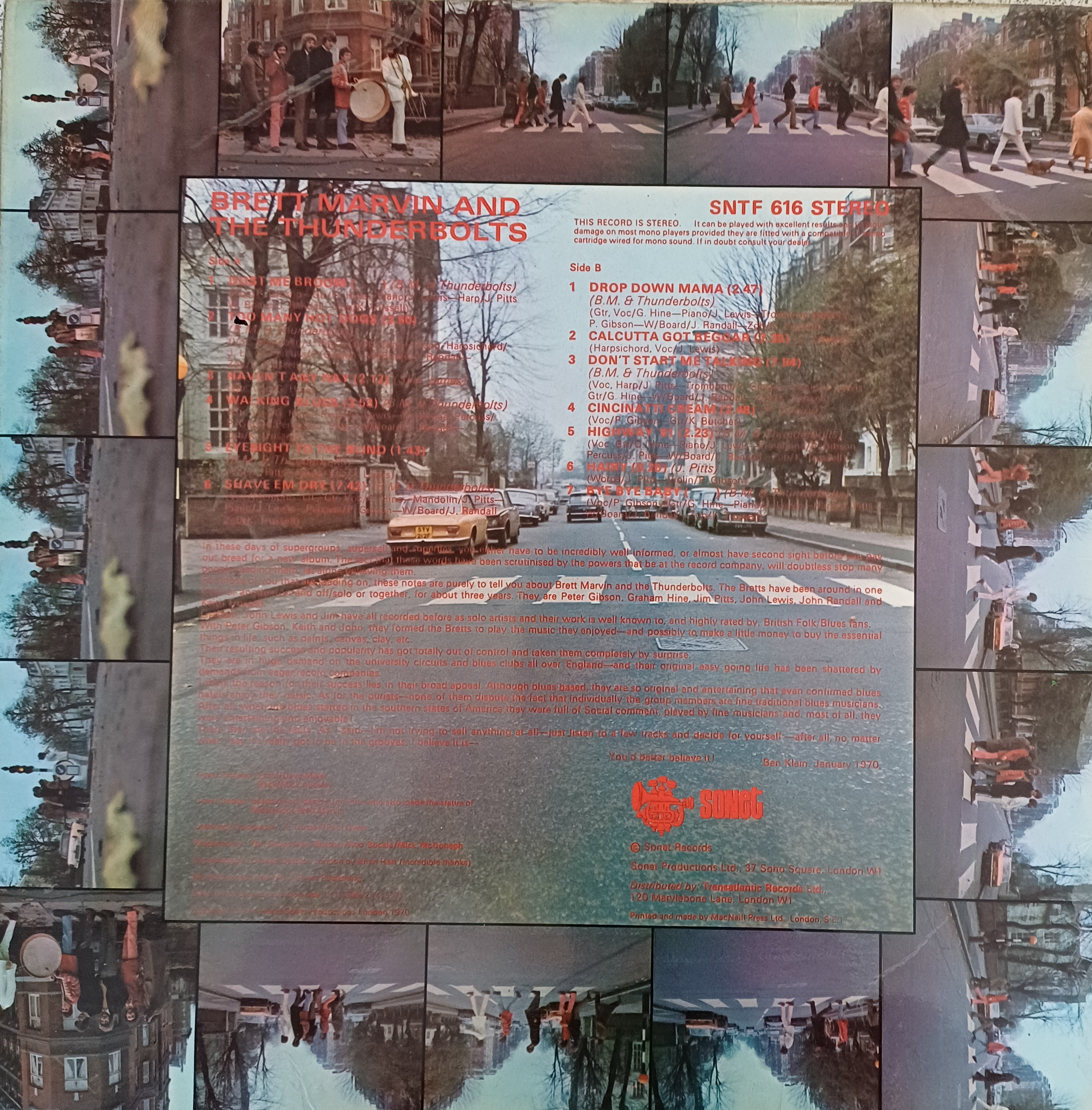
Self-explanatory

It was followed by Twelve Inches of Brett Marvin and Best of Friends in 1971, Alias Terry Dactyl in 1972, and Ten Legged Friends in 1973, all for Sonet Records. In 1993, the band released Boogie Street under the Exson label. Following their first album the band, under the pseudonym Terry Dactyl and the Dinosaurs, released "Seaside Shuffle", a novelty single written by Jona Lewie, that eventually reached No. 2 in the UK chart in 1972. Further releases under Terry Dactyl and the Dinosaurs were not successful.

Band members Taffy Davies died in June 2010, Jim Pitts in 2012, John Randall and Peter Gibson in 2021.
