= Violí de bufa =

The violí de bufa is Catalan instrument, a type of bladder fiddle, made of a pig's bladder connected to a bowed stick of cane, over which pass one to three strings, that are "bowed" with another knobby stick, as though playing the double bass.

In Ripoll and other places bordering the Ter, the instrument is traditionally played during Carnestoltes (Carnival), and produces a deep and dull sound, like a simbomba marina.

The instrument has been labeled primitive and unrefined, but despite its limited repertoire historically found popularity with peasant dances and popular songs.

Bufa is Aragonese for "pig's bladder." The word means "buffoonery" in Spanish.

== See also ==
- Bladder fiddle
