= Bladder pipe =

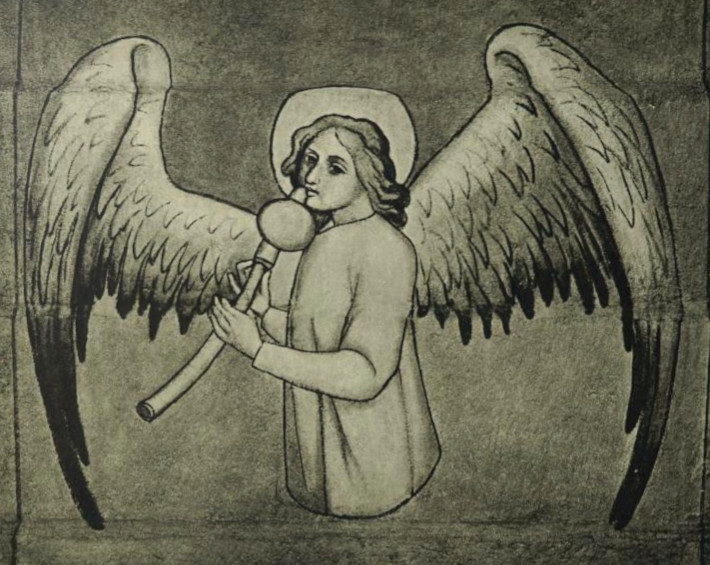
Bladder pipe, at Karlštejn Castle, Czech Republic

The bladder pipe (German: Platerspiel or Blaterpfeife) is a medieval simplified bagpipe, consisting of an insufflation tube (blow pipe), a bladder (bag) and a chanter, sounded by a double reed, which is fitted into a reed seat at the top of the chanter. The reed, inside the inflated bladder, is sounded continuously, and cannot be tongued. Some bladder pipes were made with a single drone pipe, and reproductions are similar to a loud, continuous crumhorn. The chanter has an outside tenon, at the top, near the reed, which fits into a socket or stock, which is then tied into the bladder.

== History ==
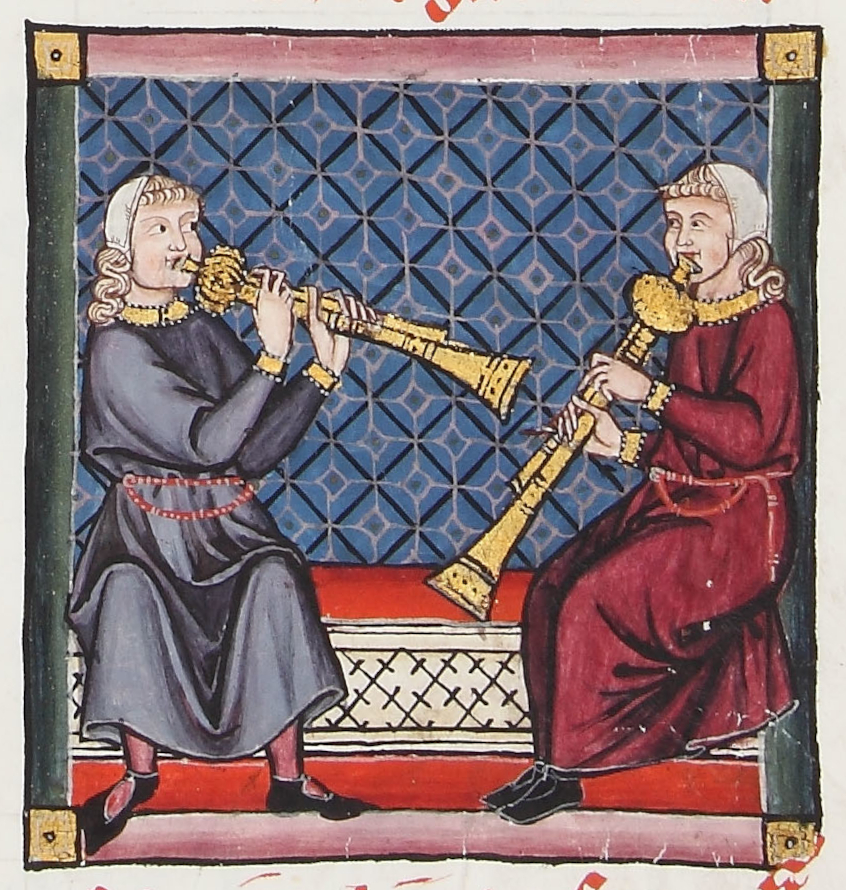
Bladder pipes from the Cantigas de Santa Maria, circa 1280 A.D.

While the first creation of a double reed pipe with a bladder controlling breath is unknown, it is believed to have originated in Europe before the 13th century. As an intermediate phase between the almost pan-European bagpipe and the Renaissance crumhorn, the Bladder pipe flourished from the 14th to 16th centuries.

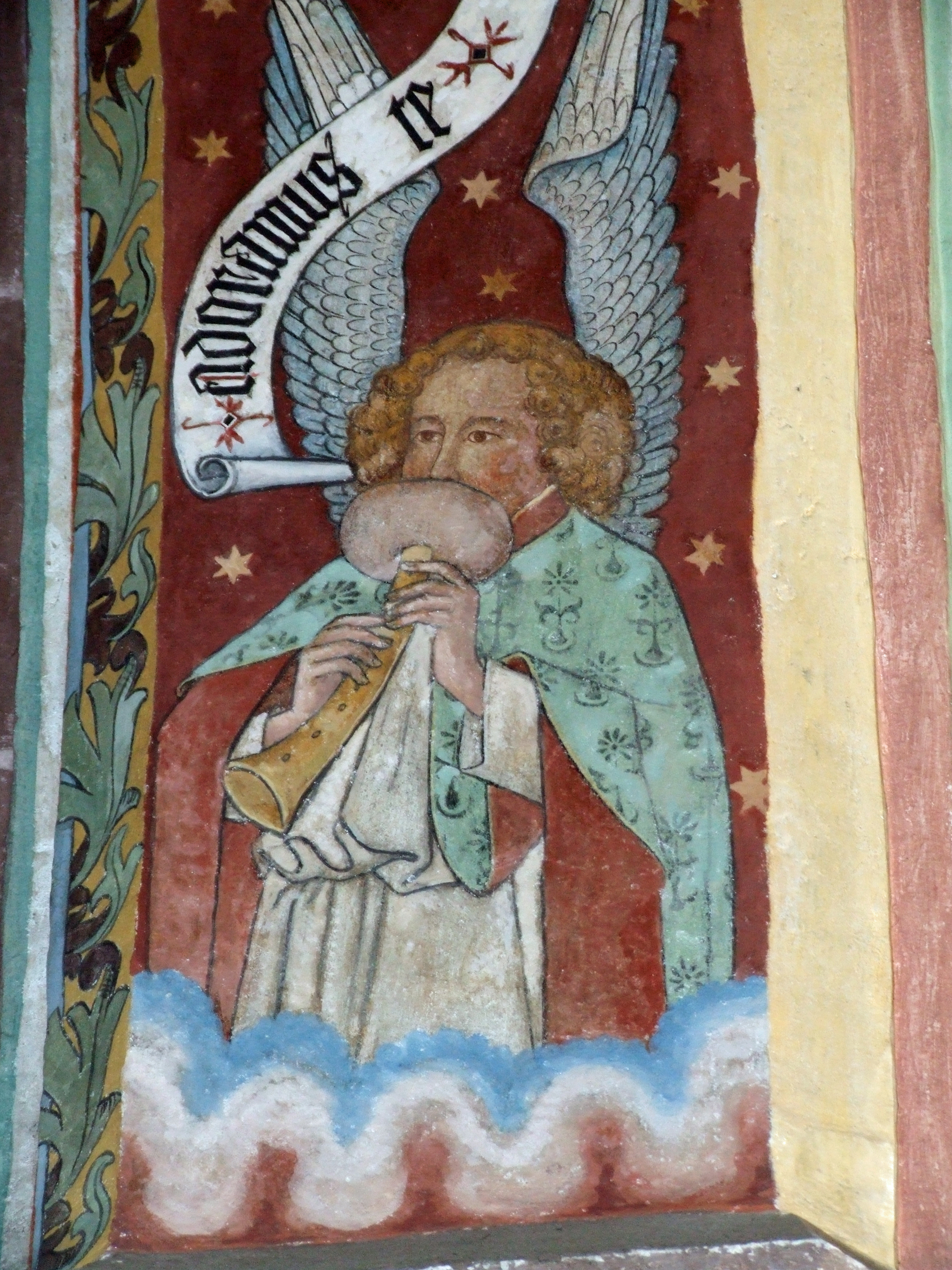
Bladder pipe playing angel Frauenkirche, Memmingen, Germany about 1460

Examples have been found from Germany, Poland, England, France, Italy, Spain (called the odrecillo) and Estonia (called the rakkopilli). As it declined in popularity, it became associated with beggars and peasants.

The early bladder pipe is in a family of the early medieval "chorus" instruments, a word which in medieval Latin was frequently used also for the bagpipe. In the earliest illustrated forms of bladder pipe, such as the well-known example of the 13th century reproduced by Martin Gerbert from a manuscript at Sankt Blasien Abbey in the Black Forest, the bladder is unusually large, and the chanter (or melody pipe) has, instead of a bell, the carved head of an animal. At first the chanter was a straight conical tube terminating in a bell, as in the bagpipe. The later instruments have a pipe of larger calibre more or less curved and bent back as in the letter "J" as the crumhorn, tournebout, and cromorne. This curvature, coming from the shape of an animal horn, suggests the early crumhorn's development from a bladder pipe. One famous illustration of these bladder pipes appears in the 13th-century Spanish manuscript, known as the Cantigas de Santa Maria in the library of El Escorial in Madrid, together with a bladder pipe having two pipes, a chanter and a drone side by side. Another Platerspiel David is illustrated by Sebastian Virdung (1511).

== Other forms ==
There was practically no technical difference between the bent chanter of the bladder pipe and the cromorne, the only distinction being the form and size of the air-chamber, either the bladder or the wind-cap, in which the reed was set in vibration. The player blows air into the bladder through the insufflation tube, or through the raised, slit-shaped opening of the wind cap, placed against the player's lips. This earlier Italian form of bladder pipe is found illustrated at the end of the 15th century in the Book of Hours, known as the Sforza Book.

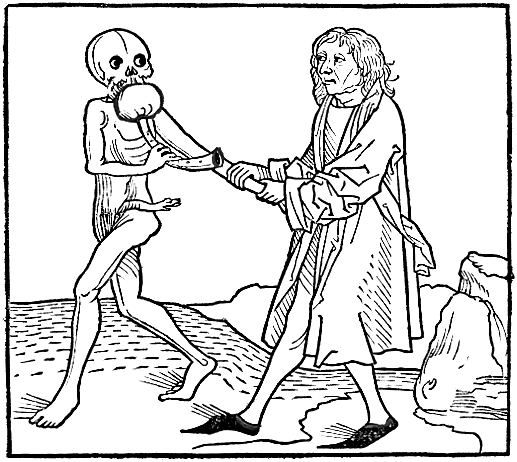
The burgomeister and Death, showing Death with a bladder-pipe. From the Heidelberger Totentanz, c. 1488.

== In literature ==
An allusion to the bladder pipe occurs in an old English ballad:

Eight shepherds were playing on various instruments: "The fyrst hed ane drone bagpipe, the next hed ane pipe maid of ane bleddir and of ane reid, the third playit on ane trump."

This excerpt suggests the early English bladder pipe retained a distinct form, and did not become merged with the bagpipe.

== See also ==
- Pig bladder
- Bladder fiddle
