= Odrecillo =

Medieval Iberian small bagpipe

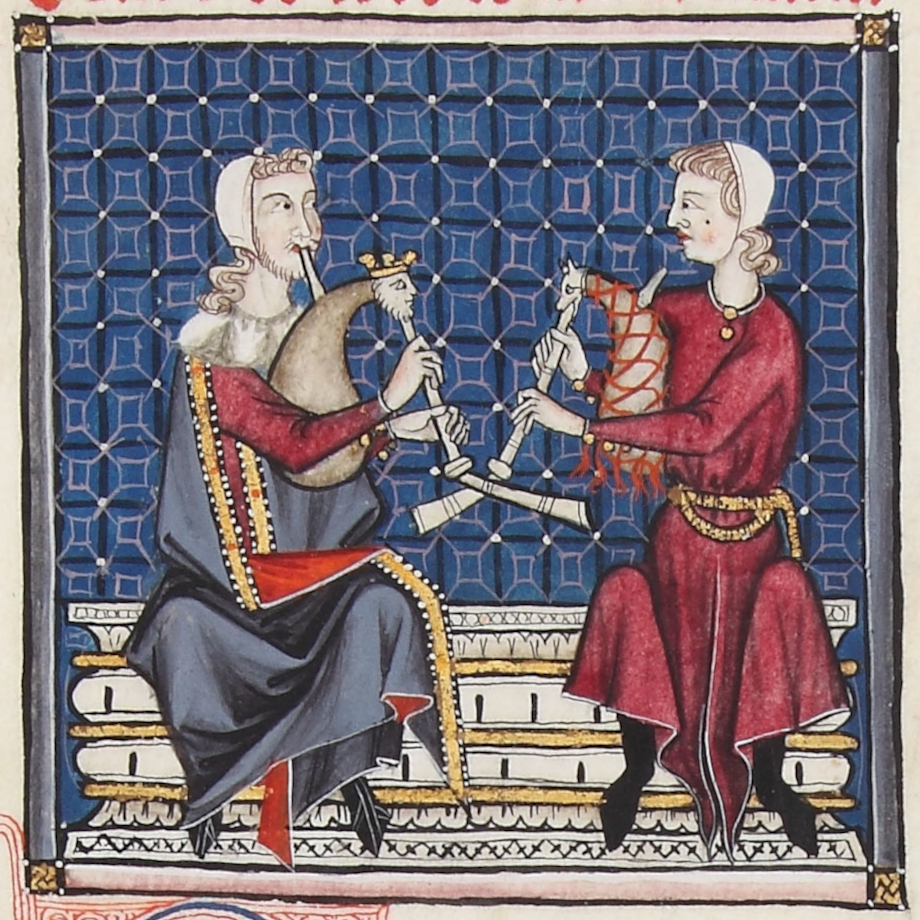
An illumination from the 13th Century Cantigas de Santa Maria, showing small droneless bagpipes, labeled in some sources as "odrecillo".

The odrecillo was a small bagpipe of medieval Iberia (modern Spain and Portugal). The instrument is found with or without drones.

The term is derived from the word odre ("goatskin"). This term has also been applied to a different instrument, the bladder pipe.

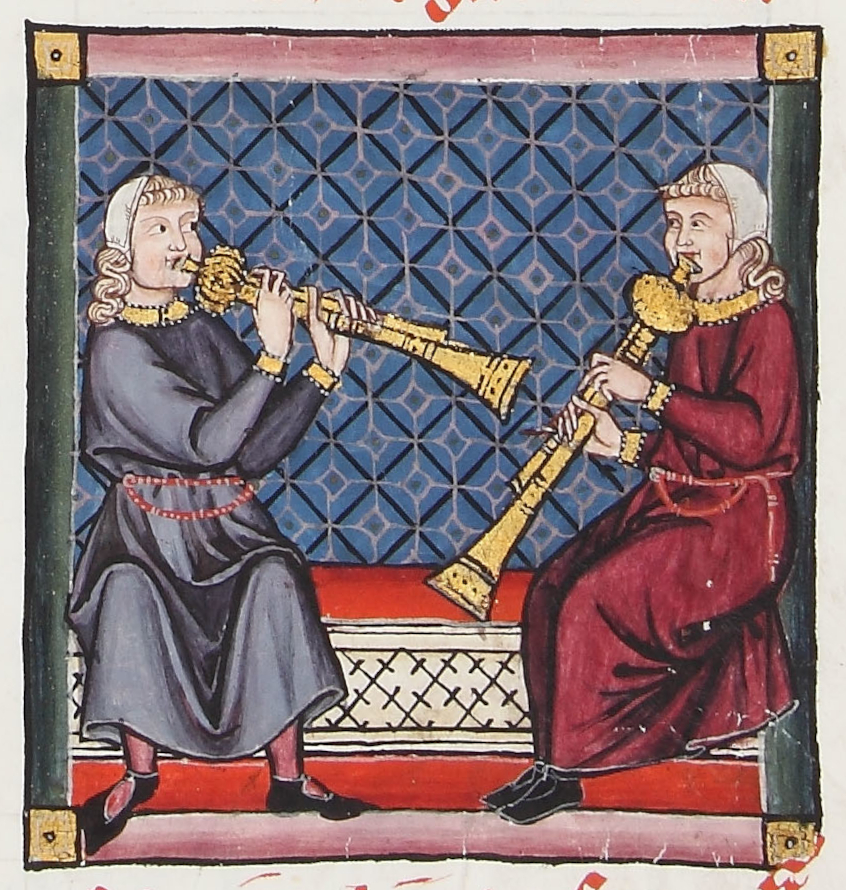
1280 A.D., Spain. Bladder pipes from the Cantigas de Santa Maria, Musician's Codex.
