= Jona Lewie =

English singer-songwriter (born 1947)

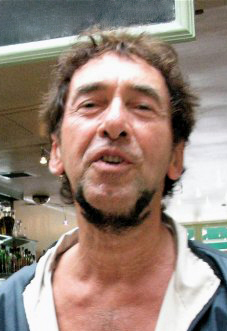
- Lewie in 2010

Background information
- Born: John Lewis; 14 March 1947 (age 79); Southampton, England
- Genres: Pop, rock, blues, new wave
- Instruments: Vocals, keyboards, guitar
- Years active: 1963–present
- Labels: Stiff, Sonet, Union Square Music
- Formerly of: The Johnston City Jazz Band; Brett Marvin and the Thunderbolts; Terry Dactyl and the Dinosaurs; The Jive Bombers
- Website: jonalewie.com

Jona Lewie (born John Lewis; 14 March 1947) is an English singer-songwriter and multi-instrumentalist, best known for his 1980 UK hits "You'll Always Find Me in the Kitchen at Parties" and "Stop the Cavalry".

== Career ==
=== Early career ===
Lewie joined his first group, the Johnston City Jazz Band, while still at school in 1963, and by 1968 had become a blues and boogie singer and piano player. In 1969, as a singer/songwriter, he contributed compositions and recordings for the compilation album I Asked for Water She Gave Me... Gasoline on the Liberty/UA label. Other compositions in 1969 were for the album These Blues Is Meant to Be Barrel Housed on the Yazoo/Blue Goose label in New York, still as a solo artist known as John Lewis.

=== Brett Marvin and the Thunderbolts ===
In 1969, he became acquainted with the blues band Brett Marvin and the Thunderbolts, which was holding a residency at London's Studio 51 club, joining as a vocalist and piano player. When he and the band all graduated from college in June 1970, the group became professional; Lewie left the band around 1973. Brett Marvin signed to the Robert Stigwood Organisation agency in 1970, and Jona Lewie, as part of the band, appeared on television in Sweden, Denmark, Belgium and the Netherlands, and in 1971 performed in a concert with Son House and supported Eric Clapton's Derek and the Dominos on a UK tour.

Lewie stayed with Brett Marvin until 1973, the band's mainstream hit single being "Seaside Shuffle", another Lewie composition, released under the name Terry Dactyl and the Dinosaurs. The record did little on first release in 1971, but in 1972 a re-release reached number 2 in the UK Singles Chart. A subsequent Lewie-composed Terry Dactyl track, "On a Saturday Night", reached no. 42 in the UK chart in 1973, and a cover version was a hit in Spain. "She Left, I Died" was the third and last Lewie composition he recorded for the Terry Dactyl catalogue in May 1973, just before leaving the band.

=== Solo career ===
Not wanting his name to be the exact same as the famous department store, and also a jazz musician, John Lewis began recording as Jona Lewie in 1974.

After the demise of Terry Dactyl, Lewie continued to write and make records, now as a solo artist for Sonet, between 1974 and 1976 including the titles "Piggy Back Sue" and "The Swan", which were both played by BBC Radio London disc jockey Charlie Gillett, who would regularly feature them on his Honky Tonk radio show. At this time, he also helped form the short-lived band the Jive Bombers that played the established London gig circuit at such venues as the Hope and Anchor, Islington, the Greyhound, the 100 Club and the Marquee Club. The band stayed together for six months and was not able to develop a recording career, despite Ted Caroll's offer of a record deal on his own label Chiswick Records. The band members included Iain "Thumper" Thompson, who went on to help form the successful chart act Darts, the guitarist Martin Stone and drummer Wilgar Campbell. This period, however, did culminate in some further recordings that achieved chart activity for Lewie in Europe as a solo recording artist, with two of his Sonet singles, "Cherry Ring" and "Come Away (Bate O Pe)", leading to solo TV appearances in central and northern Europe.

Despite Lewie's continuing development as a songwriter and recording artist, he did not forget his early roots as a blues and boogie-woogie pianist evidenced by Lewie providing blues piano for albums by American blues singer-guitarists Arthur "Big Boy" Crudup (Roebuck Man released on United Artists) and Juke Boy Bonner (Things Ain't Right on Liberty) in the late 1960s and early 1970s. Also he accepted Bob Hall's invitations to the boogie-woogie piano parties that Hall threw in the seventies before he moved away from London. English boogie-woogie players of the period would often drop in to spend time with him, comparing notes and discussing styles. At one such party, Ian Stewart duetted with Bob Hall along with Lewie himself, all three in emulation of the master American triumvirate popular in the 1940s: Albert Ammons, Meade Lux Lewis and Pete Johnson.

In August 1977, Lewie was in a pub filled with punk rockers when they learned of the death of Elvis Presley. Since Presley was considered a musical figure in the "boring old generation", the room of punks cheered with joy; Jona, who is a long time Elvis fan, immediately broke down, ran back home, and wrote "Elvis Presley Was the First Punk".

Lewie's career continued to rise when he signed to Stiff Records in 1977. In 1980, following appearances on the Stiff package tours, he had a solo hit with the synthpop number "You'll Always Find Me in the Kitchen at Parties" co-written with fellow Brett Marvin member Keef Trouble, which he occasionally performed live with Kirsty MacColl on backing vocals. The song made the British Top 20. His next single, "Big Shot – Momentarily", was a hit in Germany but not in the UK.

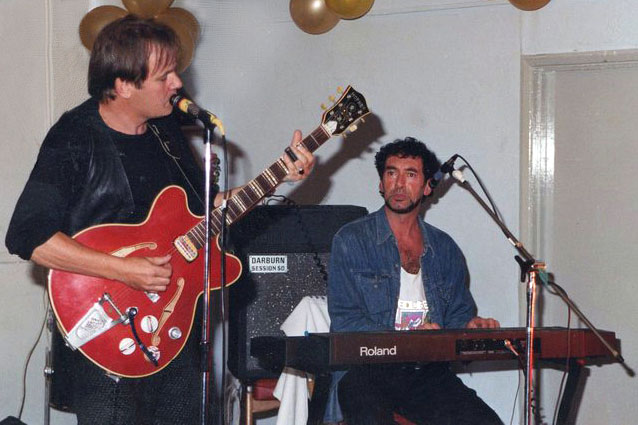
Lewie (right) performing with Keef Trouble in 1996

By the end of 1980, he was back in the British charts with what became his biggest UK hit, "Stop the Cavalry". The song peaked at number three on the UK Singles Chart in December 1980, at one point being kept from number one by two re-issued songs by John Lennon, who had been murdered on 8 December that year, before both artists were kept from number one by St Winifred's School Choir's "There's No One Quite Like Grandma". It has since become a Christmas favourite in the UK.

His subsequent 1981 release, "Louise (We Get It Right)" reached No. 2 in Australia, and achieved chart success in other world territories. His next two singles, "Vous et Moi" and "The Seed That Always Died", both charted in France. Both "Kitchen at Parties" and "Stop the Cavalry" had also been hits in Germany at the times of their original releases in 1980 and 1981 respectively, and remained popular in Germany. In 2010 and 2011, both tracks achieved prominent positions in an all-time German chart that appeared in a high ratings TV show. Lewie performed the two songs on two episodes of The Ultimate Chart Show which was broadcast 2010 and 2011. He also talked on the 'chat' part of the show with the aid of a German interpreter.

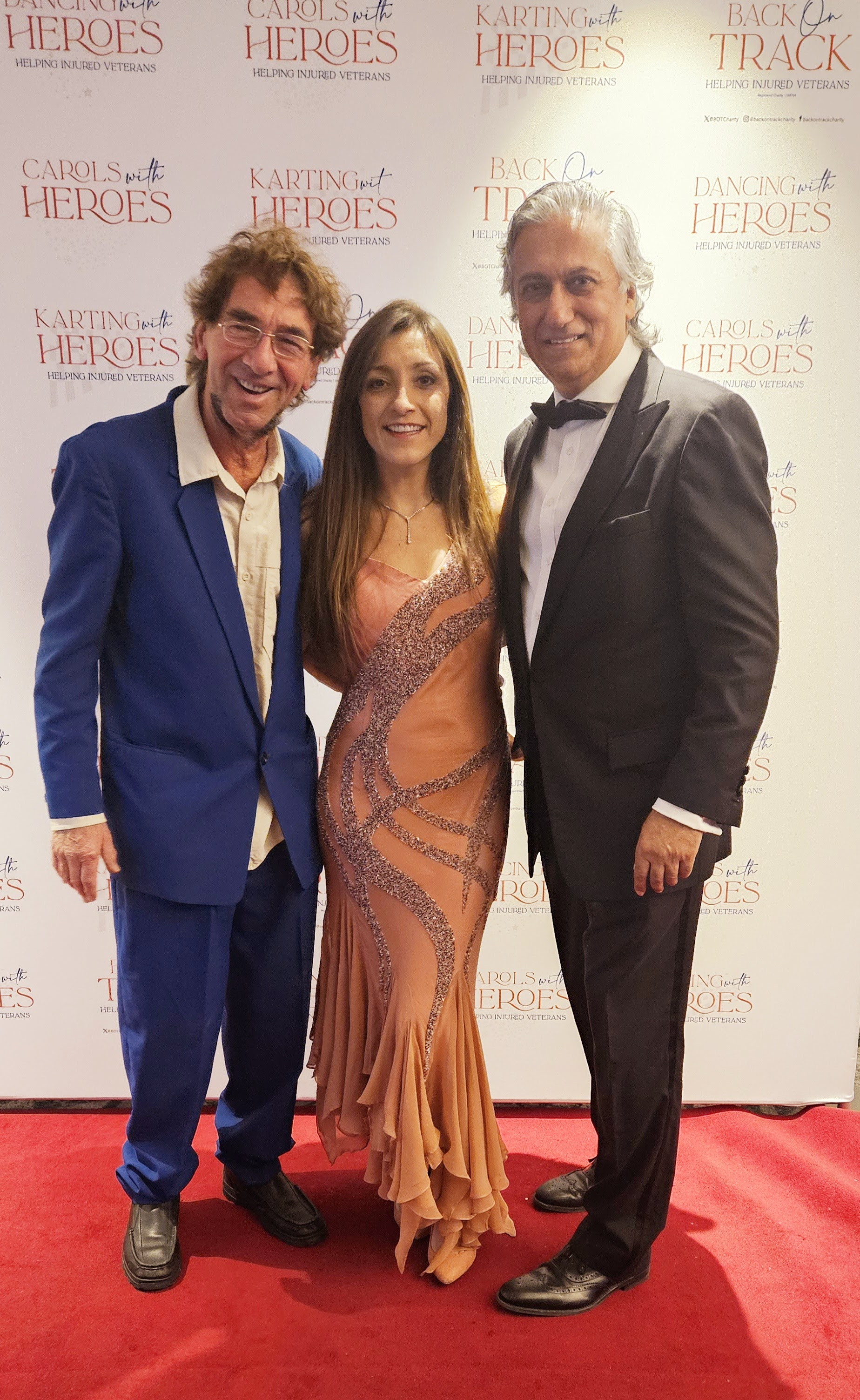
Lewie (left) in 2023

During the 1990s, Lewie appeared with solo public performances on a 60-day UK tour as guest of the Blues Band, playing venues such as theatres and civic centres, while occasionally playing one-off gigs such as that at the Hackney Empire, London and taking part in occasional radio and television broadcasts. In December 2005, he appeared in Channel 4's Bring Back...The Christmas Number One, along with David Essex and Slade. They only fronted, but did not play on, the studio recording session of "I'm Going Home". It failed to secure a recording contract. It was written by ex-Mud star Rob Davis, who also appeared on the show. In 2009, Lewie performed two songs at the London Ukulele Festival. The next year, Lewie joined Captain Sensible and the Glitter Band on their British tour.

== Personal life ==
Lewie was born on 14 March 1947 in Southampton into a Jewish family. His mother was Scottish. He did not know his biological father, but later learned he was a Jewish man who moved to Brooklyn, New York. His grandmother was a classical pianist, who played the piano for young Lewie, who often sang Elvis songs. At eight years old, his step father introduced him to the music of Fats Domino. He lives in Streatham with his wife and child.

== Discography ==
=== Albums ===
- On the Other Hand There's a Fist (Stiff Records, 1978) (re-released in 1980 with a different track listing including the 1980 songs "You'll Always Find Me in the Kitchen at Parties" and " Big Shot... Momentarily")
- Alias Jona Lewie (Sonet, 1979)
- Gatecrasher (re-release of 1979 album Alias Jona Lewie, Sonet, 1979)
- Heart Skips Beat (Stiff Records, 1982)
- Optimistic (New Rose Records, 1993)
- Are You Free Tuesday ? (Jona Lewie Music, 2024)

=== Singles ===
Year	Single	Chart positions									
Year	Single	UK	AUS	AUT	BEL	FRA	GER	NLD	NZL	SWE	SWI
1976	"Cherry Ring"	–	–	–	–	–	–	–	–	–	–
1978	"The Baby, She's on the Street"	–	–	–	–	–	–	–	–	–	–
1978	"Hallelujah Europa" (withdrawn, not released in UK)	–	–	–	–	–	–	–	–	–	–
1979	"God Bless Whoever Made You"	–	–	–	–	–	–	–	–	–	–
1980	"You'll Always Find Me in the Kitchen at Parties"	16	21	5	22	–	23	30	3	7	–
1980	"Big Shot – Momentarily"	–	–	–	–	–	73	–	–	–	–
1980	"Stop the Cavalry" - BPI: Gold	3	2	1	5	1	2	6	3	13	4
1981	"Louise (We Get It Right)"	–	2	14	22	27	30	–	24	–	–
1981	"Shaggy Raggy"	–	–	–	–	–	–	–	–	–	–
1981	"Re-arranging the Deckchairs on the Titanic"	–	–	–	–	–	–	–	–	–	–
1981	"I Think I'll Get My Hair Cut"	–	71	–	–	–	–	–	–	–	–
1983	"Love Detonator"	–	–	–	–	–	–	–	–	–	–
2007	"Stop the Cavalry" (re-issue)	48	–	–	–	–	–	–	–	–	–
2010	"You'll Always Find Me in the Kitchen at Parties" (re-issue)	71	–	–	–	–	–	–	–	–	–

== See also ==
- List of performers on Top of the Pops
- List of Christmas hit singles (UK)
- Be Stiff
