= Zapoppin' =

English alternative and indie folk band

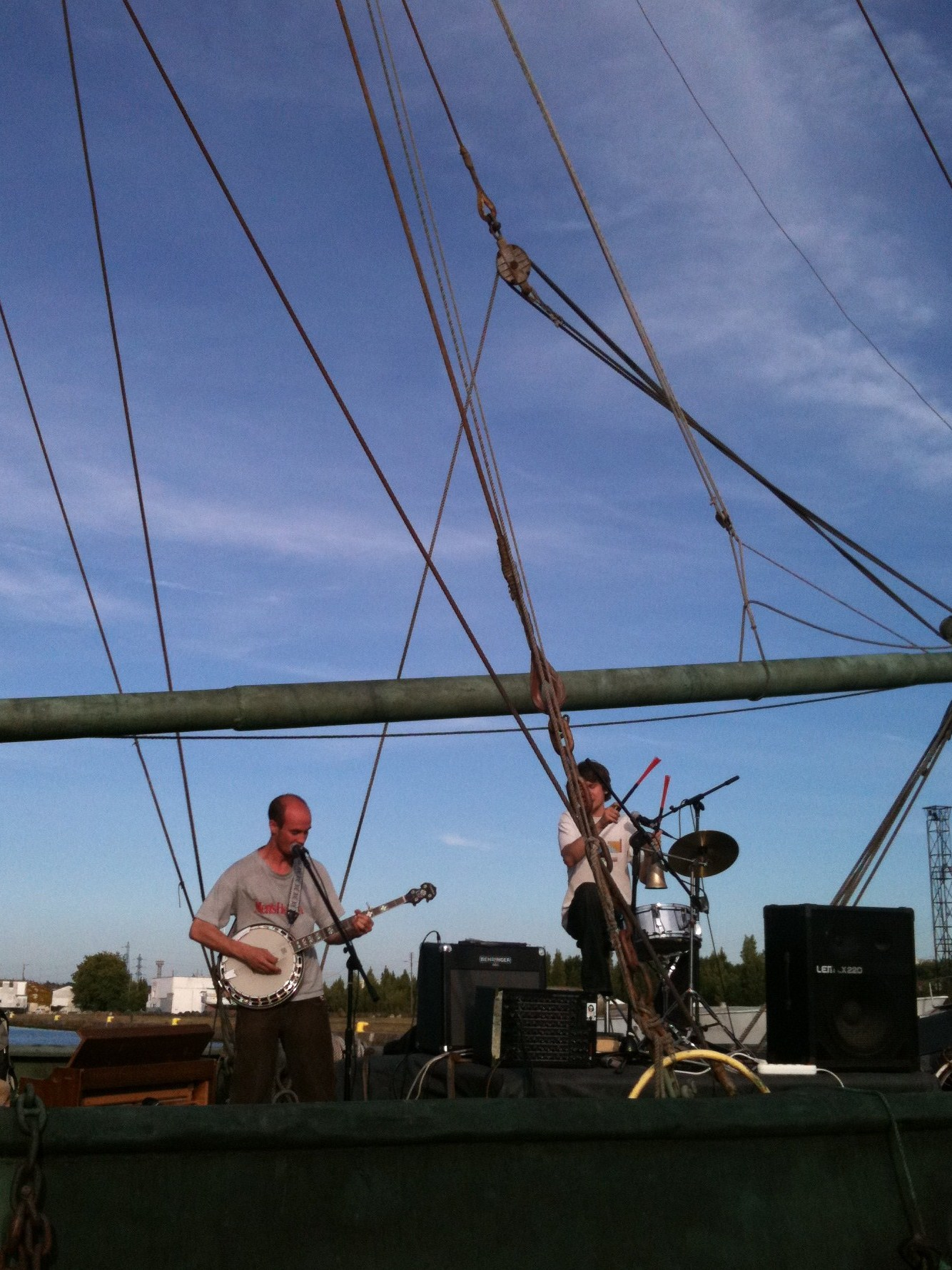
- Zapoppin' live aboard The Jolly in Caen, France. June 2011.

Background information
- Origin: Falmouth, England
- Genres: Alternative, Folk, Skiffle
- Years active: 2007–present
- Labels: Serious Types, Damnsonic, Koept
- Members: Luke Richards; Matthew Collington
- Past members: Thomas G. J. Sharpe; Samuel Brettingham

Zapoppin' are an English alternative band from Falmouth in Cornwall. As of 2016, the group consists of Luke Richards on organ and vocals, and Matthew Collington on drums and vocals.

The band have been noted for their 'black humour and obtuse lyrical themes' by Clash, and were said that they 'could be the face of a new strain of folk once everyone has recovered from their Mumford measles' by 247 Magazine.

== History ==
=== Formation ===
Tom Sharpe and Luke Richards met in 2005 while studying at University College Falmouth. The band formed in January 2007 and played their first official show supporting Alex Neilson's and David Keenan's free jazz duo Tight Meat. The following October Zapoppin' self-released their debut album, Z 1.

=== Samuel Brettingham joins ===
In 2008 Zapoppin' enlisted Samuel Brettingham on the cajón and lagerphone. The following year they recorded and self-released their second album, Parma Violence (the track "Hoisted" was the first by the band to receive radio airplay), as well as The Introducin' Zapoppin' EP to promote themselves on their first European tour across Germany and The Netherlands. One review for the Zapoppin' live show during this period published by Stranger noted the band's 'wake-up-the-dead energy' and having 'enough discords and attitude to fill all the cracks in the walls.'

Antiquarian Party Ballads For Dames, the band's label debut for Serious Types, was released the following October. The 'mutoid music...fierce banjo and demented harmonium' as described by Jam earned the record a place as one of their "Jam Favourites of 2010," while a four-star review from 247 Magazine compared its sounds to 'an excitable Blyth Power had they used banjo and harmonium instead of crunchy guitars.' The track "Oops, you're a racist" received airplay on London-based Resonance FM, most notably as part of their last broadcast of the year, "New Year's Eve: A Natural Selection – the pick of 2010."

Samuel Brettingham left the band shortly after the album's release to sail the Mediterranean sea.

=== Returning as a duo ===
Zapoppin' returned as the duo of Richards (now on 'Z-Kit') and Sharpe (playing harmonium as well as banjo) in 2011. They recorded again for Serious Types with eight tracks appearing across four double a-side singles released (primarily digitally) to accompany a tour in France and Switzerland during June. The singles were later compiled into an eight-track EP (further expanded with extra tracks in March 2012), The First Four Singles. Reviews for the compilation were generally favourable (receiving four stars from 247 Magazine) and often focussed on the band's surreal nature, with Dave Dryden of The Final Skin writing 'If Zapoppin' were an animal, they'd be a featherless emu or a whelk-sized tapir, the kind of previously undiscovered species that finds itself on the front page of New Scientist or the National Geographic.'

In October 2011, Zapoppin' recorded a live session for Resonance FM and announced that their next release would be a collaboration with London-based electronic musician, Jaxson Payne. The Another Pearly Wotnot / Tears split 7-inch EP was released during January 2012 in association with Damnsonic and Koept.

=== 2013 onwards ===
In 2013, Matthew Collington joined Zapoppin' as their principle drummer. They released the Ugly Musick album in November and followed this with St Kreun: Songs of Land and Waterways in April 2016.

Since 2016 the band have performed as a duo of Collington and Richards. They released Live At The Curse to coincide with Cassette Store Day 2017.

In 2018 Luke Richards started a solo side project, Ubiquitous Meh!.

== Instrumentation ==
Aside from the prominent use of the banjo, Zapoppin' have always used lesser-known and home-made instruments including harmoniums, cajóns, lagerphones, The Z-Kit (a homemade stomp-box, snare drum, cymbal and bell) and a vintage Hohner Symphonic 32 electric organ.

== Discography ==
=== Albums ===
- Z 1 (self-released, 2007)
- Parma Violence (self-released, 2009)
- Antiquarian Party Ballads For Dames (Serious Types, 2010)
- The First Four Singles and Other Pearly Wotnots (Serious Types/Damnsonic, 2011/2012)
- Ugly Musick (Damnsonic, 2013)
- St Kreun: Songs of Land and Waterways (Last Shop Recs/Damnsonic, 2016)
- Live At The Curse (Last Shop Recs/Damnsonic, 2017)

=== EPs ===
- Introducin’ Zapoppin’ (self-released, 2009)

=== Singles ===
- "She’s his (from heels to lips)" / "The Cheapest Laugh" (Serious Types, 2011)
- "Pumpin’ Out The BTUs" / "Sweat Out" (Serious Types, 2011)
- "Flay The Night Away" / "Creatine Creature" (Serious Types, 2011)
- "Dark As Dogs Guts" / "In The Mud" (Serious Types, 2011)

=== Split releases and collaborations ===
- Another Pearly Wotnot / Tears (w/ Jaxson Payne, Koept/Damnsonic, 2012)

=== Compilation appearances ===
- Serious Types #1 (Serious Types, 2011) – ‘Oh, Martello’
