= Seaside Shuffle =

Single by Terry Dactyl and the Dinosaurs
- B-side: "Ball and Chain"
- Released: 1971
- Genre: Folk rock
- Length: 2:41
- Label: UK
- Songwriter: John Lewis

Terry Dactyl and the Dinosaurs singles chronology
"On a Saturday Night" (1972)	"Seaside Shuffle" (1971)	"She Left, I Died" (1973)

"Seaside Shuffle" is a song and single by British group Terry Dactyl and the Dinosaurs written by Jona Lewie under his real name John Lewis. The song was licensed for released on Jonathan King's UK Records, and was included in the Brett Marvin and the Thunderbolts's album Alias Terry Dactyl.

First released in 1971, it was re-released in 1972 and entered the UK chart in July, reaching number 2 in August and staying for 12 weeks in the chart. The song was the first single released on UK Records to become a hit.

== Charts ==
Chart (1972)	Peak position
Australia (Kent Music Report)	20
Germany (GfK)	22
Netherlands (Single Top 100)	15
Ireland (IRMA)	13
UK Singles (Official Charts)	2
