= Terry Dactyl and the Dinosaurs =

English novelty band (1972–1977)

- Origin: England
- Genres: Pop, novelty
- Years active: 1972–1977
- Labels: UK, Sonet
- Spinoffs: The Jive Bombers
- Spinoff of: Brett Marvin and the Thunderbolts

Terry Dactyl and the Dinosaurs were an English novelty band that issued a few recordings in the early 1970s. The band was an alias adopted by Brett Marvin and the Thunderbolts but signed to a different record label.

Terry Dactyl and the Dinosaurs was created to promote the hit single "Seaside Shuffle". The name was not a reference to any particular band member, but was simply a pun on the name of the Jurassic flying reptile pterodactyl. Notable band members were Jona Lewie (composer/vocals/accordion) and Keef Trouble (percussion).

== Recordings ==
Terry Dactyl and the Dinosaurs released three singles in 1972 and 1973: "Seaside Shuffle" (1972), "On a Saturday Night" and "She Left; I Died" (both 1973). "Seaside Shuffle and its B-side "Ball and Chain" were both written by John Lewis (aka Jona Lewie).

In 1972, the band released "Seaside Shuffle" with the marketing and distribution aid of Jonathan King's UK Records label. The song reached number two in the UK Singles Chart. "On a Saturday Night" did not achieve the same popularity, just making the Top 50. The final single, "She Left; I Died" did not chart. The band did not have another top 10 chart single, consigning it to perennial one-hit wonder status. Subsequently, band members returned to performing as Brett Marvin and the Thunderbolts, except for Jona Lewie, who pursued a solo career.

In 1977 the single "Come Away" was released by 'Terry Dactyl and the Dinosaurs with Jona Lewie'.

== Single discography ==
Year	Title	Label	Peak positions					Album
Year	Title	Label	UK	AUS	GER	IRE	NLD	Album
1972	"Seaside Shuffle" b/w "Ball and Chain"	UK Records	2	20	22	13	15	Alias Terry Dactyl - Brett Marvin & the Thunderbolts
1973	On a Saturday Night" b/w "Going Round the World"	UK Records	45	—	45	—	—	
1973	"She Left I Died" b/w "Too Self Centred"	UK Records	—	—	—	—	—	
1977	"Come Away" (with Jona Lewie) b/w "Cherry Ring"	Sonet Records	—	—	—	—	26	
"—" denotes releases that did not chart or not released in the territory
