= Ugly stick =

Canadian folk percussion instrument

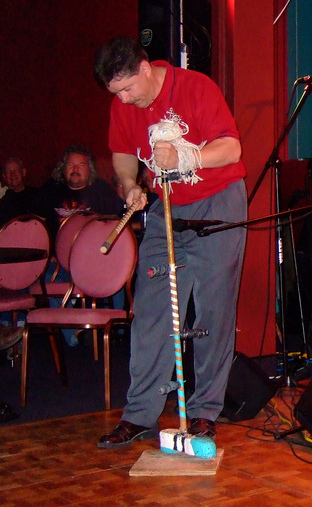
An ugly stick being played

The ugly stick is a Newfoundland musical instrument fashioned out of household and tool shed items, typically a mop handle with bottle caps, tin cans, small bells and other noise makers. The instrument is played with a drum stick or notched stick and has a distinctive sound.

== History ==
In outports and remote villages, social gatherings such as concerts, "times," mummering, and kitchen parties were an important part of the rural culture. The principal melody instruments were accordions and fiddles. Starting in the 20th century, rhythmic accompaniment came from the ugly stick. The instrument's early history is vague. However, there are clear precursors:

Similar percussion instruments were known in Europe as far back as the 16th century. The French Foreign Legion marching band includes a similar instrument called a “chapeau chinois” - literally "Chinese hat” - while British Army marching bands used a stick covered with bells called a “Jingling Johnny” into the 19th century. Today in England, folk musicians still play a version of the ugly stick, calling it a “mendoza” or a “monkey stick.” In Australia, it is known as a “lagerphone,” after the beer or lager bottle caps used in its construction; there are similar aboriginal instruments made using shells instead of bottle caps.

While often described as a "traditional" Newfoundland instrument, the ugly stick likely only became familiar to Newfoundland and Labrador audiences in the early 1980s. The Newfoundland and Labrador Folk Festival Guide for 1987 featured an ugly stick player on the cover. The guide noted the instrument was "Not available in any music store" and included the following explanation:

Who is the fellow on your front cover and what in the .... is that he's playing? We thought you would never ask. His name is Winston Stanley, a resident of the Goulds, near St. John's. The object he's hitting with the shorter stick is just about the most unique folk instrument you'll see or hear played on any folk festival stage anywhere this summer. It's called the "ugly stick" which consists of a mop with bottle caps and felt tins attached to the stick and topped off with a 48 ounce Avon apple juice can. When the short stick is applied in the proper manner, this unique folk instrument can resemble the sound of an entire set of drums and blends in very well with folk music.

Winston Stanley may have been one of the first local musicians to popularize the ugly stick, making his own in the late 1970s, while Buddy Wasisname and the Other Fellers acquired their first one in Charlottetown, Prince Edward Island, in 1983. As late as 1988, an article about a local folk club deemed it necessary to describe what an ugly stick was, stating:

You may also find an authentic ugly stick. It's masterfully constructed with beer stoppers, duct tape, a tobacco can, and a few pieces of wood. It just is..."

By the 1990s, references to ugly sticks start to appear in local publications. The instrument was likely given a boost by its use by the Folk of the Sea Choir, a fisher choir that formed after the cod moratorium in 1992. At the Choir's first concert in 1994, it was introduced by the Dunne Brothers, Rick and Doug, from Renews, accompanied by Gerard Hamilton. Doug explained his instrument to the audience:

A lot of you know what it is. It's an ugly stick. And you can see why. [laughter] Anyway, basically what it is is an old mop, or a new one if you're playing at the Arts and Culture Centre [prolonged laughter and clapping.] And it's an old juice can with some black tape over it. A handful of three and a half inch nails. Some felt tins, beer stoppers, wherever they came from [laughter], and that's about it, and it's supposed to make some music.

Also during the 1990s, ugly sticks became widely available in local music and gift stores, crafted by makers such as Grenfell Letto. Originally from the Labrador Straits, Letto started making mini ugly sticks that tourists could take home more readily than the larger version. In 2012, he was reported as making around 150 large ugly sticks and between 200 and 300 of his mini ugly sticks per year for the tourist market.

The name ugly stick was not universal even into the 2000s. In 2007, folklorists Maureen Power and Evelyn Osborne documented the playing of a "silly stick" by Melvin Combden, Seldom-Come-By, Fogo Island.

In the early 2000s, communities started to organize ugly stick making workshops. One early community-organized workshop was held in Trepassey, as part of a Come Home Year celebration. Yvonne Fontaine was the then Coordinator for the Southern Avalon Development Association:

“The ugly stick has been played at kitchen parties for many years as a traditional Newfoundland musical instrument,” says Fontaine. “I thought, why not have people learn to make an ugly stick and then learn to play it. I felt it would help to preserve this part of our culture and heritage.”

The Mummers Festival, established in 2009, regularly includes ugly stick making workshops, often featuring Trepassey-based maker Wayne Cave. Founding festival director Ryan Davis noted in 2014,

For mummering especially, the ugly stick is the perfect accompaniment. Unlike say a guitar which is somewhat fragile, the ugly stick is a sturdy instrument that can withstand a hard night of winter weather and partying. Percussion and hard stepping go so well together. It also doubles as cane for those having trouble staying on their feet!

The Festival expanded its workshop program outside of St. John's, including a workshop in Portugal Cove-St. Philips where the sticks were made mostly by families with young children. A workshop on making ugly sticks was included as part of The International Council for Traditional Music World Conference, held in St. John's in 2011, and workshops have been organized independently in communities such as Summerside and Bauline, which held an "Ugly Stick Clinic" in 2018.

Expats and travelling musicians have spread the use of ugly sticks across Canada and internationally. Traditions continued to evolve in the 2000s: a 2000 wedding in Pembroke, Ontario with a "Nova Scotia born Newfoundlander" bride involved an ugly stick:

One of the musical instruments that we are all looking forward to which will be arriving from Newfoundland is the Ugly Stick. A home-made device that is bound to produce a definite beat of its own, the ugly stick is made of a broom handle with a boot on one end and beer caps tied along the handle which creates a unique sound. No jig or reel is worth its salt unless the Ugly Stick is bouncing on the floor. And of course, no wedding would be complete without an ugly stick - and so we wait with great anticipation.

In 2015, the Terre-Neuve Newfoundlanders & Friends Association organized an ugly stick contest during the Newfie Days Festival in Lunenburg, Nova Scotia. In 2016, a children's book by Joshua Goudie on ugly sticks was published to emphasize Newfoundland and Labrador's musical culture.

== Construction ==
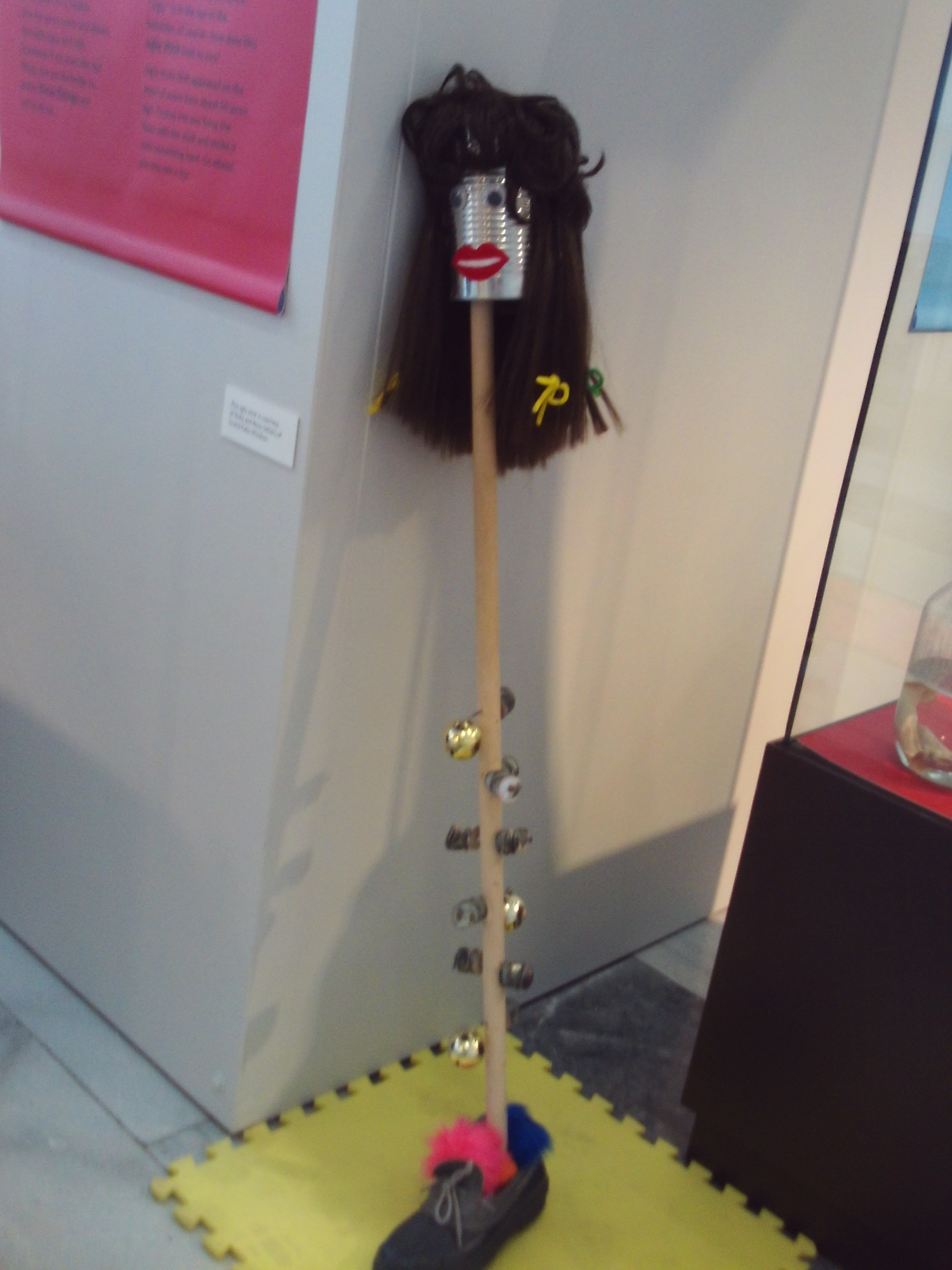
Example of an ugly stick

The instrument's main body is a mop or broom handle, sometimes cut to a desired length. Often, an old rubber boot is attached to the bottom and a tin can acting as a cymbal is attached at the very top. At strategic intervals along the length of the shaft, nails or screws affixed with bottle caps, felt tins, and other noisemakers are nailed into the shaft. The instrument is then decorated with items of colour and fluff to the artist's taste to create an instrument unique to the maker.

Art educator Jason Sellers noted in 2008:

The stick must be chosen wisely. Remember: your creation can be simple or complicated, but either way it will be eccentric. To acquire enough bottle caps for one ugly stick, you’ll need to preplan at least two long weekends before your first big gig. A couple dozen will do, but the more bling you collect, the louder and uglier your stick will be. Go out back to the tool shed (just like Pop would do) and dig out all that jingles and clangs. If you can stick a nail through it, and it makes noise, it will work great on an ugly stick.

The instrument has been described as a testament "to the creativity of Newfoundlanders to make something inventive out of what would normally be thrown into the garbage."

== Playing ==
The ugly stick is held in one hand part of the way up the shaft and the musician would hold a drum stick in the other. The instrument would be lifted and dropped on the floor in a rhythmic fashion while the musician would strike the attachments and cymbal to embellish the sound.

== See also ==
- Boomba
- Folk music
- List of Newfoundland songs
- List of people of Newfoundland and Labrador
- Monkey stick
- Music of Newfoundland and Labrador
