= Anatoliko =

Anatoliko (Greek: Ανατολικό, "eastern place") may refer to several places in Greece:

- Anatoliko, Eordaia
- Anatoliko, Kozani
- Anatoliko, Thessaloniki
- former name of Aitoliko
