= Ahmet Hulki Saral =

Turkish Army general and military historian

Ahmet Hulki Saral 1340-P. 7
- Born: 1905; Kozana (Kozani), Ottoman Empire
- Died: 1982 (aged 76–77); Ankara, Turkey
- Military career
- Allegiance: Turkey
- Service years: 1924-1960
- Rank: Tümgeneral
- Commands: chief of staff at the Dardanelles Fortified Area Command, 42nd Infantry Regiment, 4th Infantry Division, Istanbul Military Museum, Military History Department at the Turkish General Staff
- Other work: Military historian

Ahmet Hulki Saral (1905–1982) was a Turkish Army general and a military historian.

He was born 1905 in Sofoular village (present day Kapnochori) of Kozana (present day Kozani, Greece). Before the Balkan Wars, Kozana was a town in the Serfiçe Sanjak of the Monastir Vilayet within the Ottoman Empire. His father was Hodja Ismail Hakki Efendi, a military imam at the 97th Regiment of the Ottoman Army.

Ahmet Hulki Saral graduated from the Turkish Military Academy in 1924 as an infantry officer. In 1933, he completed his education as a staff Second Lieutenant and served in various military units as a staff officer. Between 1948 and 1950, he was chief of staff at the Dardanelles Fortified Area Command. Then, he commanded the 42nd Infantry Regiment and later, promoted to the rank of a general, the 4th Infantry Division in Gallipoli.

In 1957, he was tasked with the reorganization of the Military Museum in Istanbul and the renowned historical Ottoman military band "Mehter". During the years 1958–1960, he served as the chief of the Turkish Military History Department at the Turkish General Staff. He retired in 1960.

He married Hacer Cenan Saral from Fethiye. The couple had two sons, İsmail Tosun Saral (1941) and Osman Yavuz Saral (1947–1982).

Ahmet Hulki Saral died 1982 in Ankara.

== Bibliography ==
- Ermeni Meselesi (The Armenian Problem)
- Türk İstiklal Harbi Güney Cephesi (The South Front During the Turkish War of Independence)
- Vatan nasıl kurtarıldı: Nur Dağları (Amanoslar), Toroslar, Adana, Maraş, Gaziantep ve Urfa'da yapılan kuvayı milliye savaşları (How Motherland has been saved: Kuva-yi Milliye Wars in the Nur Mountains, Taurus Mountains, Adana, Maraş, Gaziantep and Urfa)
- I. ve II. dünya harblerinde Alman ve Rus sevk ve idaresi hakkında bir etüt (A study on German and Russian organization during World War I and World War II)
