= Komnina =

Komnina may refer to the following places in Greece:

- Komnina, Kozani, a village in the Kozani regional unit, part of the municipality of Vermio
- Komnina, Thessaloniki, a village in the Thessaloniki regional unit, part of the municipality of Stavroupoli
- Komnina, Xanthi, a settlement in the Xanthi regional unit
