= Vermio =

Vermio may refer to:

- Vermio, Kozani, a small town in the regional unit of Kozani, Greece
- the Vermio Mountains, in Greece
