= Brazilian Marine Pipes, Drum and Bugle Corps =

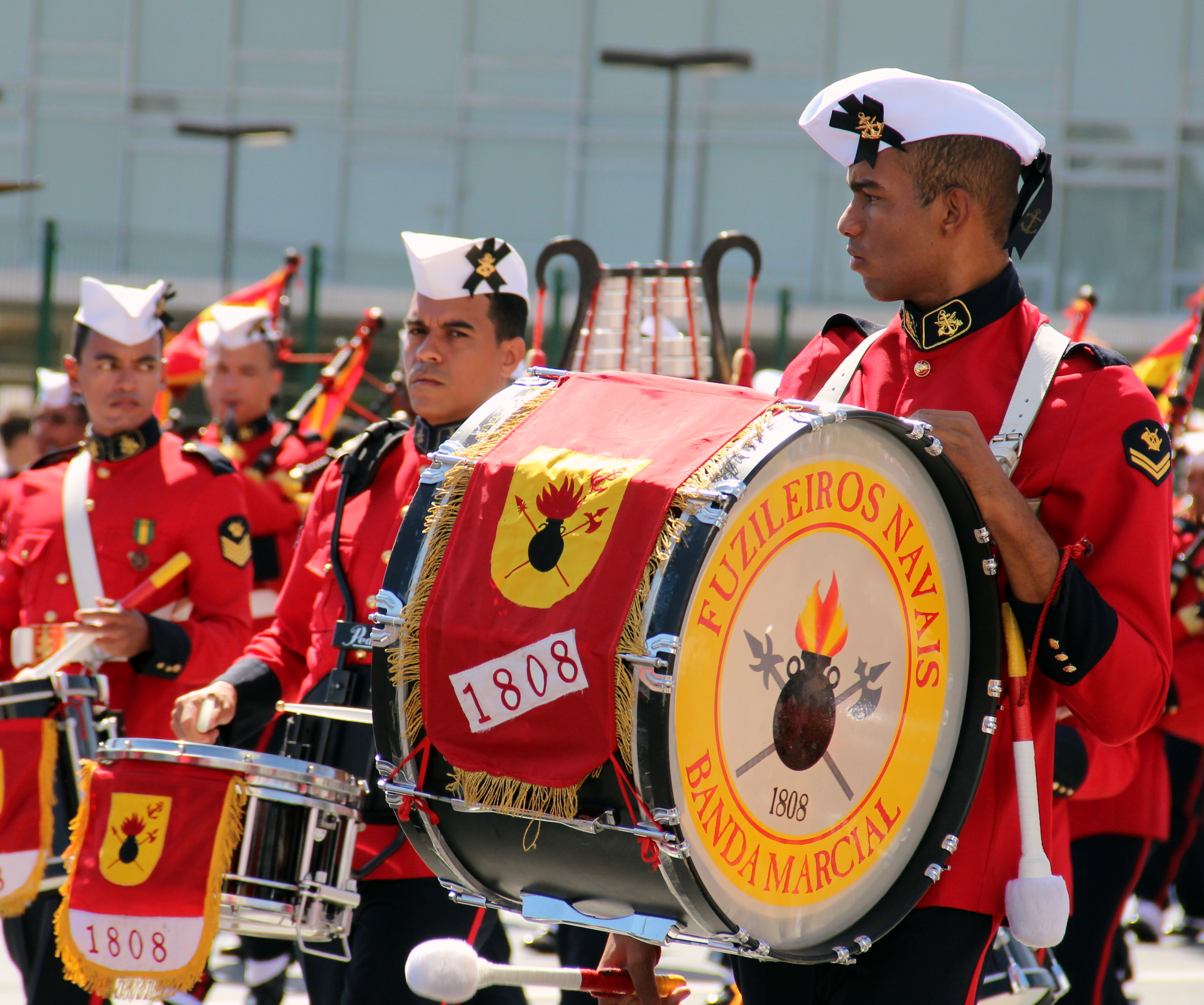

The Brazilian Marine Pipes, Drum and Bugle Corps (Banda Marcial dos Fuzileiros Navais) is the only field music (corps of drums, drum and bugle corps and pipe band) formation in service in the Brazilian Marine Corps and within the wider Brazilian Navy, and one of a few active formations today in service in the Brazilian Armed Forces. Formed in 1822 on the basis of the field music formations of the present day Portuguese Marine Corps stationed in Brazil (when it was part of the United Kingdom of Portugal, Brazil and the Algarves and then as part of the Royal Brigade of the Navy (Brigada Real da Marinha) stationed in the colony), it is also the oldest in South America.

== Brief history and present day role ==
The BMPDC, as a component of the Marine Corps and the Navy, has been the primary field music formation of the corps since independence, and plays alongside the Central Band of the Brazilian Marine Corps in all ceremonies of national importance. Its first appearance in Independence Day parades in the former capital city of Rio de Janeiro in modern times was in 1922, and has been in all parades held in the current capital, Brasilia, since 1960. It has been based in the Fortaleza de São José Marine Barracks, Ilha das Cobras, Rio de Janeiro, and honors the field drummers and buglers who fought in every major Marine Corps combat operation since 1808.

In the Independence Day parade of 7 September 1946, the then Drum, Fife and Bugle Corps had just been reorganized in the manner of the United States Marine Drum and Bugle Corps, in response to and in honor of the Brazilian participation in the Second World War as a 123-strong field music formation, during that parade it was then made up of the Corps Bandmaster, the deputy bandmaster, the drum major, 8 bass drums, 8 single tenor drums, 8 cymbals, 8 snare drums, 16 field snare drums, 16 fifes, 24 1st bugles, 24 2nd bugles and 16 tenor bugles. In 1951, it became the Pipes, Drum and Bugle Corps when 16 Great Highland bagpipes, a gift to the Corps by bagpipers of the British Armed Forces, arrived in Brazil and was given to the Corps by the crew of the USS St. Louis (CL-49), which under the name Almirante Tamandaré, was commissioned as the flagship of the Navy. Another relic of the past lies in its Turkish crescent, a symbol and instrument of European origin used in the old bands of the Army and Navy in the 19th century. The following year, the BMPDC was deployed to the United Kingdom to celebrate the Coronation of Elizabeth II and the bagpipers played for the first time, after receiving bagpipe training in the Army School of Bagpipe Music and Highland Drumming based in Edinburgh by British Army instructors. The Corps had also performed on behalf of the Navy in France, Paraguay and Portugal, in the 2005 Bastille Day military parade and in the 2011 Royal Edinburgh Military Tattoo. In 1956, the drum corps appeared on film for the first time when it performed in the movie Fuzileiro do Amor.

Recent national performances include the 2007 Pan-American Games, 2011 Military World Games and the 2016 Summer Olympics. Today, aside from activities for the Marine Corps and the entire Brazilian Navy, the BMPDC tours the whole of Brazil, performing in many cities and in the annual Marine Corps Evening Parade yearly in Rio de Janeiro. Led today by the Corps Bandmaster Cmdr Ennes Fernando da Silva and the Deputy Bandmaster WO Cesário José Barbosa Neto, the now 150-strong field music formation draws on its more than 200 years of service and continues to be a part of Brazil's military heritage. In recent years, the bugles which served the band for more than half a century are now replaced by trumpets, cornets, mellophones and baritone bugles, and there has been a multiple tenor drum and two glockenspiels as well in the drumline, which now has shoulder mounted snare drums instead of the old slinged side drums, in addition the second more senior NCO of the formation serves as the Corps Drum Major, following the format of the British Army and the Royal Marines, after many years of absence. It shares the duties of being the flagship premier ensemble of the Navy with the Central Band of the Marine Corps.

== Musical repertoire ==
As a military marching band, the Pipes, Drum and Bugle Corps exclusively plays traditional marches adapted for the brass, fife and the bagpipe, in addition to contemporary works and Brazilian pop and folk tunes. Among many other marches, its primary repertoire includes the following:

- Cisne Branco
- Commander Narciso March
- Living in Beulah Land
- Tiro de Guerra
- Suricate I
- March no.10

== See also ==
- Brazilian Navy
- Brazilian Marine Corps
