= Masacalla =

Type of idiophone

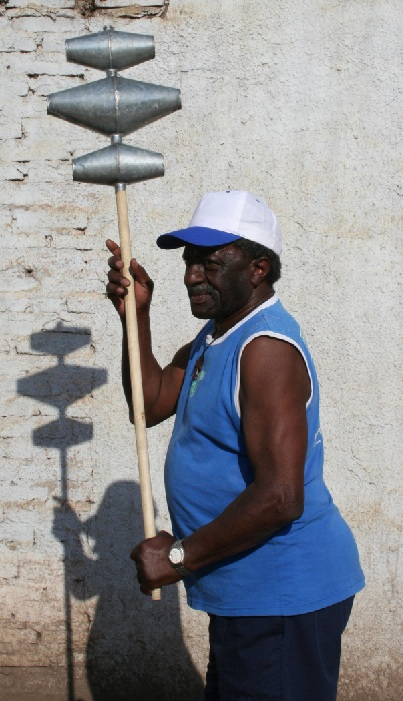

The masacalla (also known as mazacalla, masacaya or mazacaya) is a percussion instrument, a type of idiophone, used in Latin America. It is made up of two or more metal cones atop a wooden handle, filled with seeds or small pebbles, which produce a sound when shaken. It is particularly associated with candombe music, and is used in Argentina, Brazil and Cuba, among others.

== See also ==
- Turkish crescent
