= Turkish crescent =

Percussion instrument

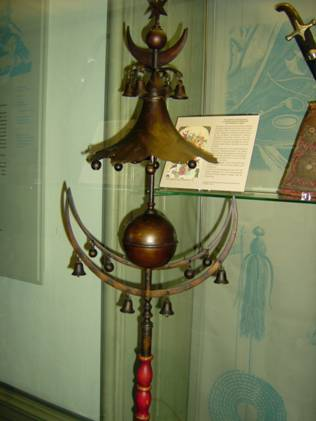
- Turkish crescent in a German museum.
- Hornbostel–Sachs classification: 111.242.222

A Turkish crescent, also called Turkish jingle or a Jingling Johnny (a smaller version is called a Çevgen; Turkish: Çağana; German: Schellenbaum; French: Chapeau chinois or Pavillon chinois), is a percussion instrument traditionally used by military bands internationally. In some contexts it also serves as a battle trophy or object of veneration.

== Description ==
The instrument, usually 2 to 2.5 m (6 ft 7 in to 8 ft 2 in) long, consists of an upright wooden pole topped with a conical brass ornament and having crescent shaped crosspieces, also of brass. Numerous bells are attached to the crosspieces and elsewhere on the instrument. Often two horsetail plumes of different colors are suspended from one of the crescents; occasionally they are red-tipped, symbolic of the battlefield. There is no standard configuration for the instrument, and of the many preserved in museums, hardly two are alike.

The instrument is held vertically and when played is either shaken up and down or twisted. Sometimes there is a geared crank mechanism for rotating it.

Today the instrument is prominent in the marching bands of the German Bundeswehr, the French Foreign Legion, the Russian Armed Forces, the Armed Forces of Chile, the Armed Forces of Bolivia, the Swedish Armed Forces and in Ottoman military bands. Some folk music features similar instruments based on a wooden staff with jingling attachments. A notable folk example is the Australian "lagerphone", made by nailing crown-seal bottle-caps, from beer bottles, onto a wooden broomstick handle, and used to provide a percussive beat for a folk song or bush dance.

During its existence, the Soviet Union produced variant forms of the instrument for military bands, with red artificial plumes and the red star finial.

== Non-musical aspects ==
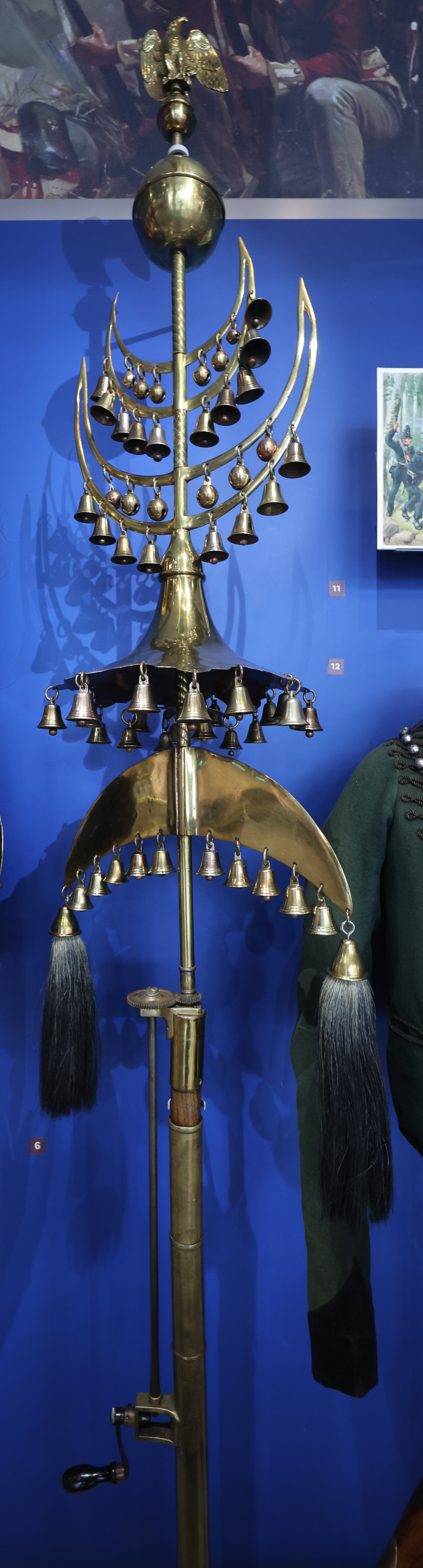
The Turkish crescent captured by the 88th Regiment of Foot

Turkish crescents had symbolic value for the military units that used them. The 88th Regiment of Foot (Connaught Rangers) famously captured one at the Battle of Salamanca in 1812. It became an object of pride and veneration at the regiment's ceremonial parades.

In the early 20th century, Turkish crescents were used in processions honoring important dignitaries. They were skillfully twirled by dignified performers, much as a mace or baton might be today, by drum majors. This aspect survives today in the use of Turkish crescents as mostly symbolic objects in military marching bands. This can be clearly seen in the videos in the External links section at the end of this article.

== History ==
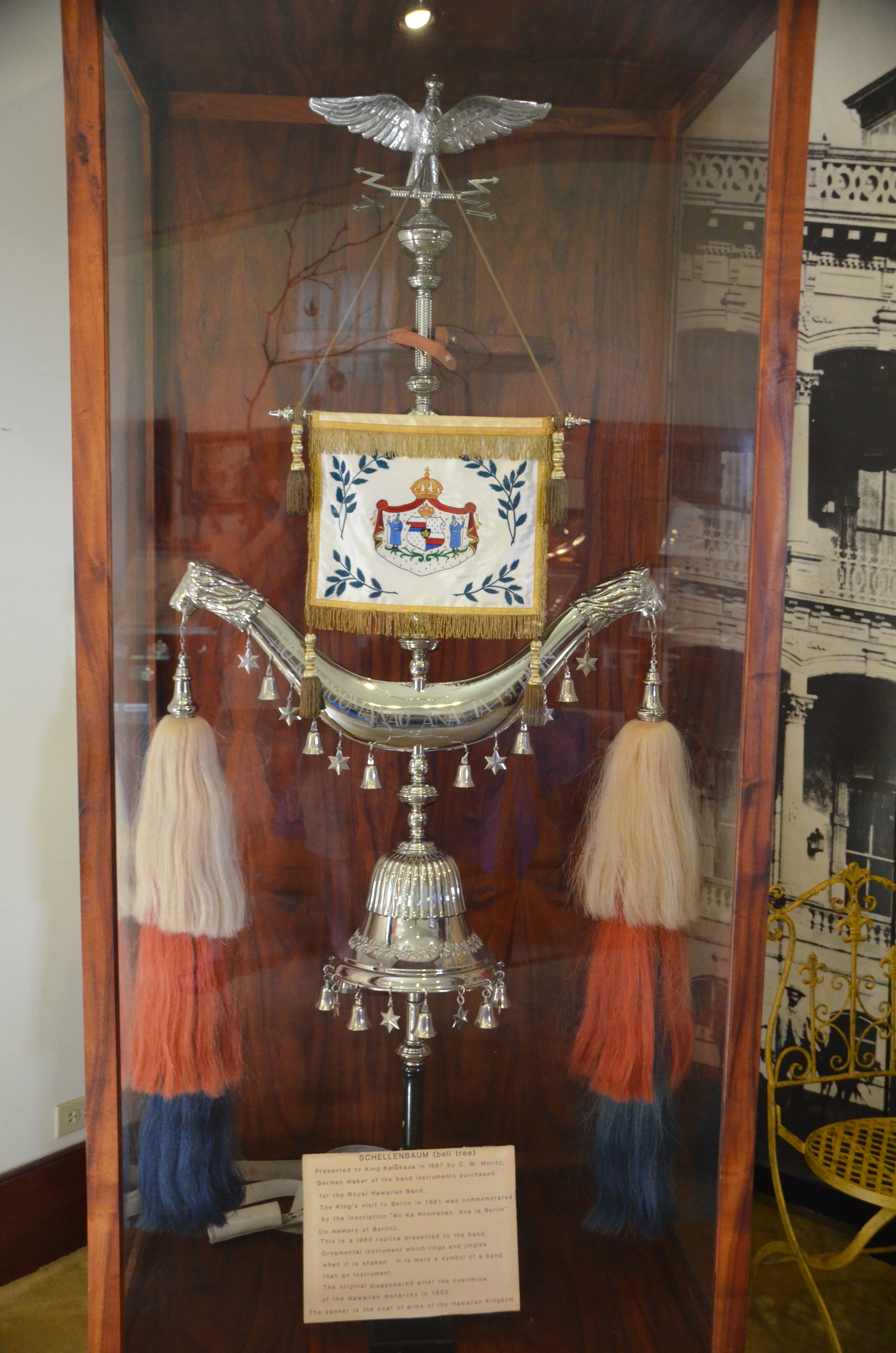
Replica of the Turkish crescent presented to King David Kalākaua on the occasion of his visit to Berlin

The instrument possibly has antecedents in Central Asian tengrist staffs. Similar instruments occur in ancient Chinese music, perhaps diffused from the same Central Asian (Turkic) sources.

Europeans knew of it in the 16th century. In the 18th century, it was part of the Turkish Janissary bands that were the source of much interest in Europe, and in the 19th century, it was widely used in European military bands. It was abandoned by the British in the mid-19th century but survives today, in an altered form, in Germany and in the Netherlands, plus in two military bands in France (the French Foreign Legion and the 1st Spahi Regiment). It is also found in the military bands of the Russian Federation, Ukraine, Belarus, Azerbaijan, Kazakhstan, Chile, Peru, Bolivia and Brazil (examples are in the Brazilian Marine Pipes, Drum and Bugle Corps and the Band of the 1st Guard Cavalry Regiment "Independence Dragoons"). Its presence in the bands of Chile, Brazil and Bolivia is due to the Prussian military influences which arrived in these countries during the late 19th to early 20th centuries.

Its heyday in Europe was from the mid-18th to mid-19th century, when it was commonly played by elaborately dressed black Africans, who made all manner of contortions while playing. Some of these gestures survive today, in the stick twirling by bass and tenor drummers. An aspect of the elaborate costumes survives in the leopard skin apron worn by bass drummers in British military bands; however the use of the "Jingling Johnny" was discontinued in the British Army in 1837.

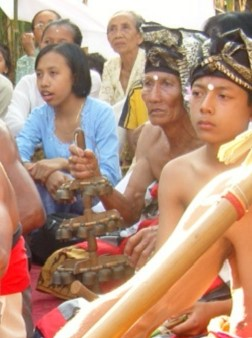
Gentorag, a bell tree from Bali

In 1881, the German Emperor William I presented a Turkish crescent to King David Kalākaua on the occasion of the King's visit to Berlin during his trip around the world bearing the inscription "no ka hoomanao ana ia Berlin" (to commemorate Berlin), which was then used by the Royal Hawaiian Band.

In the mid-19th century this instrument was replaced in most bands by the glockenspiel, which was carried similarly but could be played musically.

=== Argentina ===
Known as the "Chinesco", the instrument was used by Afro-Argentinians in the 19th century. Descriptions of the instrument describe the masacalla, an ethnic instrument. A painting by Martin Boneo and a news clipping from 1899 show an instrument held on a long pole, with horsetails, and either a pointed top like a Chinese hat, or a crescent.

=== Java and Bali ===
The instrument has also been known in Java under the names genta (Hindu-Javanese), klinting, byong or Kembang delima (pomegranate blossom), and in Bali as gentorag. The Javanese instruments lack the crescent or hat, but have "a central wooden spindle" with the bells suspended at different levels on crosses of wood or metal. Bells can also be suspended on wheels stacked above each other, largest on the bottom to tallest on the top. The wheel is mounted to that its rim is not up and down like a car rim, but horizontal to the ground.

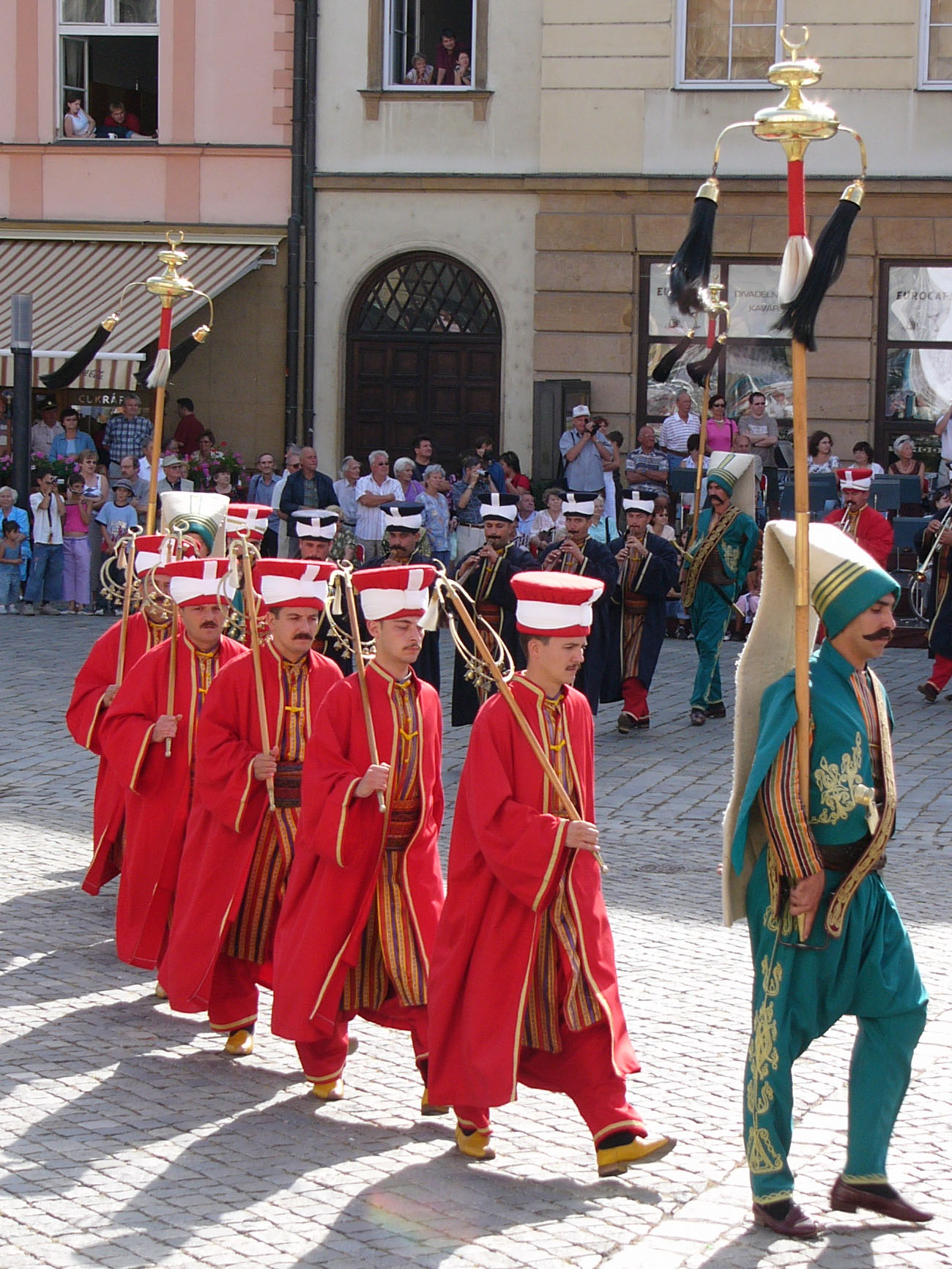
Cevgen player in an Ottoman military band

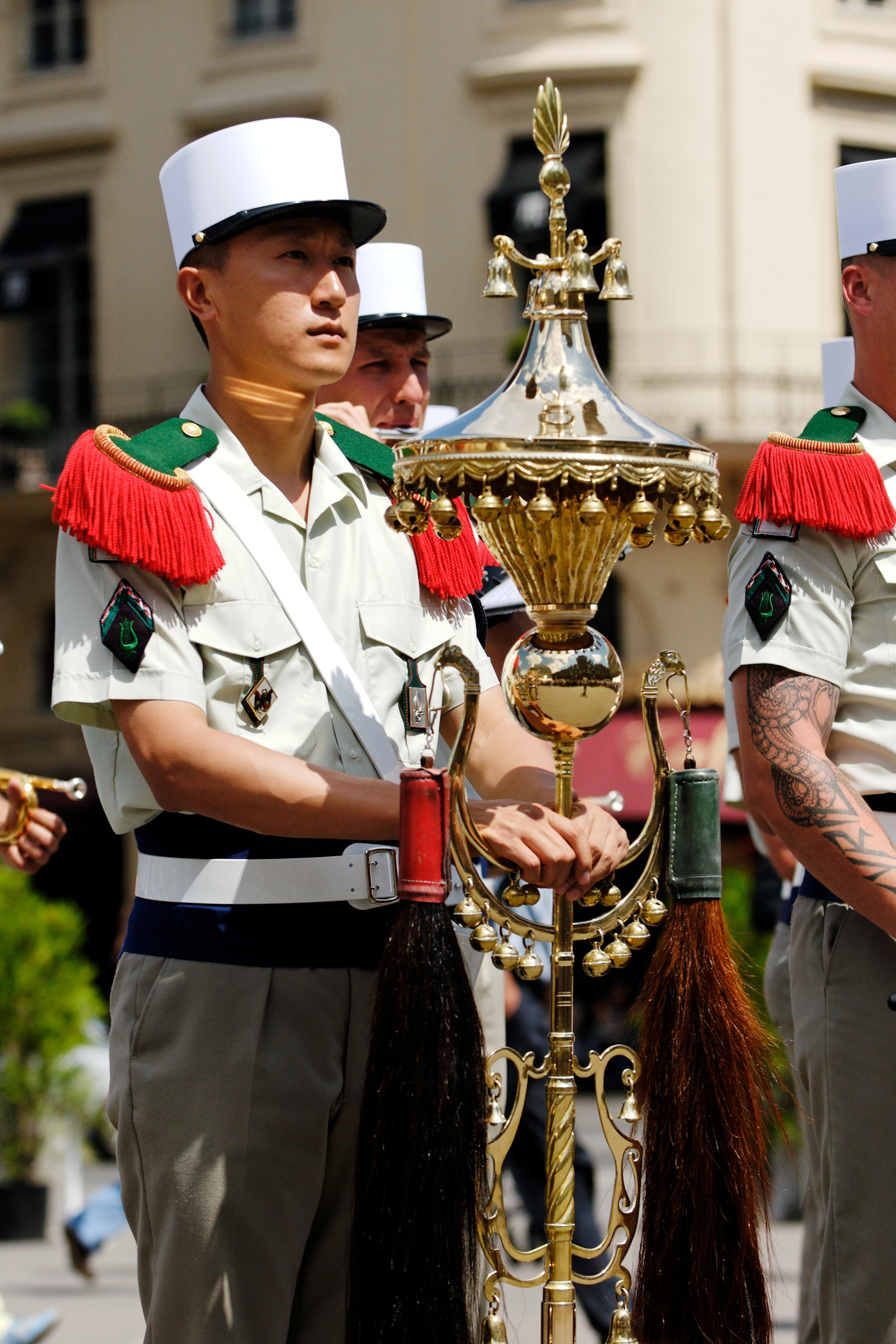
Chapeau chinois of the French Foreign Legion.

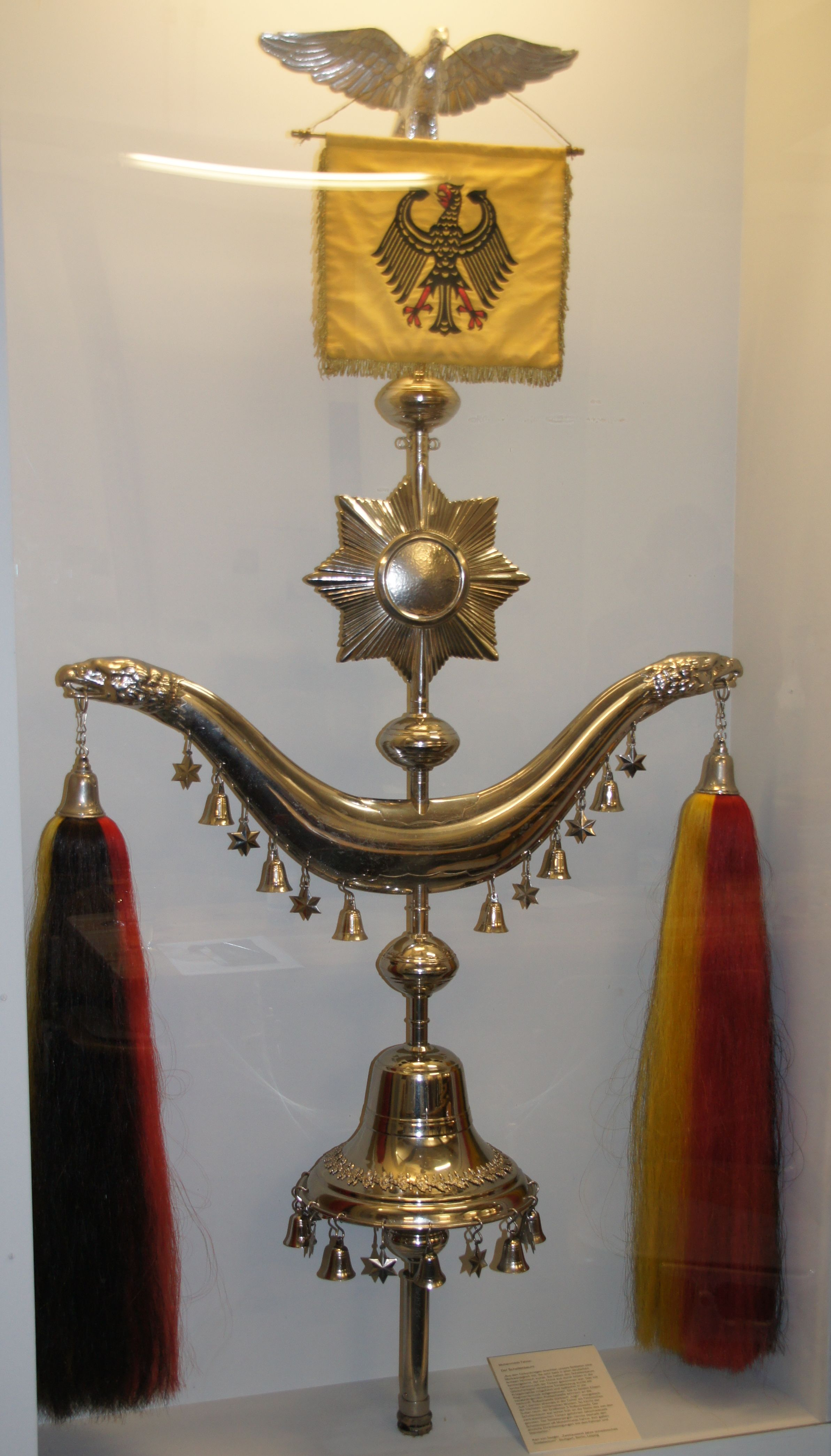
Schellenbaum of the German Bundeswehr

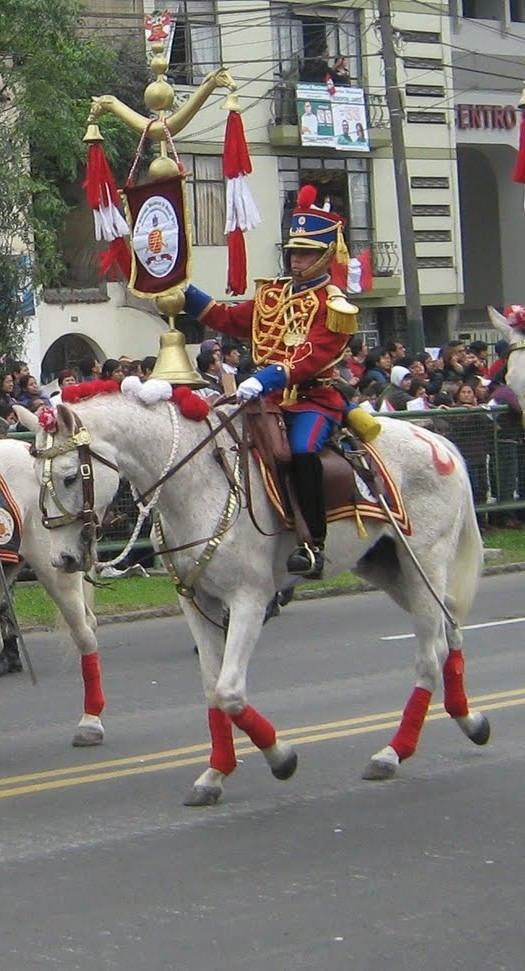
An officer of the Peruvian 1st Cavalry Regiment "Glorious Hussars of Junín" carrying a Turkish crescent

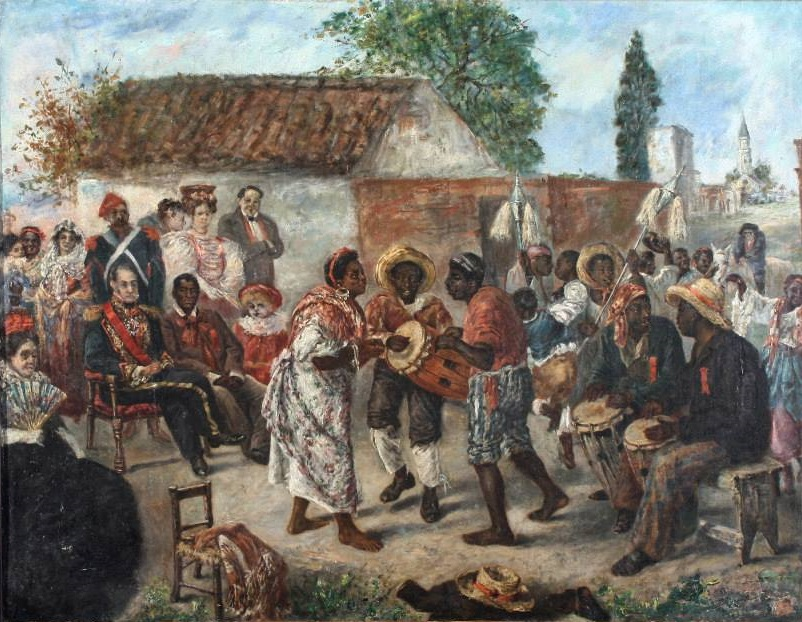
Argentina, depiction of early 19th century. A masacalla, used by Afro-Argentines, has two ponytails and a pointed tip (like a Chinese hat).

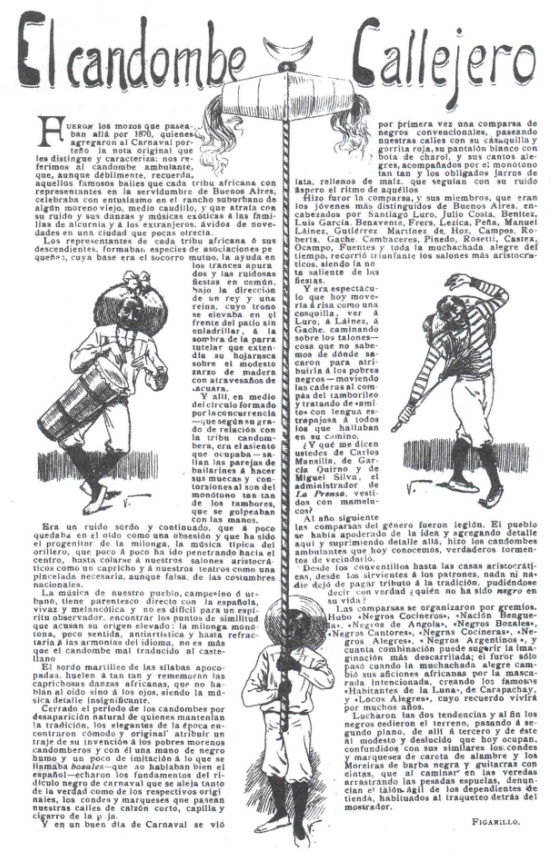
Argentina, 1899. A masacalla used by Afro-Argentines has two horsetails and a crescent, both also used by the Turkish crescent.

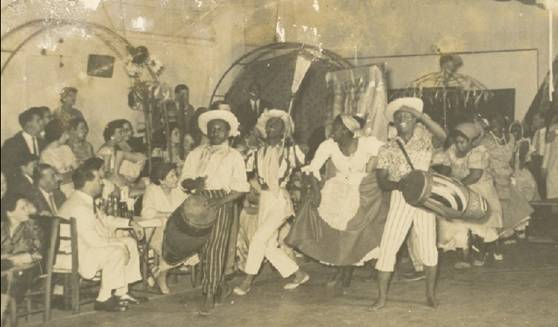
Argentina, ca. 1965. A chinesco is seen in the upper right corner, at the bottom of this photo.

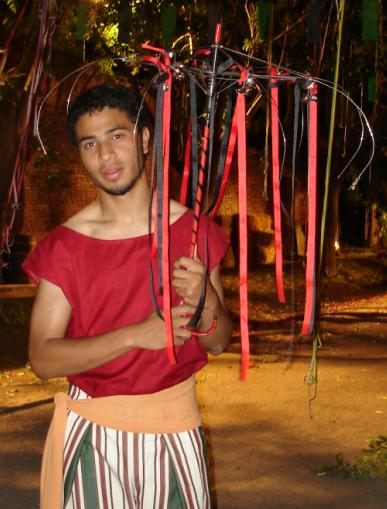
Argentina, 2008. Cristian Damián Fernández, member of the Comparsa Negros Argentinos of the Misibamba Association hold a movie prop.

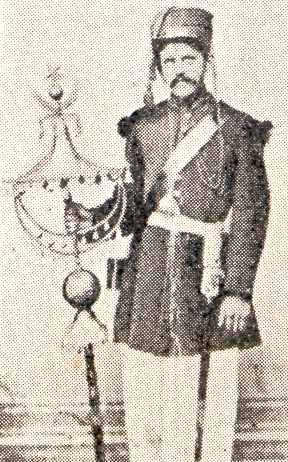
Brazil. Bell tree or Árvore de Campainhas, 1868. The instrument came to Brazil through Portugal.

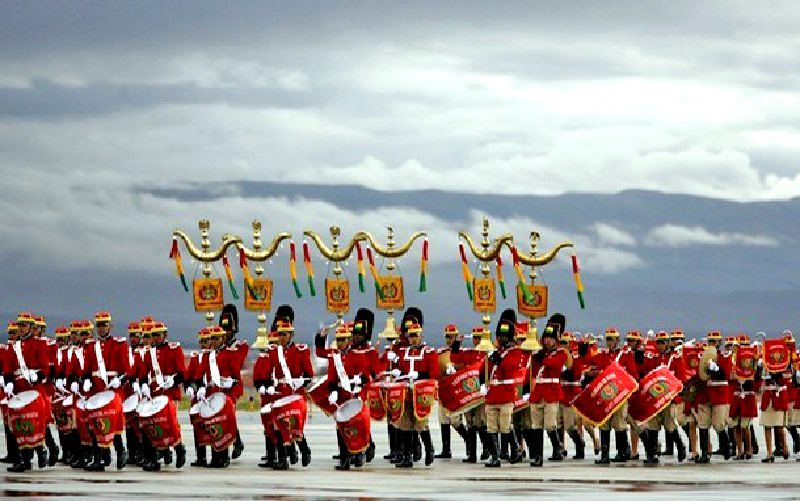
Bolivia, 2013.

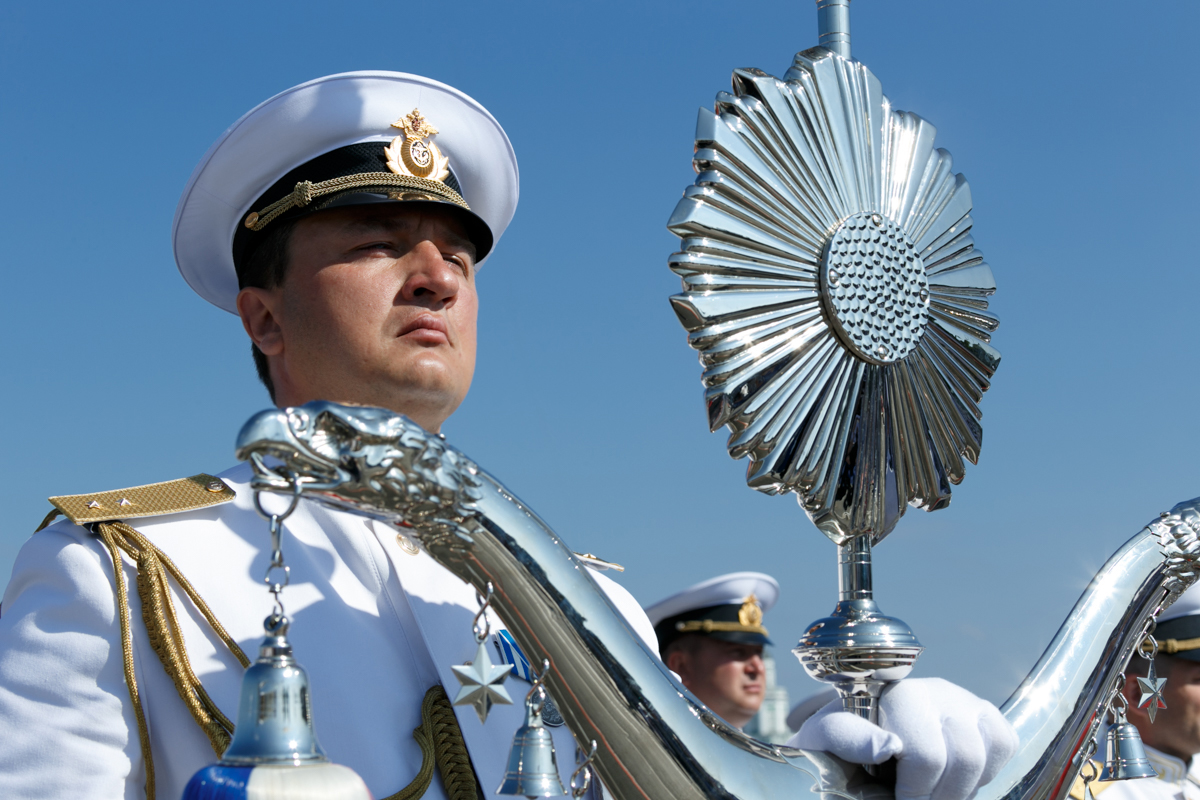
Russia, 2018.

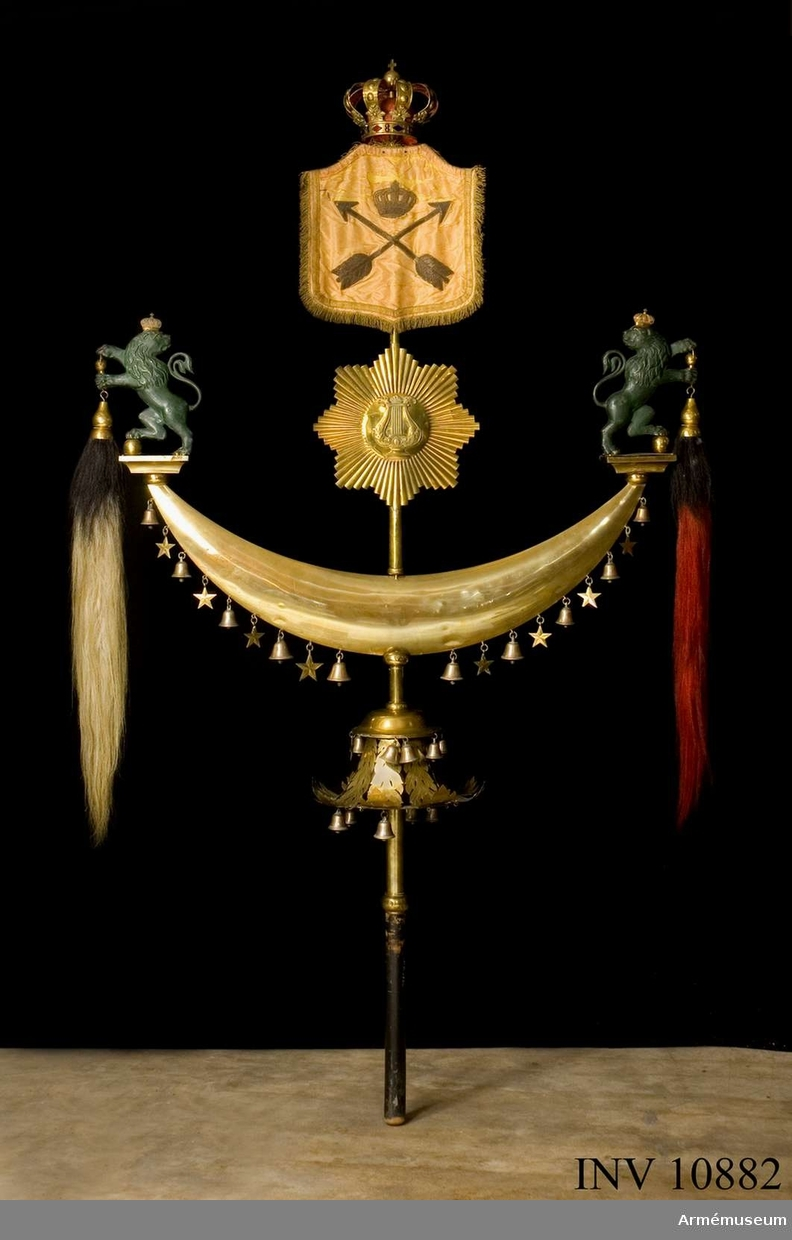
Sweden.

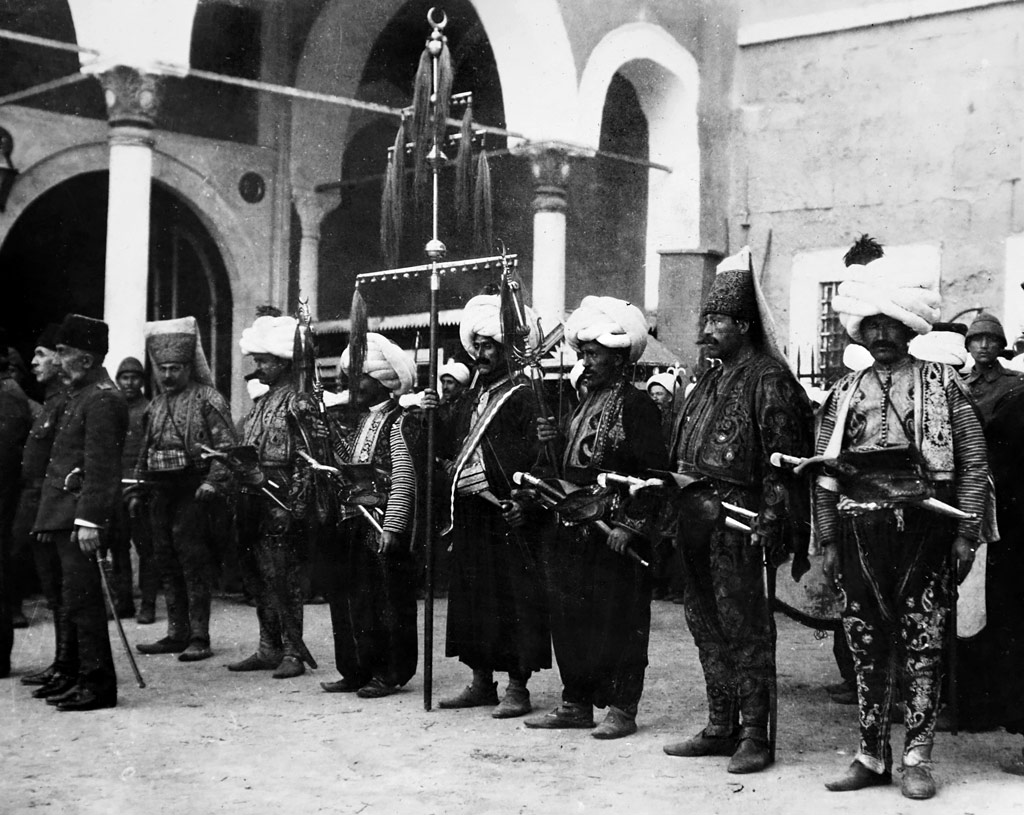
Istanbul, 1917.

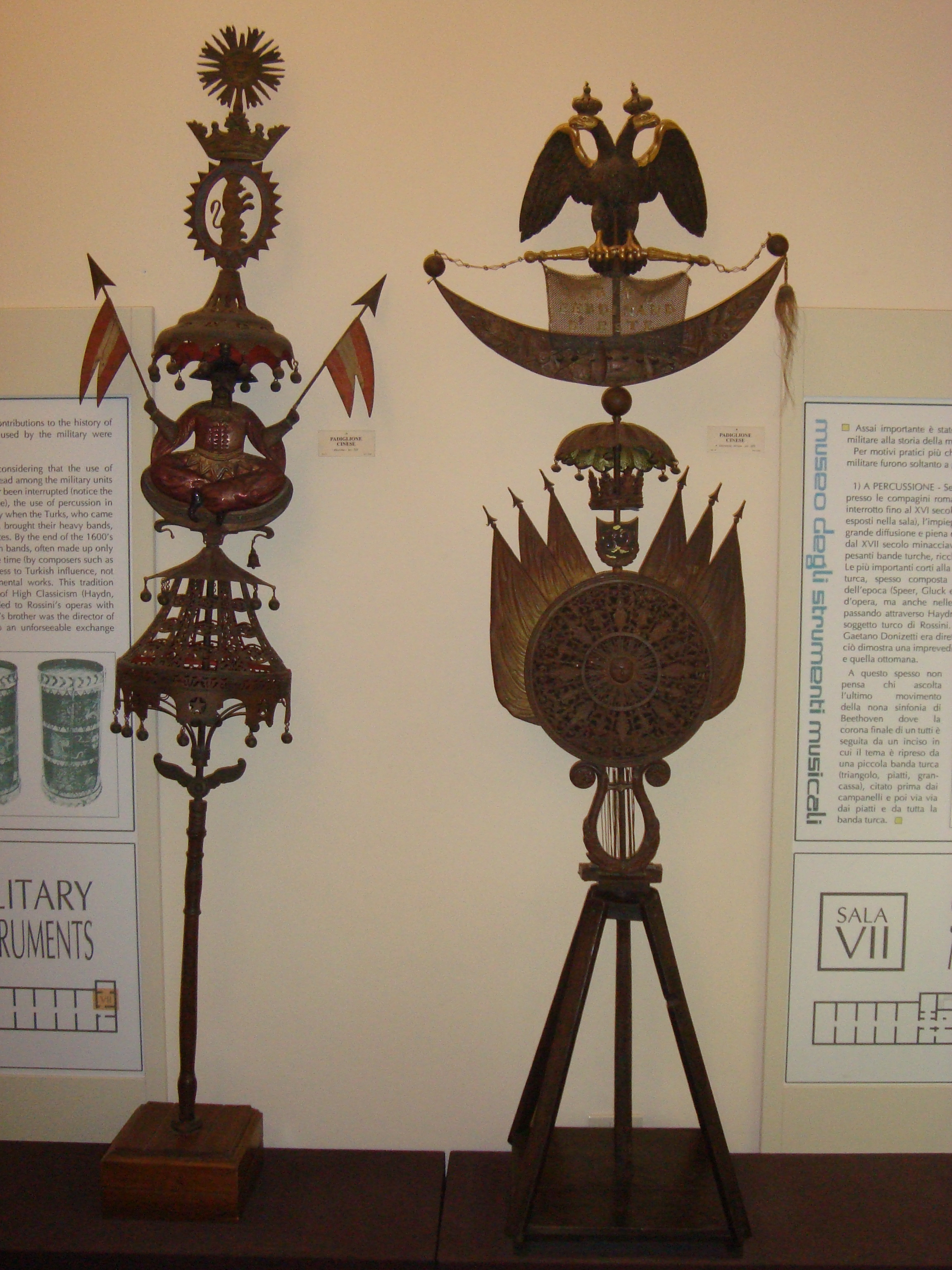
Italy.

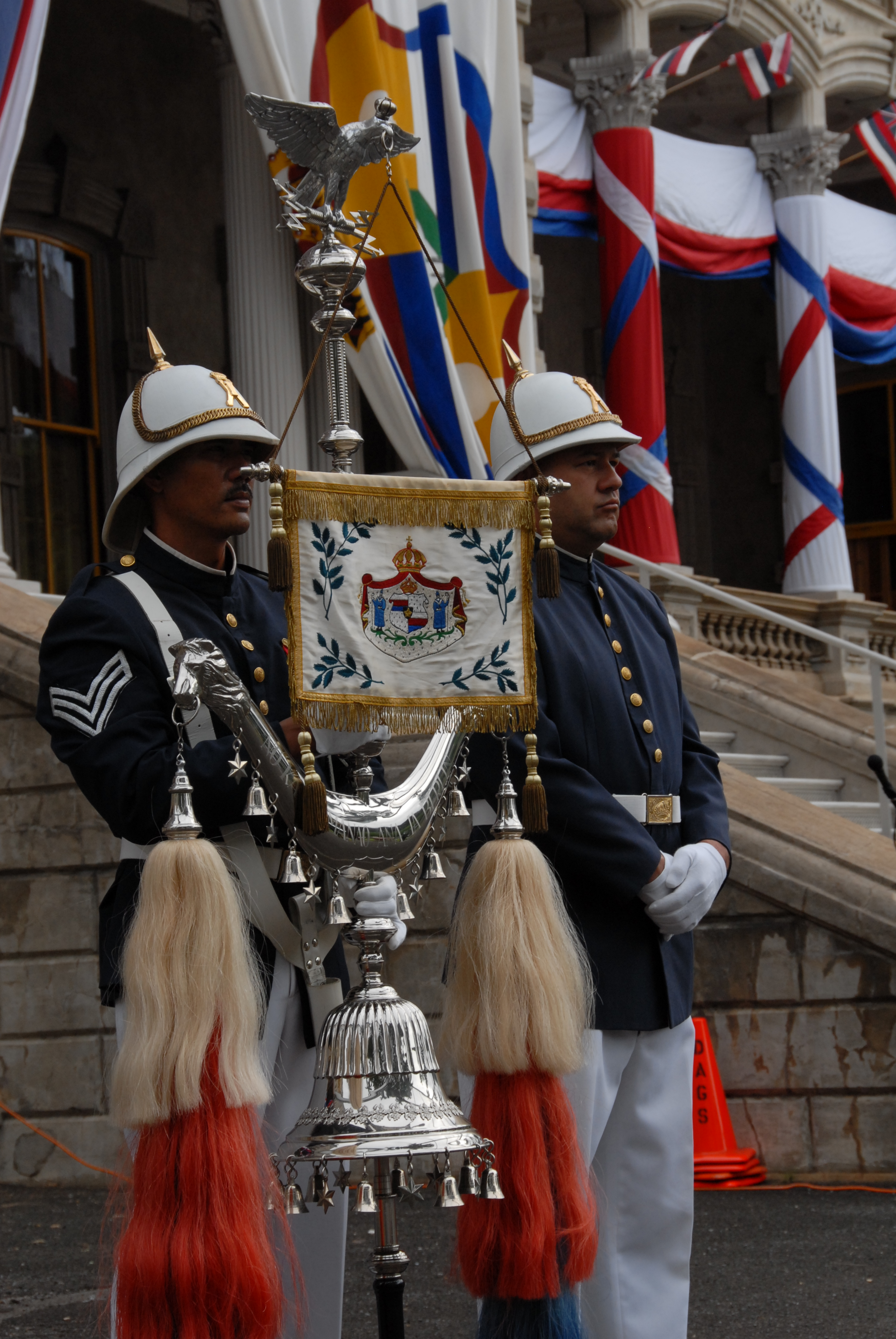
Hawaii, Royal Guards.

== Use in specific musical works ==
- The Turkish crescent figures prominently in the Marche pour la Cérémonie des Turcs, part of Jean-Baptiste Lully's music for Molière's comédie-ballet Le Bourgeois gentilhomme (1670).
- The composer Wolfgang Amadeus Mozart used it in his German singspiel Die Entführung aus dem Serail (1782).
- It was used by the composer Joseph Haydn in his Symphony No. 100 (1794).
- Beethoven is said to have made use of the Jingling Johnny or Turkish crescent in the finale to his Ninth Symphony, though it is not specified in the score.
- Hector Berlioz used it in his massive piece for military wind band with optional choir and organ Grande symphonie funèbre et triomphale (1840). His "dream ensemble" of 467 instrumentalists included four pavillons chinois among its 53 percussion instruments. He said about the instrument: "The Pavillon Chinois, with its numerous little bells, serves to give brilliancy to lively pieces, and pompous marches in military music. It can only shake its sonorous locks, at somewhat lengthened intervals; that is to say, about twice in a bar, in a movement of moderate time".
- John Philip Sousa's Nobles of the Mystic Shrine (1923) also called for the use of the Turkish crescent.
- Gareth Gilkeson of the Rend Collective folk rock band can be seen playing a Turkish crescent in the video for the band's song "Build Your Kingdom Here" (2013).

== See also ==
- Aquila (Roman)
- Khakkhara
- Monkey stick
- Masacalla
- Pogo cello
- Signifer
- Sistrum
- Tug/Tugh (Bunchuk)
- Ugly stick

== Sources ==
- Chappell, Mike. Wellington's Peninsula Regiments. Osprey Publishing, 2003.
