= Anatoliko, Eordaia =

Anatoliko Ανατολικό
- Community
- Location within Greece
- Coordinates: 40°32.65′N 21°44.9′E
- Country: Greece
- Administrative region: West Macedonia
- Regional unit: Kozani
- Municipality: Eordaia
- Municipal unit: Vermio
- Elevation: 630 m (2,070 ft)

Population (2021)
  - Community: 732
- Time zone: UTC+2 (EET)
  - Summer (DST): UTC+3 (EEST)
- Postal code: 502 00
- Area code: +30-2463
- Vehicle registration: ΚΖ

Anatoliko (Greek: Ανατολικό) is a village and a community of the Eordaia municipality. Before the 2011 local government reform it was part of the municipality of Vermio, of which it was a municipal district. The 2021 census recorded 732 inhabitants in the village.
