= Komnina, Kozani =

Town in Kozani, Macedonia, Greece

Komnina Κομνηνά
- Community
- Location within Greece
- Coordinates: 40°35′30″N 21°46′30″E
- Country: Greece
- Administrative region: Western Macedonia
- Regional unit: Kozani
- Municipality: Eordaia
- Municipal unit: Vermio

Population (2021)
  - Community: 517
- Time zone: UTC+2 (EET)
  - Summer (DST): UTC+3 (EEST)

Komnina (Greek: Κομνηνά) is a town in the Kozani regional unit, West Macedonia, Greece. It was the seat of the municipality of Vermio. As of 2021, it had a population of 517 permanent residents. The town's altitude is 688 meters (2260 feet) above sea level.

In the square of the village exists a splendid park with the Monument of the Fallen and the Municipal School.

The vast majority of the population is Pontian. The predominant language of the area is the Pontian language, a dialect of ancient Greek that was spoken in Pontus. Between the 1950s and 1990s about half of the population emigrated abroad, mostly to Germany, Australia, and the United States.

The name Komnina refers to the residents, who are considered descendants of Emperor Komninos of Trapezounta (Trabzon). Previously, Komnina was referred to as Paleohori in the Byzantine era, before it was destroyed after the conquest of the region by the Ottoman Turks. During the Ottoman rule, Komnina was known as Utsena or Üçane, from the Turkish words üç(three) and ane(mother).

== Archeological sites ==
In the top of the mountain Mavro Pouli is a small cave, called the Crypt of Kara-Ali'. Traces of the walls of two fortresses and settlements exist in the vicinity of Komninos. The first is the hill DELTA and the second is Ovon (Pontian for egg). Their existence is testified to by objects such as shells of vessels, copper coins, the base of a pillar, various marbles from buildings, two rings made of glass, a small cupbearer from Byzantine times and a marble bas-relief, in which is pictured a feminine form with tunic, helmet, spear and shield.
