= Ottoman military band =

Oldest variety of military marching bands in the world

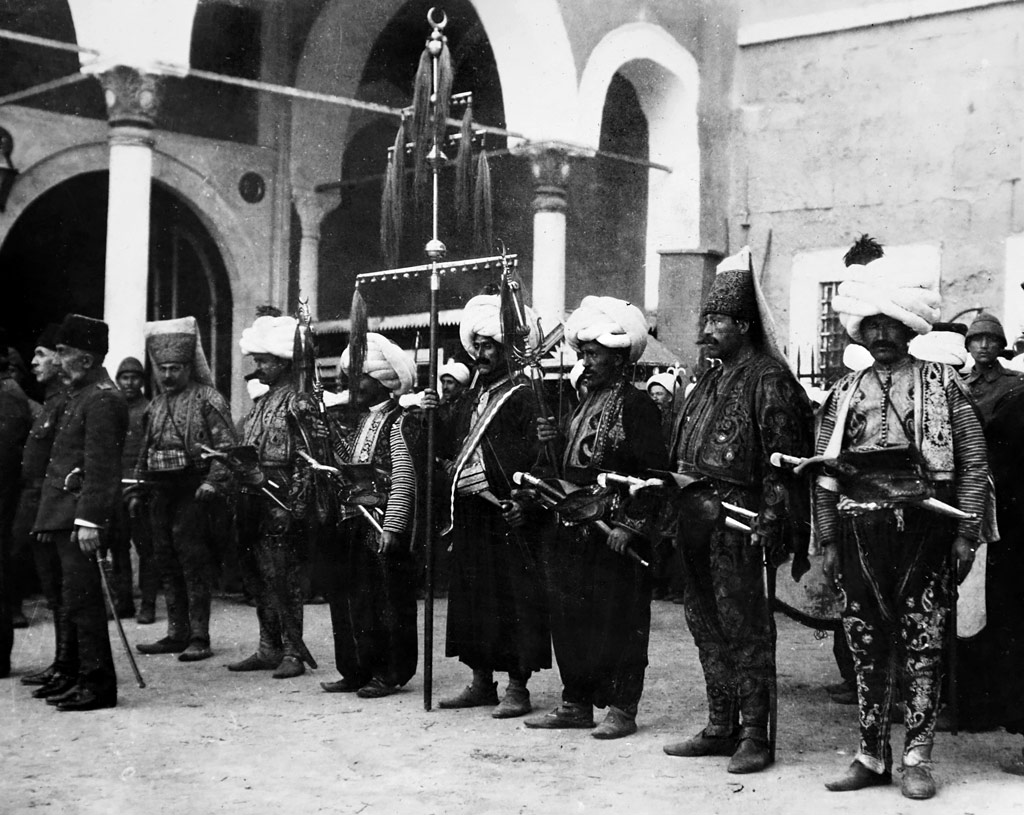
Mehterhâne, photo from 1917

Ottoman military bands were the first-recorded military marching bands. Though often known as the mehter, (Note: From Persian مهتر mehtar; meaning 'chief' or 'senior') this term refers only to a single musician in the band. In the Ottoman Empire, the band was generally known in the plural as mehterân, (Note: Persian: مهتران, romanized: mehtarân; meaning 'seniors' or 'elders') though those bands used in the retinue of a vizier or prince were generally known as mehterhâne. (Note: Persian: مهترخانه, romanized: mehtarxâne; meaning 'house of seniors') The band as a whole is often termed mehter bölüğü ('mehter company [troop]') or mehter takımı ('mehter platoon'). In Western Europe, the band's music is also often called Janissary music because the janissaries formed the core of the bands.

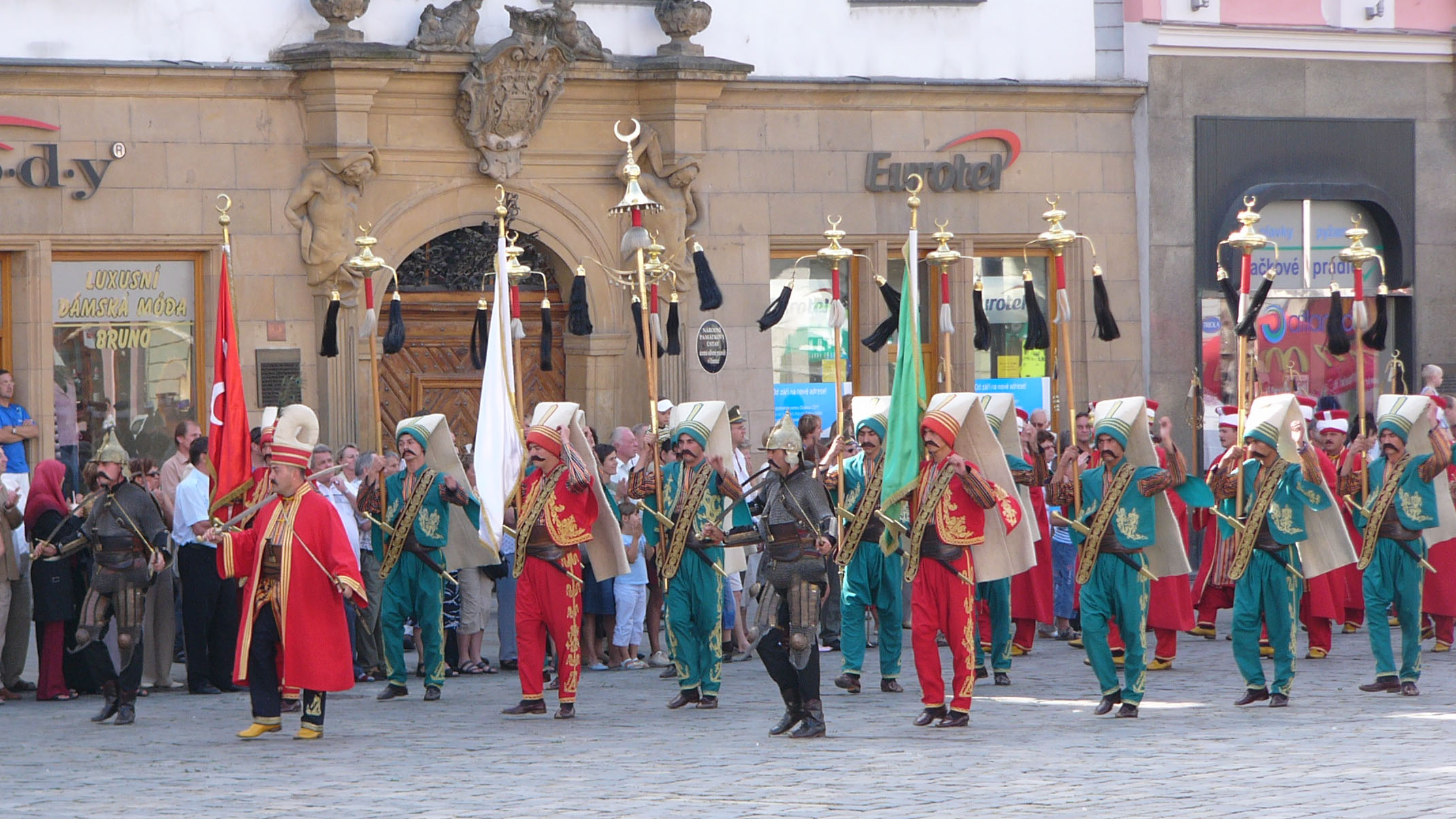
Modern mehter troop

== History ==
Ottoman mehterân

Such military bands as the mehters, were not definitively mentioned until the 13th century. It is believed that the first "mehter" was sent to Osman I by the Seljuk Sultan Alaeddin Kayqubad III as a present along with a letter that salutes the newly formed state. From then on every day after the afternoon prayer; "mehter" played for the Ottoman ruler. The notion of a military marching band, such as those in use even today, began to be borrowed from the Ottoman Empire in the 16th century. The sound associated with the mehterân also exercised an influence on European classical music, with composers such as Joseph Haydn, Wolfgang Amadeus Mozart, and Ludwig van Beethoven all writing compositions inspired by or designed to imitate the music of the mehters. (Note: Consider, for example, Beethoven's Turkish March, and the martial section of Ode to Joy in his Ninth Symphony)

In 1826, the music of the mehters fell into disfavor following Sultan Mahmud II's abolition of the Janissary Corps, who had formed the core of the bands. Subsequent to this, in the mid and late 19th century, the genre went into decline along with the Ottoman Empire. In 1911, as the empire was beginning to collapse, the director of Istanbul's military museum attempted a somewhat successful revival of the tradition, and by 1953—so as to celebrate the 500-year anniversary of the Fall of Constantinople to the forces of Sultan Mehmed II—the tradition had been fully restored as a band of the Turkish Armed Forces.

Today, the music of the mehters is largely ceremonial and considered by many Turks as a stirring example of heroism and a reminder of Turkey's historical past. Though the majority of the pieces performed by them are newer compositions.

Today, the Armed Forces Mehter Unit (Mehter Bölüğü) is the traditional band of the Turkish Armed Forces and it performs regularly at the Military Museum (Askeri Müze) in Istanbul as well as during certain state ceremonies. There is also the Ministry of Culture Istanbul Historical Music Ensemble.

== Mehteran ==
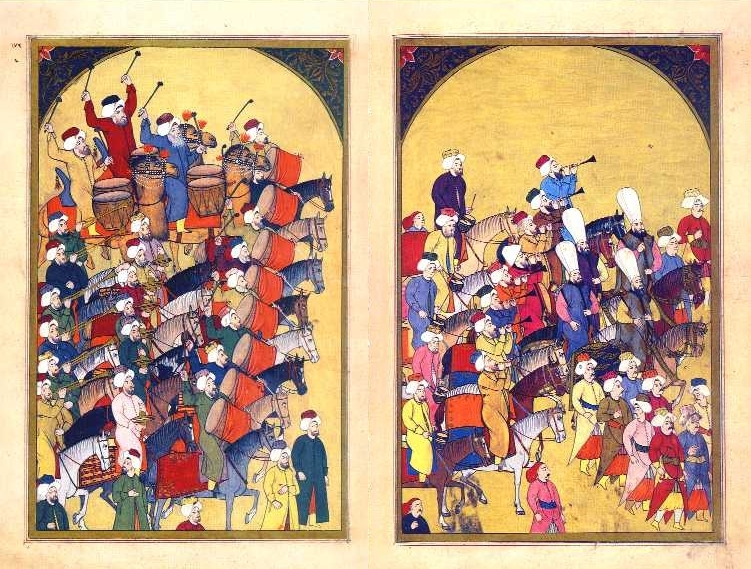
Mehterhâne, miniature from 1720

Mehter, literally "pre-eminences" in Ottoman, was the type of military ensemble within the Ottoman army which played martial tunes during military campaigns. The mehteran was usually associated with the Janissary corps of the Army, usually composed of Christian converts to Islam. The music of mehteran is called "mehter marşı" or "mehter march". "Mehterhane" is the name that was used for the group of players before the acceptance of the military band tradition by the Ottomans.

Mehter as Ottoman military music arose in the era of Osman Ghazi and had been played in the wars and in ceremonies customarily organized for various everyday purposes. There is not, however, any definite information about this organization until the era of Fatih Sultan Mehmed. With Fatih, while the establishment of the empire was developing, a radical improvement began, as well, in the organization of the mehter ensembles within the Ottoman Army.

=== Origins and early years of the bands ===
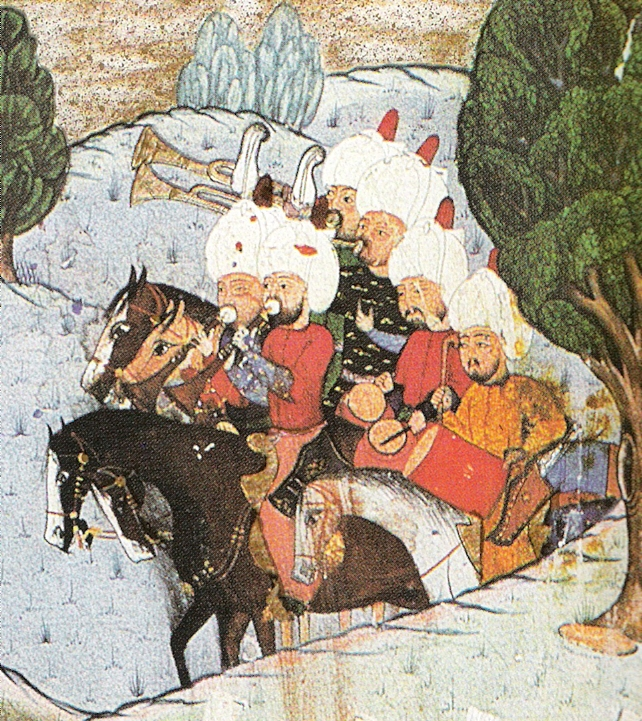
Mehterhâne, Ottoman miniature circa 1568. The musicians play two zurna, two spiral trumpets (boru), a cylinder drum davul and a pair of kettle drums (nakkare). In 1529, the "Turkish field clamor" reached Vienna for the first time.

Mehter tunes are found as far back as the 16th century. Nevertheless, it is known that Abdülkadir Meragi, the great Turkish music master, came to the Ottoman lands during the era of Yıldırım Bayezid Khan and composed some mehter melodies for the Ottoman classical army. In that period, Nefiri Behram Ağa and Emir-i Hac also wrote some mehter tunes. Mehter bands played some compositions of Hasan Can and Gazi Giray Han of Kırım, as well. There was great development of Turkish music in the 17th century. In the meantime, mehter conductors and bandmasters such as Zurnazenbaşı (head of the zurna players) İbrahim Ağa, Zurnazen Daği, Ahmed Çelebi from Edirne, Mehter Ahmed from Edirne also composed marches and traditional music for the methers, inclusive of arrangements of folk music from the regions the bandsmen came.

Evliya Çelebi provided important data about the mehterhane and mehter musicians in the middle of the 17th century. "There are 300 artists in mehterhane-i Hümayun (the mehterhane of the palace) in Istanbul. These are quite precious and well paid people. There is additionally a mehter takımı of 40 people in Yedikule since there is a citadel. They are on duty three times a day, in other words they give three concerts, so that public listens to Turkish military music. This is a law of Fatih. Moreover, there are 1,000 mehter artists in addition to them in Istanbul. Their bands are in Eyüp S, Kasımpaşa (Kaptan-ı Deryalık, the center of [the] Turkish Naval Forces), Galata, Tophane, Rumelihisarı, Beykoz, Anadoluhisarı, Üsküdar and Kız Kulesi." These mehter bands and their musicians, he said, are on duty (i.e. give concerts) twice a day, with people listening to them in the daybreak and in sunset.

Mehterhane preserved its existence, changing continuously, until the Janissary corps was abolished in the 1820s. According to its final form, each one was composed of nine davuls, nine zurnas, nine nakkares, nine cymbals and nine horns/trumpets, plus the timpanist/s using one or two Kos timpani, and a bandmaster. This band was called Dokuz katlı mehterhane (mehterhane composed of instruments, each instrument's number is nine). Mehter had many improvements in its music and performance parallel to its organization and establishment. Furthermore, renovations in the areas of art and culture influenced the music also. The studies and compositions of the music teachers of the palace in the 17th century such as Hanende Recep Çelebi, Zurnazenbaşı İbrahim Ağa, Eyyubi Mehmet Çelebi, Solakzade Mehmed Hendemi (who was also a very famous historian) and Selim III, the sultan and one of the great music masters of the 18th century, had influence on the renovation of the mehter bandsmen and the growth of the repertoire.

=== Western European interlude ===
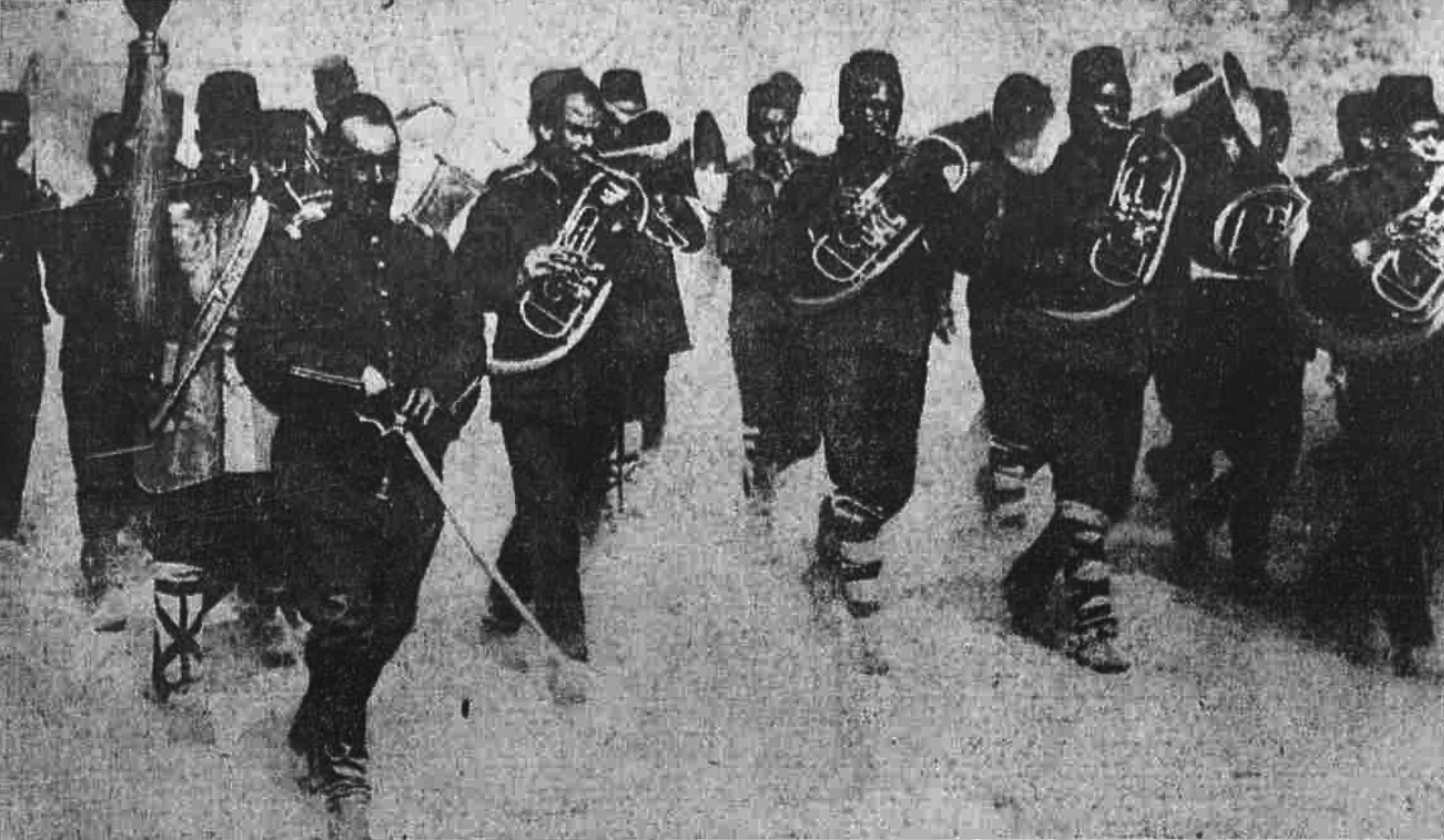
Western European style Ottoman military band

This well known and traditional organization was annulled while the radical and western European types of reforms took place in the Ottoman Empire in the era of Mahmud II (1808–1839). As Western European-style music shows became more commonplace with the impact of the reformist efforts of the palace and its environment, Mahmud II left the mehter aside and wanted a military band to be established in accordance with the Western European practice. The Muzıka-i Humayun (Royal Band in Ottoman Turkish, the military band of the palace) began officially to function in 1831 as the official state band of the Ottoman armed forces and this was the beginning of an obscure period in the history of the mehter traditions, which goes back at least 500 years. It would eventually evolve to become the modern day Harmonic Band of the Turkish Armed Forces, the seniormost and oldest of its kind.

=== Instrumentation ===
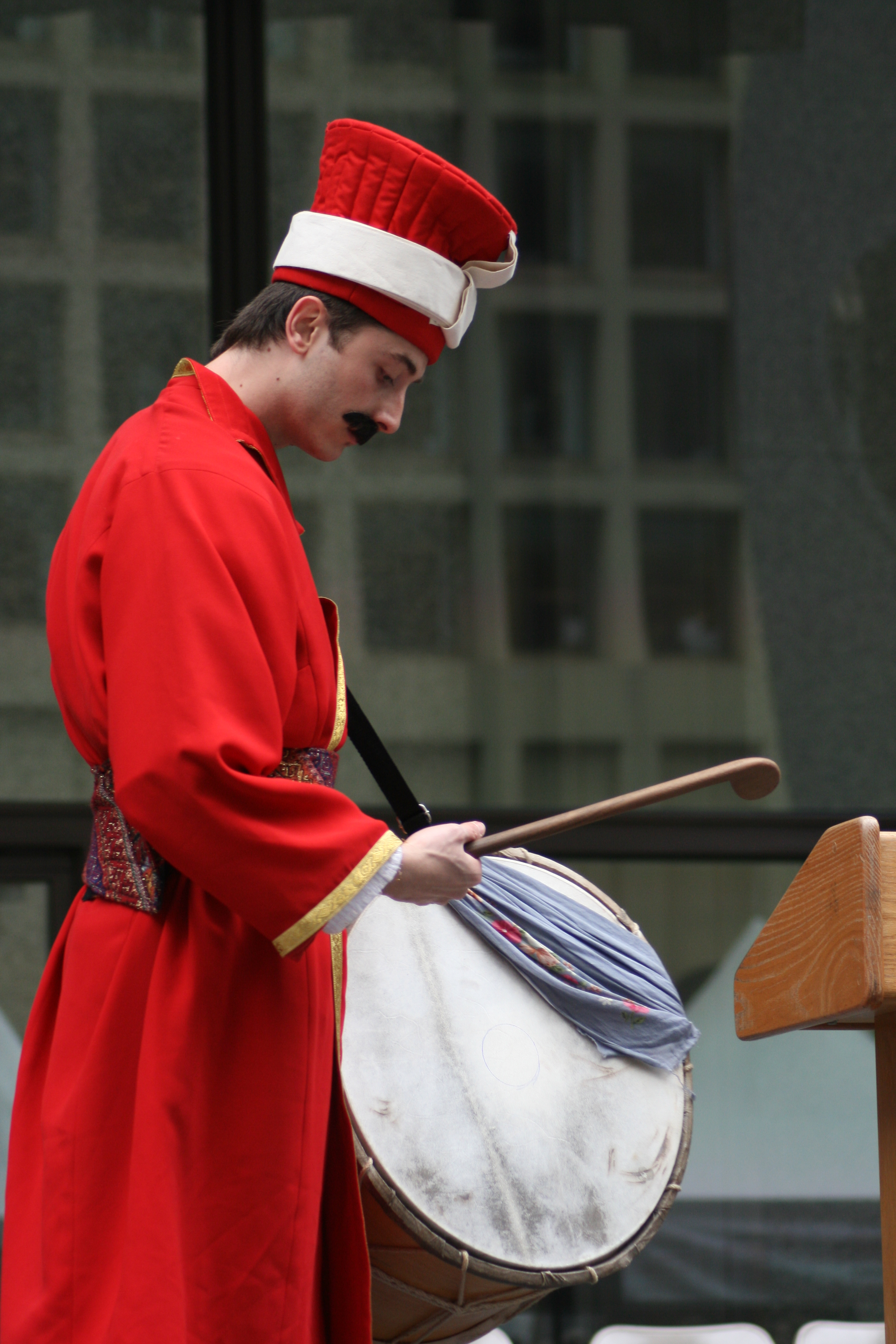
Davul and davul player

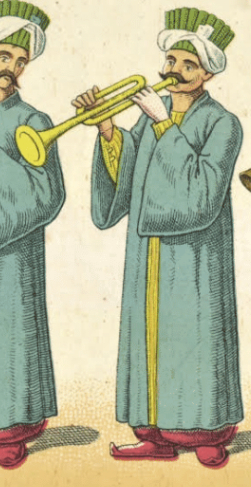
Boru, trumpet related to clarion and nafir

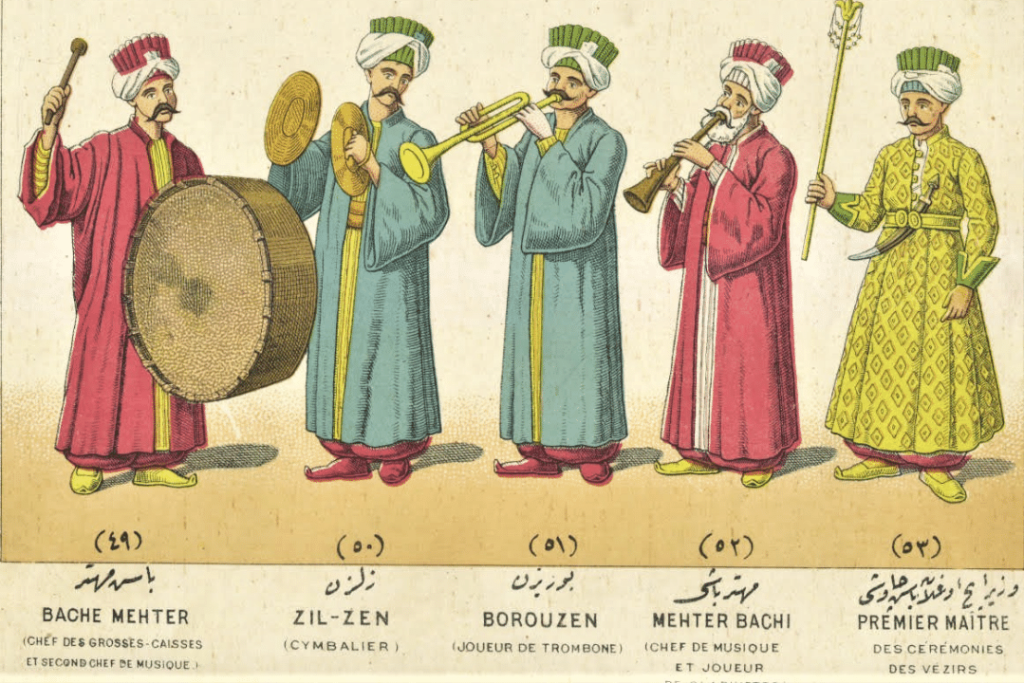
Mehter, Turkish military band, 1907. From left: davul, Halile (clash cymbals in Turkish), boru (Trumpet particular to Ottoman Turkey, zurna, Turkish crescent.

The standard instruments employed by a mehterân ensemble are the kös (a giant timpani), the nakare (a small kettledrum), the davul (a bass drum), the zil (cymbals), the kaba zurna (a bass variety of the zurna), the boru (a kind of trumpet), and the cevgen (a kind of stick bearing small concealed bells). They also played the daf (frame drum) and clarinets.

Documents from ancient times to the present indicate that yurağ (zurna), sıbızgı (sipsili nefir, the horn), the horn of Hun (şahnay), burguv (the horn), kuğruv (kös), tümrük (davul) and ve çeng (the cymbals) were the instruments in the tuğ band of the Turks in central Asia.

There were two types of zurna used by the Ottoman bandsmen. One of them was called the kabazurna having a low tone was played in the mehterhanes of the Ottomans and Kırım. 100 instrumentalists had played the kabazurna in the 17th century in Istanbul. The other, called the curazurna, small in size and high-pitched, was accompanied by the davul or the çifte na'ra. Evliya Çelebi wrote "There are boathouses belonging to the sovereigns. If the sultan wants to go to the new-palace or somewhere else, he travels at the back of a light galley under the precious dome on the jewel throne by watching the waterside houses, vineyards and orchards and shipyards on the side of Haliç with the accompaniment of only the curazurna and the çifte na'ra performing", while he was talking about the garden of the shipyard in Istanbul. The curazurna as the small zurna was planned to be added to the military mehter unit, which was intended to be established by Enver Paşa in 1917. Kabazurnas were made in Istanbul in the 16th century.

The musical instruments played in the mehterhane of the Ottomans could be classified as follows:

==== Wind instruments ====
===== Woodwinds =====
Kabazurna, Cura zurna, the Mehter pipe, clarinets

===== Brass =====
Horns (kurrenay), Boru and other trumpets (nafir) (Western natural trumpets or clarions would later be imported)

==== Percussion instruments ====
===== Drumline =====
The Kös (large timpani used by some bands), the Davul (bass drum), the Nakkare (small timpani), the Tabılbaz (medium timpani used by most bands), the Def (frame drum)

===== The Cymbals and the rattles =====
The Cymbals (clash cymbals) and the Çoğan (cevgen, Turkish crescents)

=== Organization ===
The Mehter bands were divided structurally into sections having a commander called bölükbaşı. The number of these sections was equal to the number of the kinds of the musical instrument:

- section of the zurna players/clarinettists
- of the hornists/trumpeters
- of the nakkare drummers
- of the cymbalists
- of the davul and frame drummers
- of the çoğan players (also formed the choir portion of the band)
- of the Kös timpanist/s

Zurnazenler Bölüğü (the section of the zurna players) had a section leader called the zurnazen who was also called the mehterbaşı (leader of the mehter), wearing red robes and a red cap, who served as conductor of the band. Other members of the section were called zurnacı or zurnazen whose rank was that of a soldier. Zurnazens were dressed in a purple quilted cap wrapped with a white destar on their head, a white robe, a sash around the waist, a red shalwar, yellow Yemeni (light, flat heeled shoes) and a red biniş (cübbe).

The zurna is the most fundamental music instrument of the mehter band. It can play all the melodies in solo. Its sound is colorful, lively, pastoral, imposing, emotional and frisky. Sliding sounds as well as short and sharp sounds can be obtained. Many masters of this musical instrument, which is the most convenient instrument for virtuoso playing among Turkish instruments, such as zurnazenbaşı İbrahim Ağa and Daği Ahmed Çelebi from Edirne, whose names are still very well known, come to mind. Moreover, there were great zurna masters among the Ottoman pashas such as zurnazen Mustafa Paşa.

The same organization and uniforms are also seen in the other sections.

== Structure ==
The different varieties of bands are classed according to the number of instruments and musicians employed: either six-layered (altı katlı), seven-layered (yedi katlı), or nine-layered (dokuz katlı).

In the early 19th century the Vizier's personal band included nine each of drums and fifes and flutes, seven trumpets and four cymbals (plus the optional timpanist).

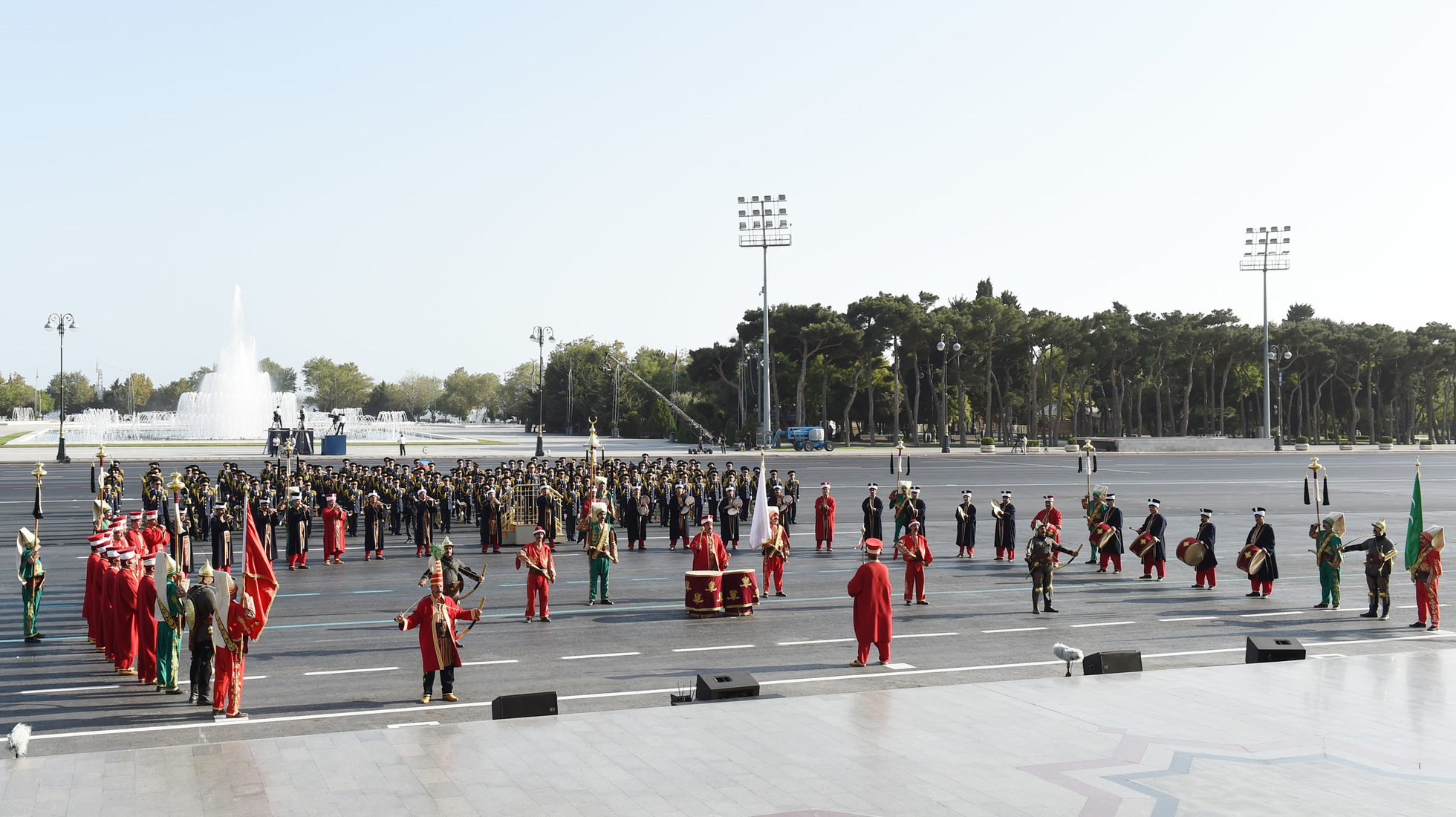
The Ottoman military band performing with the massed bands of the Military Band Service of the Armed Forces of Azerbaijan during a parade in honor of the 100th anniversary of Battle of Baku

The costumes worn by the mehterân, despite wide variance in color and style, are always very colourful, often including high ribbed hats which are flared at the top and long robes wrapped in colourful silks. The band director, conductor and section leaders all wear red robes. A colour guard wearing period uniforms and carrying weapons and flags of the era is present.

=== Members ===
Ceremonial members:

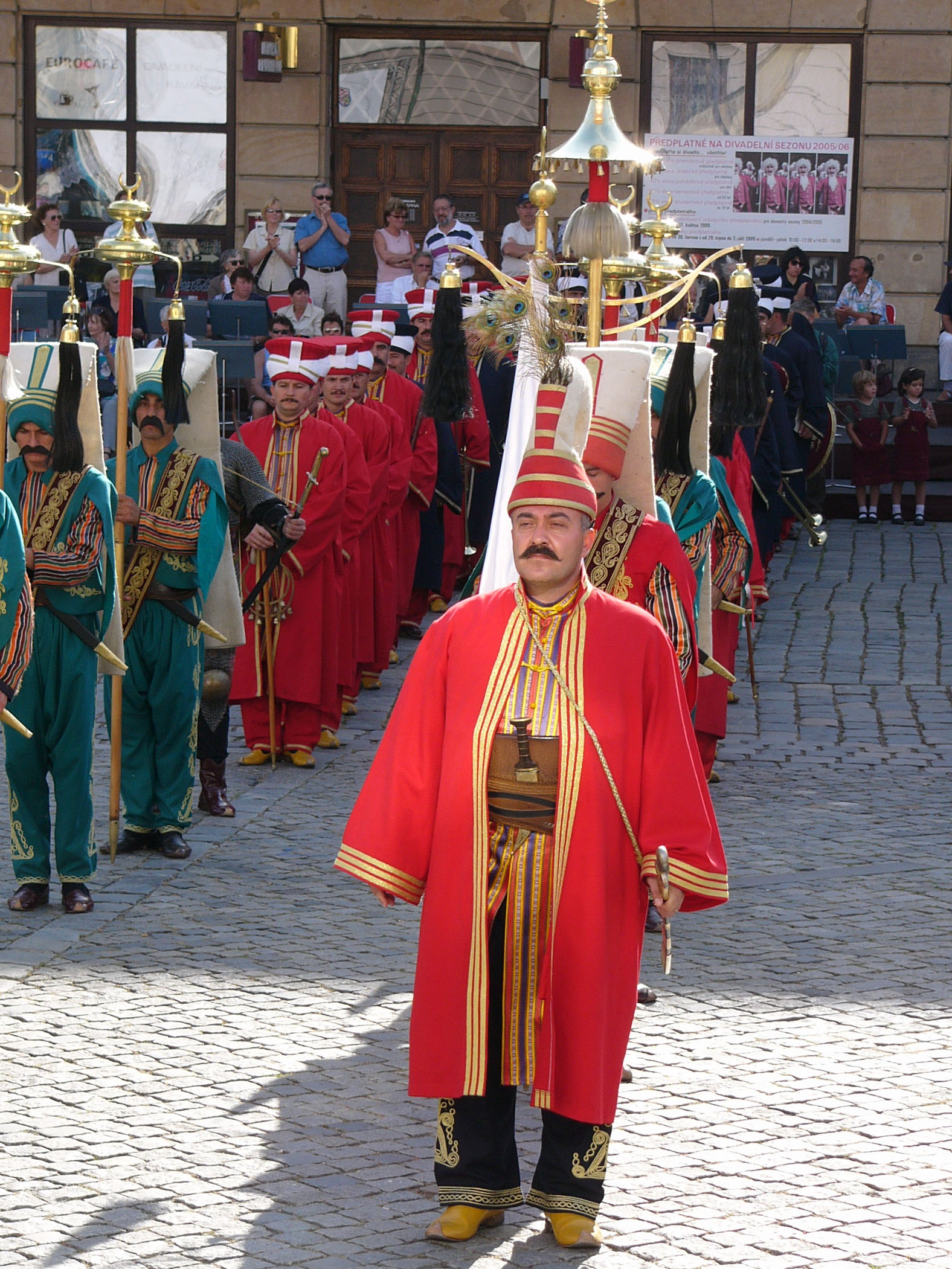
The çorbacıbaşı, leader of the mehter takımı, with horsetail as a sign of rank

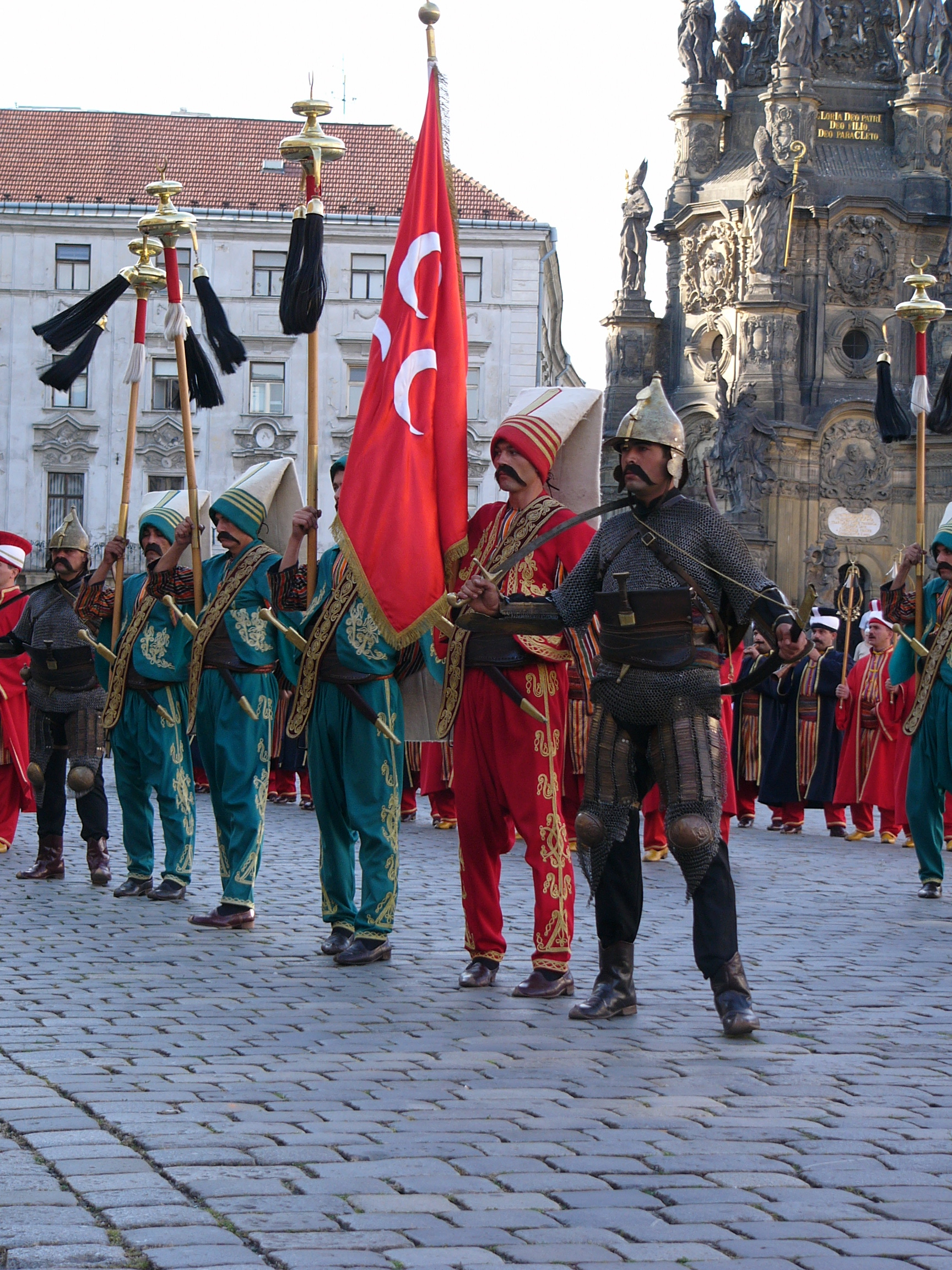
Flag and standard bearers

Percussion instruments:

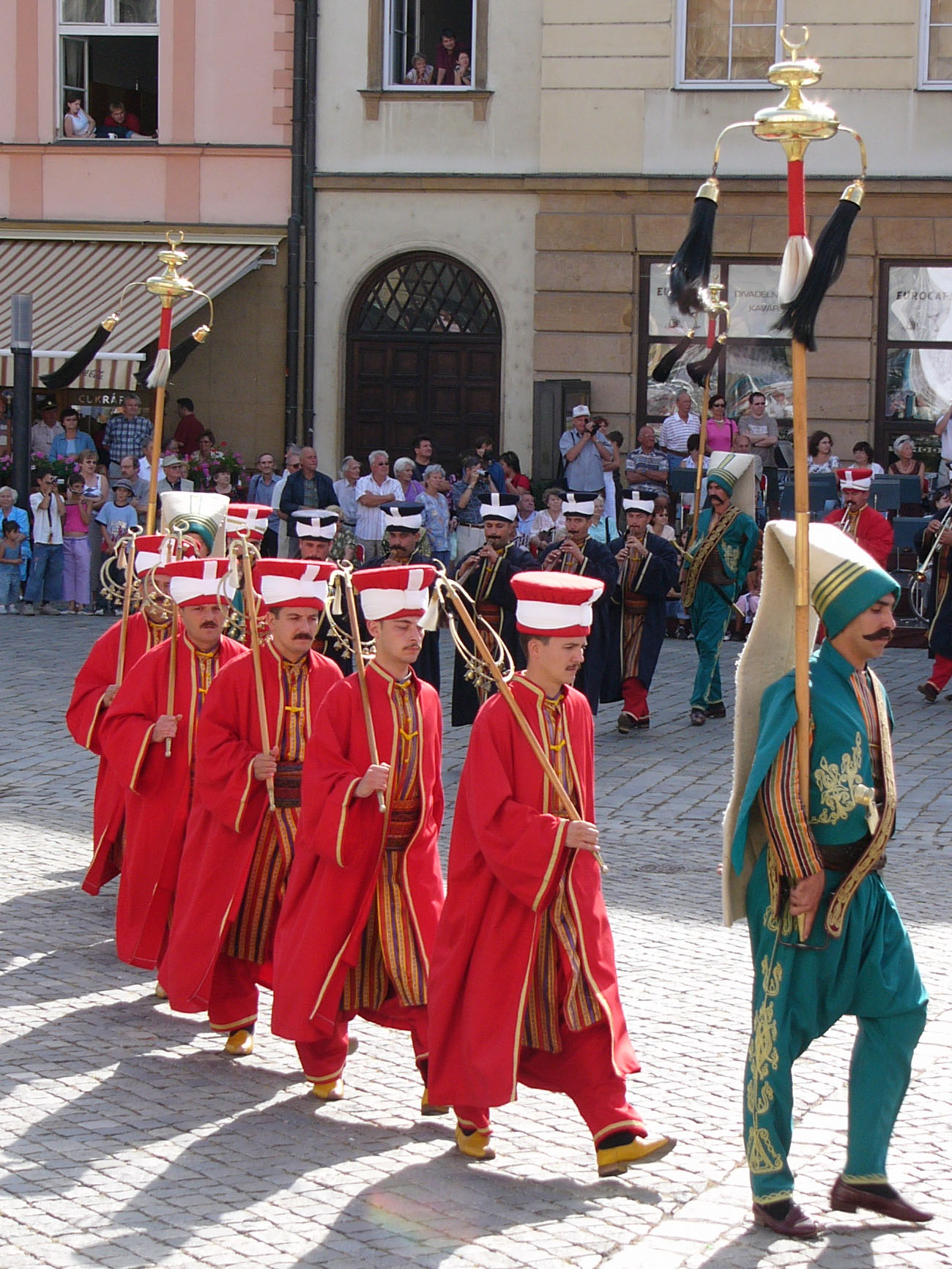
The çevgan player

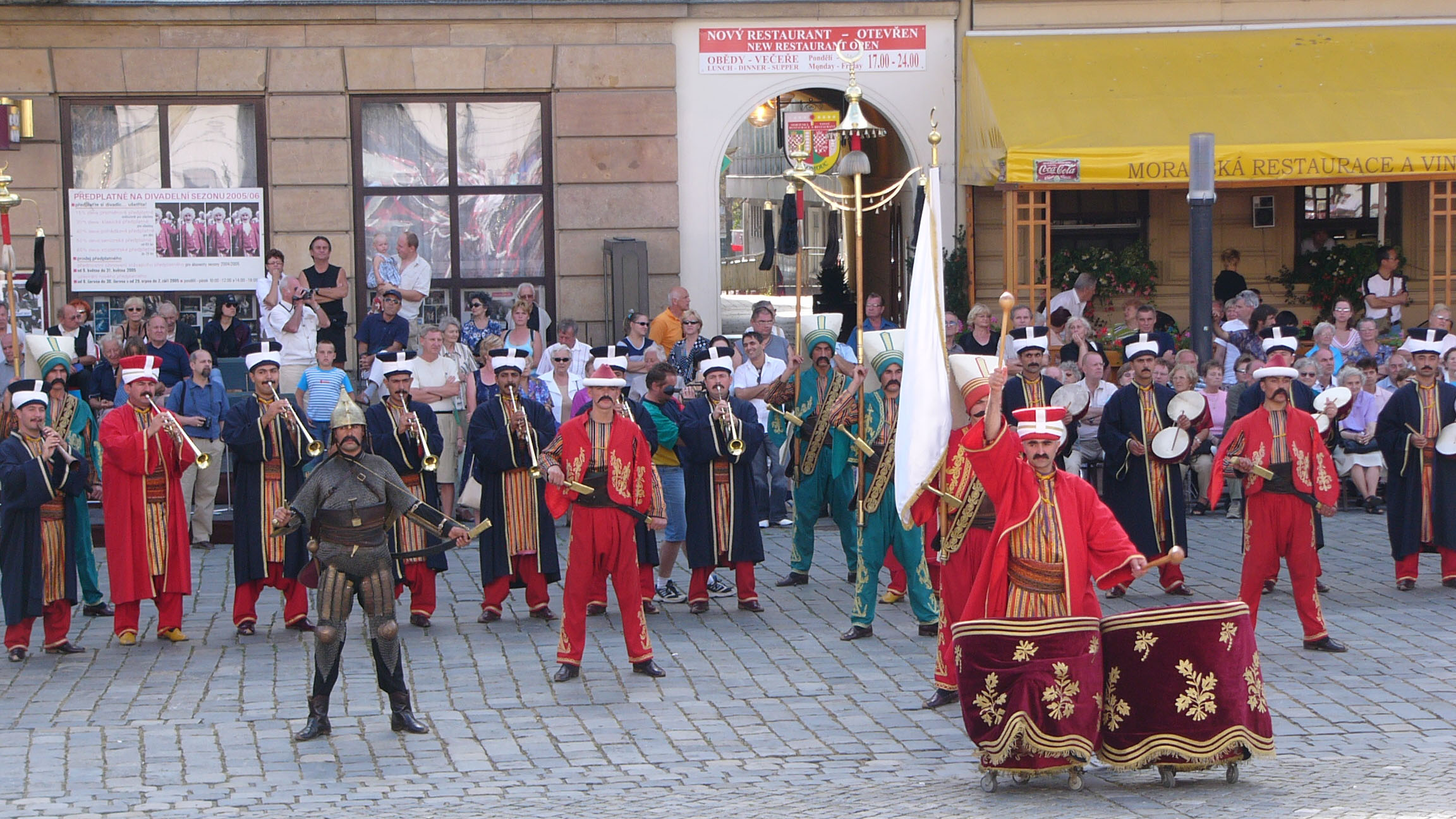
The kös player

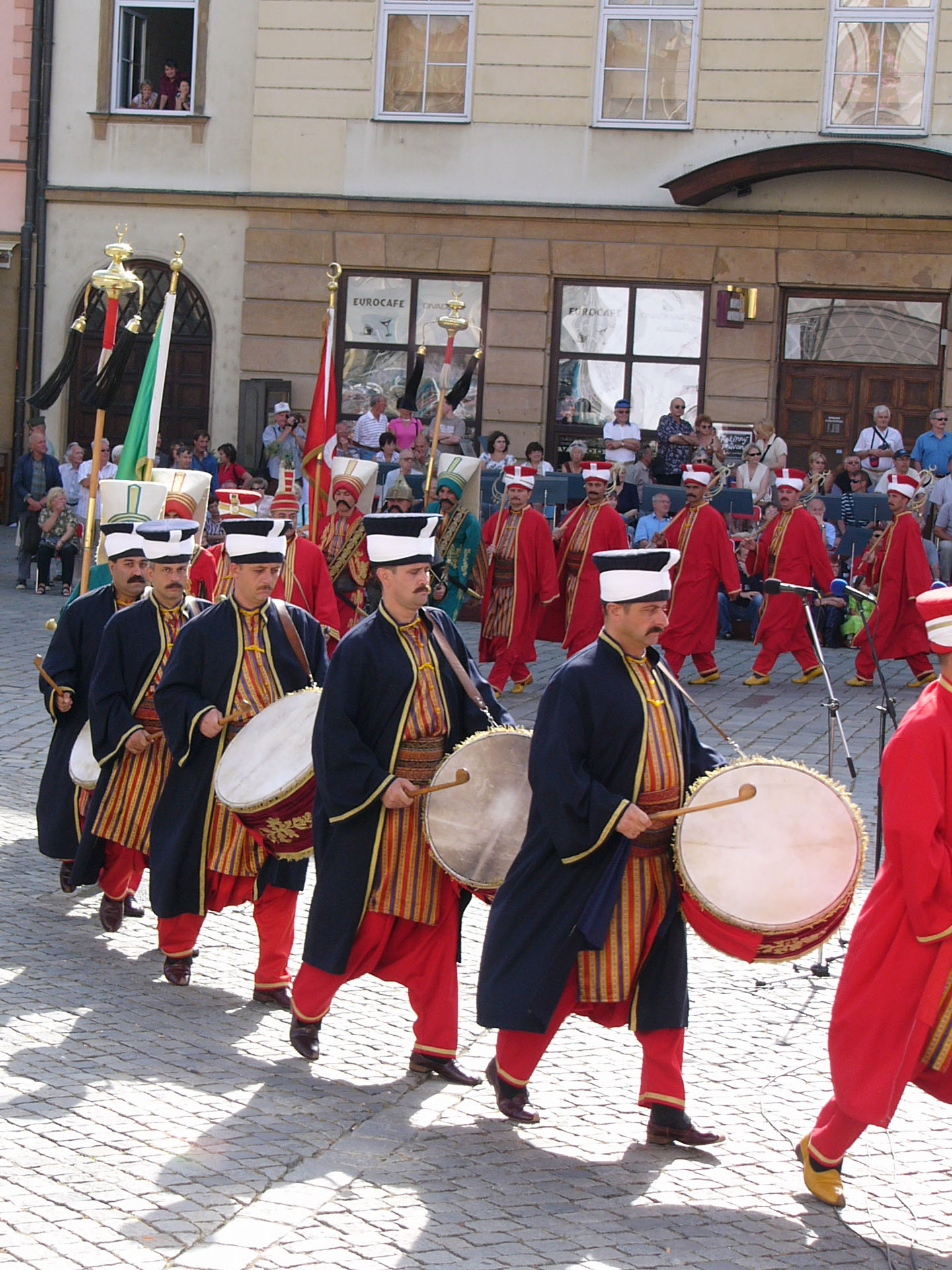
Davul players

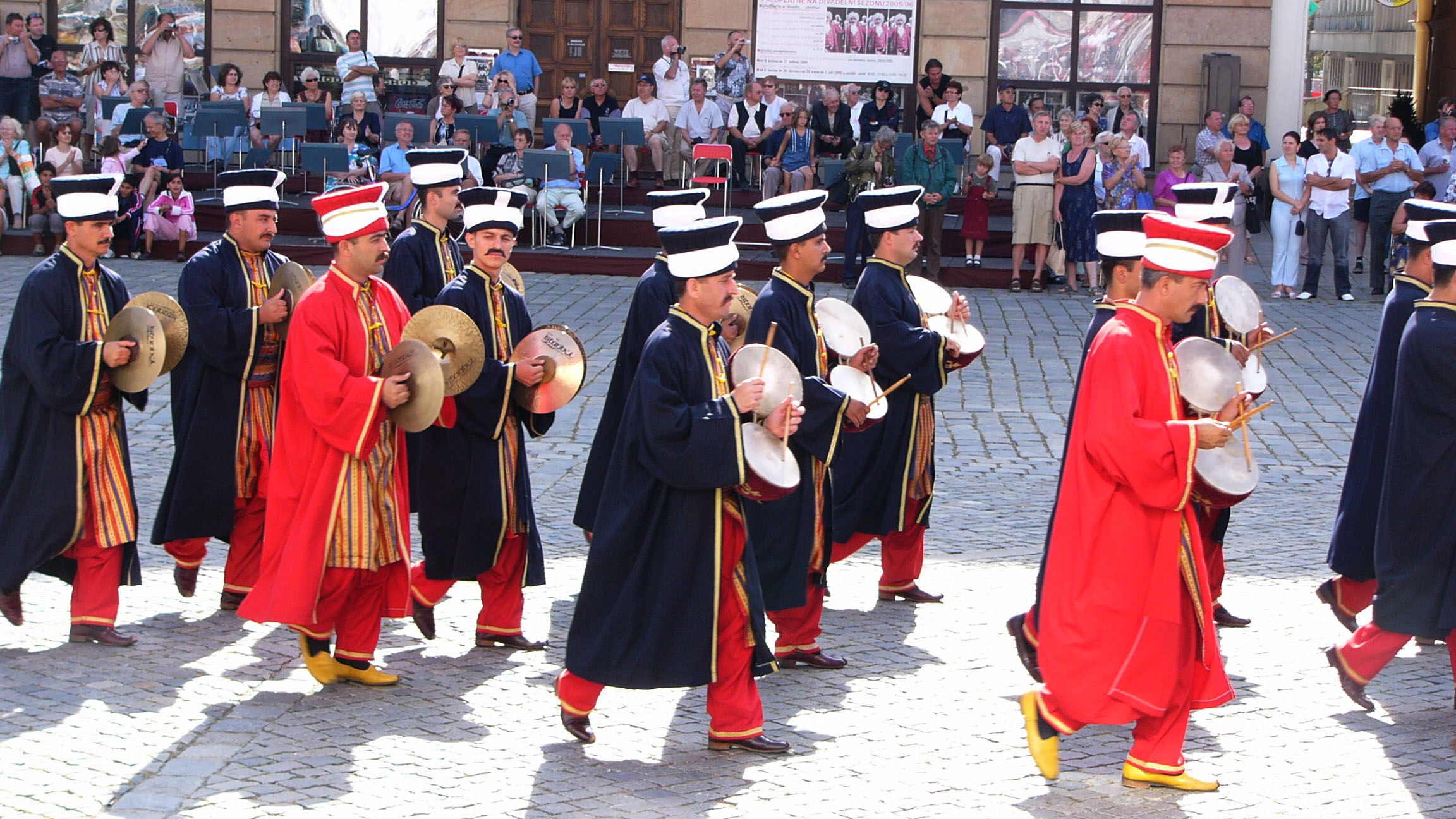
Zil and nakkare players

Wind instruments:

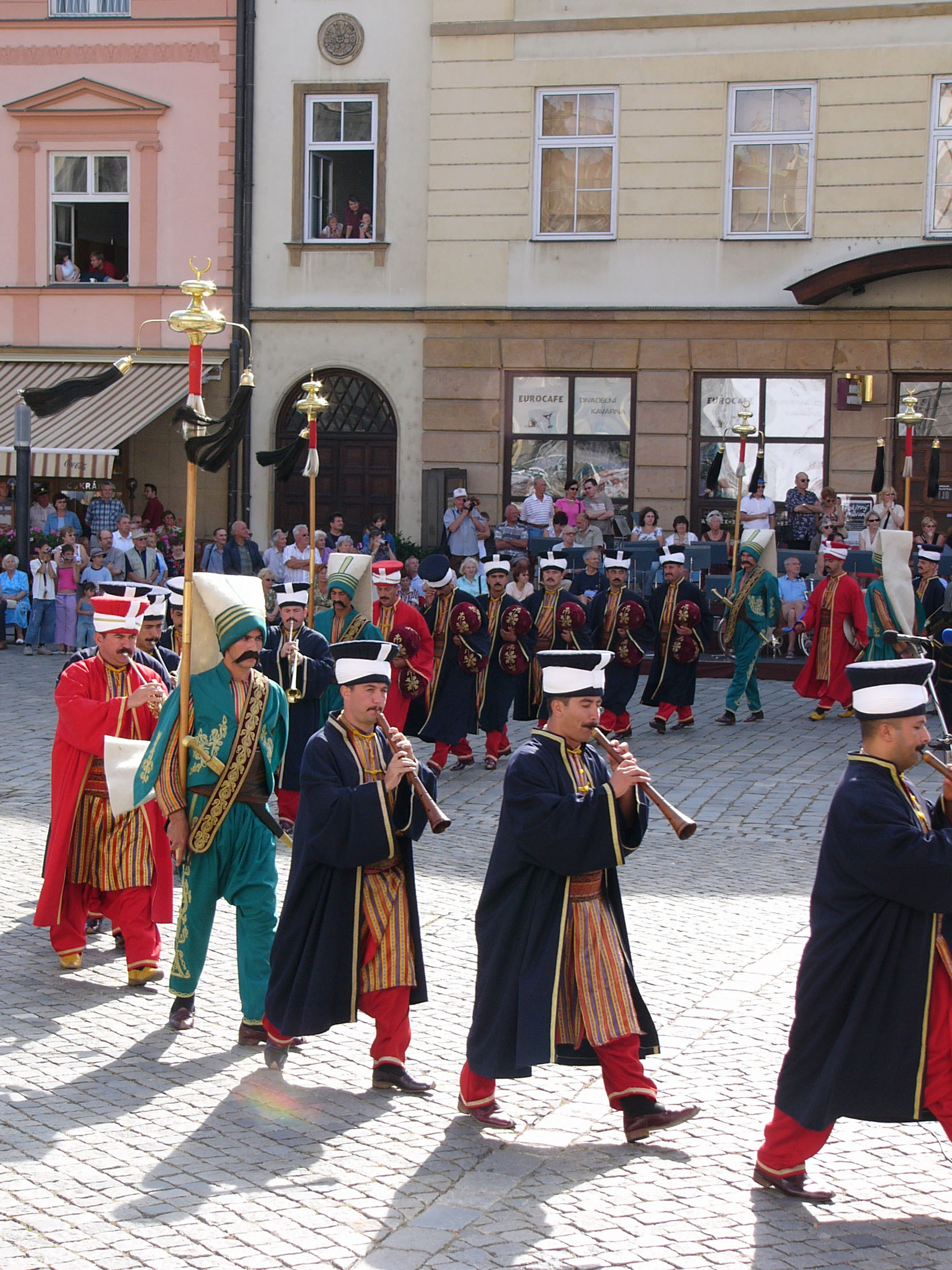
Kaba zurna players

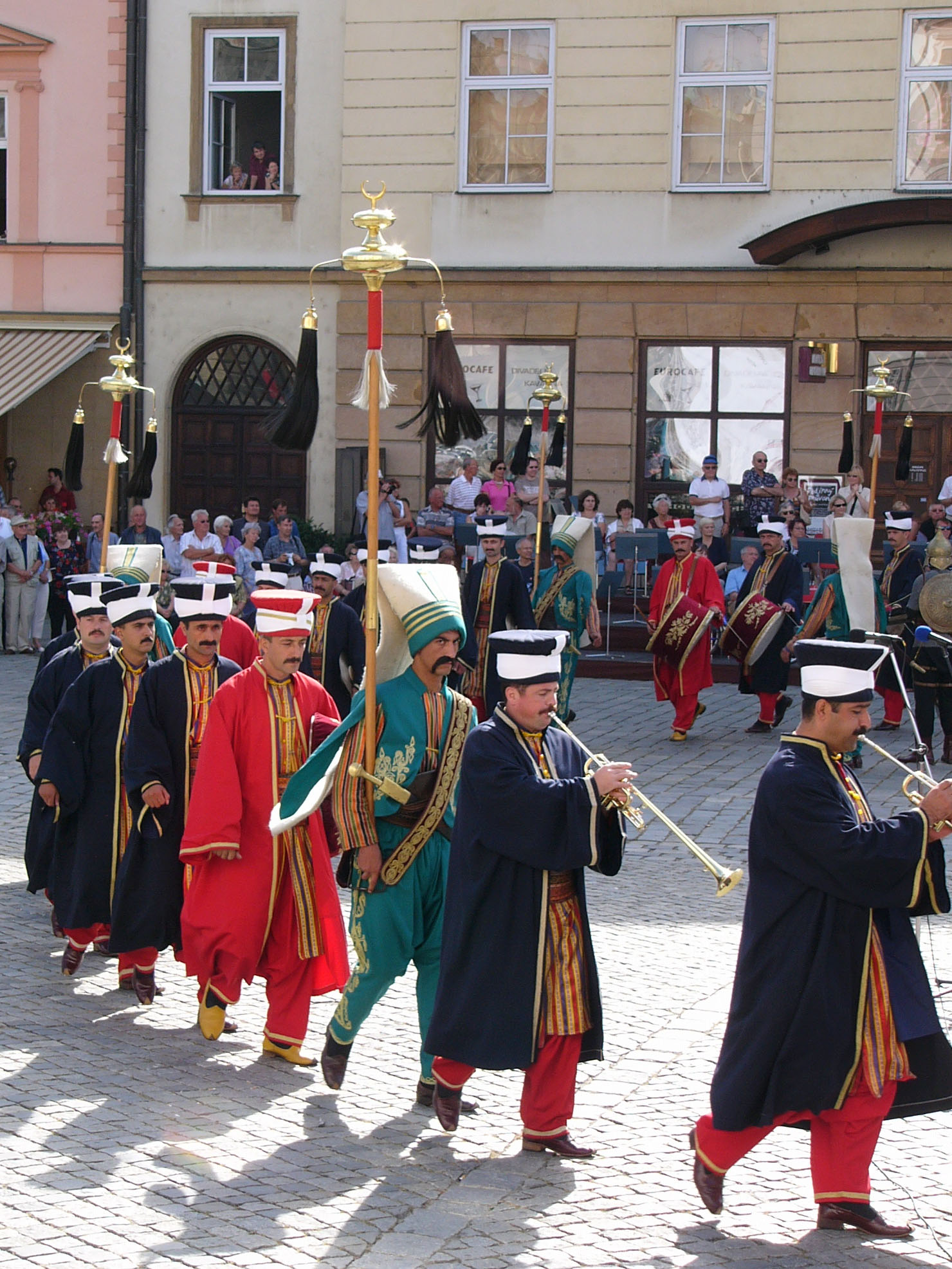
Boru (Western Fanfare Trumpet) players

== Style ==
Mehteran band playing at International Defence Industry Exhibition in Kielce as a part of Turkish national exposition

The sound of the Ottoman military band is characterized by an often shrill sound combining bass drums, horns (boru), bells, the triangle and cymbals (zil), among others. It is still played at state, military and tourist functions in modern Turkey by the Mehter Band and the troops that accompany it.

Mehterân usually play classical Ottoman music such as peşrev, semai, nakış, cengiharbi, murabba and kalenderi.

The oldest extant marches were written by Nefiri Behram, Emir-i Hac, Hasan Can and Gazi Giray II in the 16th century. Very few of these pieces are played today in Mehter groups.

=== Composers ===
16th century

- Nefiri Behram
- Emir-i Hac
- Hasan Can
- Gazi Giray II

17th century

- Zurnazen Edirneli Daği Ahmed Çelebi
- Zurnazenbaşı İbrahim Ağa
- Müstakim Ağa
- Hammali

18th century

- Hızır Ağa

== Mehter today ==
The Ottoman Military Band, Mehter, still plays on special occasions in Turkey as the Mehter Troop, which is part of the Turkish Armed Forces. The band also plays every day during summer months in Harbiye Istanbul; during winter months, it performs at indoor concerts. Its largest event takes place on May 29 of each year, which celebrates the conquest of Constantinople on May 29, 1453.

Local ensembles play in holiday concerts and even in community celebrations all over Turkey.

The Mehter Troop also performs as invited guests to events all over the globe as ambassadors of Turkish musical traditions. For example, the Troop played "Jeeway Jeeway (Long Live) Pakistan" during the Pakistan Day Parade of 2017. The band also appeared in the 1992 Royal Edinburgh Military Tattoo.

== See also ==
- Imperial anthems of the Ottoman Empire
- Music of Turkey
- Sipahi

== Notes and references ==
Notes
