= Kapnochori =

Kapnochori Καπνοχώρι
- Community
- Location within Greece
- Coordinates: 40°21.5′N 21°58.55′E
- Country: Greece
- Administrative region: Western Macedonia
- Regional unit: Kozani
- Municipality: Kozani
- Municipal unit: Ellispontos
- Elevation: 686 m (2,251 ft)

Population (2021)
  - Community: 251
- Time zone: UTC+2 (EET)
  - Summer (DST): UTC+3 (EEST)
- Postal code: 501 50
- Area code: +30-2461
- Vehicle registration: ΚΖ

Kapnochori (Greek: Καπνοχώρι, "tobacco village") is a village and a community of the Kozani municipality. Before the 2011 local government reform it was part of the municipality of Ellispontos, of which it was a municipal district. The 2021 census recorded 251 inhabitants in the community.

== Administrative division ==
The community of Kapnochori consists of three separate settlements:

- Anatoliko (population 27 in 2021)
- Kapnochori (population 221)
- Skafi (population 3)
