= Anatoliko, Kozani =

Anatoliko Ανατολικό
- Settlement
- Location within Greece
- Coordinates: 40°21.74′N 21°59.15′E
- Country: Greece
- Administrative region: West Macedonia
- Regional unit: Kozani
- Municipality: Kozani
- Municipal unit: Ellispontos
- Community: Kapnochori
- Elevation: 690 m (2,260 ft)

Population (2021)
  - Total: 27
- Time zone: UTC+2 (EET)
  - Summer (DST): UTC+3 (EEST)
- Postal code: 501 50
- Area code: 02461
- Vehicle registration: ΚΖ

Anatoliko (Greek: Ανατολικό) is a village in the Kozani municipality. Before the 2011 local government reform, it was part of the municipality of Ellispontos. Administratively Anatoliko is a part of the community of Kapnochori. The 2021 census recorded 27 inhabitants in the village.
