= Vermio, Kozani =

Vermio Βέρμιο
- Municipal unit
- Location within the regional unit

- Location within Greece
- Coordinates: 40°35′N 21°46′E
- Country: Greece
- Administrative region: West Macedonia
- Regional unit: Kozani
- Municipality: Eordaia

Area
  - Municipal unit: 187.153 km^{2} (72.260 sq mi)

Population (2021)
  - Municipal unit: 2,328
  - Municipal unit density: 12.44/km^{2} (32.22/sq mi)
- Time zone: UTC+2 (EET)
  - Summer (DST): UTC+3 (EEST)
- Vehicle registration: KZ

Vermio (Greek: Βέρμιο) is a former municipality in the Kozani regional unit of West Macedonia, Greece. Since the 2011 local government reform, it is part of the municipality Eordaia, of which it is a municipal unit. The municipal unit has an area of 187.153 km^{2}. In 2021, it had a total population of 2,328 permanent inhabitants. The seat of the municipality was in Komnina.
